= Meanings of minor-planet names: 82001–83000 =

As minor planet discoveries are confirmed, they are given a permanent number by the IAU's Minor Planet Center (MPC), and the discoverers can then submit names for them, following the IAU's naming conventions. The list below concerns those minor planets in the specified number-range that have received names, and explains the meanings of those names.

Official naming citations of newly named small Solar System bodies are approved and published in a bulletin by IAU's Working Group for Small Bodies Nomenclature (WGSBN). Before May 2021, citations were published in MPC's Minor Planet Circulars for many decades. Recent citations can also be found on the JPL Small-Body Database (SBDB). Until his death in 2016, German astronomer Lutz D. Schmadel compiled these citations into the Dictionary of Minor Planet Names (DMP) and regularly updated the collection.

Based on Paul Herget's The Names of the Minor Planets, Schmadel also researched the unclear origin of numerous asteroids, most of which had been named prior to World War II. This article incorporates text from this source, which is in the public domain: SBDB New namings may only be added to this list below after official publication as the preannouncement of names is condemned. The WGSBN publishes a comprehensive guideline for the naming rules of non-cometary small Solar System bodies.

== 82001–82100 ==
Named minor planet	Provisional	This minor planet was named for...	Ref · Catalog
82071 Debrecen	2000 YA_{32}	Debrecen is the second largest city in Hungary and the regional center and capital of Hajdú-Bihar county. Kossuth University is located there. The Debrecen Heliophysical Observatory of the Hungarian Academy of Sciences evolved from the Kossuth educational observatory in 1958	JPL · 82071
82092 Kalocsa	2001 DV_{86}	Kalocsa, Hungary, birthplace of the second discoverer	JPL · 82092

== 82101–82200 ==
back to top

Named minor planet	Provisional	This minor planet was named for...	Ref · Catalog
82153 Alemigliorini	2001 FT_{169}	Alessandra Migliorini (born 1978), Italian researcher at the National Institute for Astrophysics (INAF) in Rome, has dedicated years of activity to search for Trojans of the giant planets on digital archives for the Astrovirtel survey, and to discover near-Earth objects. She is also studying the icy moons of Saturn, using data from the Cassini-Huygens instruments.	JPL · 82153

== 82201–82300 ==
back to top

Named minor planet	Provisional	This minor planet was named for...	Ref · Catalog
82232 Heuberger	2001 JU	Robert Heuberger (1922–2021) and his wife Ruth (1924–2016), Swiss entrepreneurs and friends of the discoverer Markus Griesser	JPL · 82232

== 82301–82400 ==
back to top

Named minor planet	Provisional	This minor planet was named for...	Ref · Catalog
82332 Las Vegas	2001 LV_{6}	Las Vegas, Nevada, in honor of its centennial (1905–2005)	JPL · 82332
82346 Hakos	2001 LD_{18}	Hakos is a farm and the location of the IAS Observatory (221) in Namibia, Africa. It is owned by the Internationale Amateur Observatory (German: Internationale Amateur Sternwarte, IAS), a non-profit society, facilitating access to large telescopes under optimal skies, both for visual observations and astrophotography (Src).	JPL · 82346
82361 Benitoloyola	2001 MV_{6}	Benito Loyola (born 1961) is a retired US Navy Captain Naval Aviator and graduate of the US Naval Academy, who developed award-winning 3-D modeling and simulation technologies. He is an amateur astronomer currently engaged in a NASA-Hampton University Jupiter-asteroid impact detection project.	IAU · 82361

== 82401–82500 ==
back to top

Named minor planet	Provisional	This minor planet was named for...	Ref · Catalog
82463 Mluigiaborsi	2001 OV_{16}	Maria Luigia Borsi (born 1973), an Italian opera singer. A lyric soprano, she has performed in major opera houses around the world and is known especially for interpreting operas by Puccini and Verdi.	JPL · 82463
82464 Jaroslavboček	2001 OE_{17}	Jaroslav Boček (born 1947) has worked on the Astronomical Institute of the Czech Academy of Sciences for several decades. He was involved in the European Network for photographing fireballs and his technical skills were crucial for running all-sky cameras on Czech stations of the network.	JPL · 82464

== 82501–82600 ==
back to top

Named minor planet	Provisional	This minor planet was named for...	Ref · Catalog
82559 Emilbřezina	2001 OD_{77}	Emil Březina (1975–2012) was a Czech amateur astronomer and a longtime associate at the Vsetín Observatory, to which he dedicated most of his time and energy. He was engaged in observing comets, meteors and extreme meteorological events. His other interests included photography, jazz music and mountain hiking.	JPL · 82559

== 82601–82700 ==
back to top

Named minor planet	Provisional	This minor planet was named for...	Ref · Catalog
82638 Bottariclaudio	2001 PF_{1}	Claudio Bottari (born 1960), a long-time Italian amateur astronomer since 1980 and was among the first to use CCDs in the Italian amateur community in 1991. At the Mira observatory he uses a 0.6-m concentric Schmidt-Cassegrain in search of supernovae and near-Earth objects. He discovered SN 1996ai in NGC 5005.	JPL · 82638
82656 Puskás	2001 PQ_{13}	Ferenc Puskás (1927–2006), Hungarian football player whose legendary left foot scored 349 goals for Budapesti Honvéd in 358 major-league football matches and 324 goals for Real Madrid. His 83 goals (in 84 matches) remain a record for any player in an international event, and he scored in Hungary's final loss to Germany during the 1954 World Cup.	JPL · 82656

== 82701–82800 ==
back to top

Named minor planet	Provisional	This minor planet was named for...	Ref · Catalog
There are no named minor planets in this number range

== 82801–82900 ==
back to top

Named minor planet	Provisional	This minor planet was named for...	Ref · Catalog
82896 Vaubaillon	2001 QV_{87}	Jeremie Vaubaillon (born 1976), a French astronomer working at IMCCE, Observatoire de Paris.	JPL · 82896

== 82901–83000 ==
back to top

Named minor planet	Provisional	This minor planet was named for...	Ref · Catalog
82926 Jacquey	2001 QH_{110}	Anne-Marie Jacquey, French treasurer of the Société astronomique de Montpellier and a member of the Observatoire des Pises minor planet observing team. She also played an active role in the establishment and development of the observatory.	JPL · 82926
82927 Ferrucci	2001 QK_{110}	Francesco Ferruccio (1489–1530) was the hero who, at the head of the Florentine army, fought and died for the independence of the republic of Florence in the Battle of Gavinana.	JPL · 82927
82937 Lesicki	2001 QW_{113}	Andrzej Lesicki (born 1950) is a cellular biologist working at Adam Mickiewicz University in Poznań, Poland. From his position as Rector of the university, he has actively supported asteroid research at the university's observatory and helped to develop a computer cluster that is used for modeling asteroids from their lightcurves.	JPL · 82937

back to top

Preceded by 81,001–82,000	Meanings of minor-planet names List of minor planets: 82,001–83,000	Succeeded by 83,001–84,000
