= Robert Heuberger =

Swiss screenwriter (1922–2021)

Robert K. Heuberger
- Born: 12 January 1922; Olten, Switzerland
- Died: 29 January 2021 (aged 99); Winterthur
- Occupations: Swiss real estate entrepreneur, patron and author
- Spouse: Ruth Heuberger

Robert K. Heuberger (12 January 1922 – 29 January 2021) was a Swiss real estate entrepreneur, patron of the arts and an author under the pseudonym Victor Vermont.

== Life and career ==
Heuberger grew up with three siblings in poor circumstances and lost his father when he was three years old. He completed his training at the Swiss Volksbank in Aarburg in the 1930s. When the Second World War began, he was forced to run the bank branch alone as an apprentice. As a bank and insurance buyer, he later worked for the Volksbank as an accountant, credit manager and securities specialist, then as an agency manager for the Bâloise insurance company.

In 1947 he was promoted to management secretary in Winterthur, where he also met his wife Ruth née Mötteli (* 1924, † 2016), Together with his wife Heuberger founded Siska Heuberger Holding AG in 1954, with which he implemented a series of major projects, especially in eastern Switzerland, with the construction of about 1000 apartments in Winterthur. According to the economic magazine's BILANZ, he had assets of approximately CHF300 to 500 million in 2012.

He was the father of the entrepreneurs Günter and Rainer Heuberger. Günter Heuberger was a media entrepreneur (Radio Top, Tele Top) and Rainer Heuberger was Zurich's former cantonal councilor (SVP) of Siska Verwaltungs AG. His youngest child was a daughter.

== Engagement ==
Heuberger's public commitments include funding for the establishment of the Club of Rome in Winterthur, setting up the non-profit «Robert and Ruth Heuberger Foundation» in 1987, as well as founding an innovation prize for young entrepreneurs. In 2007, the City of Winterthur awarded him the prize of the "Winterthur Lion". In 2013, Heuberger opposed the popular initiative to abolish conscription by means of double-page advertisements.

== Honors ==
The asteroid 82232 Heuberger, discovered by Markus Griesser at the Swiss Eschenberg Observatory in 2001, has been named in honor of Robert and Ruth Heuberger's commitment to social and cultural institutions. The official naming citation was published by the Minor Planet Center on 13 July 2004 (M.P.C. 52327).

== Artistic work ==
Heuberger, who was a screenwriter published the following works under the pseudonym «Victor Vermont»:

- Alltagstrilogie, Television play
- Das Geld liegt auf der Strasse, Theatre play
- Eine Frau bleibt eine Frau, Theatre play

== Book ==
- Robert Heuberger and Karl Lüönd: Nicht wie der Wind weht … Lebensbericht eines Unternehmers. NZZ Libro, Zürich 2013, ISBN 978-3-03823-834-8.
