= List of minor planets: 82001–83000 =

The following is a partial list of minor planets, running from minor-planet number 82001 through 83000, inclusive. The primary data for this and other partial lists is based on JPL's "Small-Body Orbital Elements" and data available from the Minor Planet Center. Critical list information is also provided by the MPC, unless otherwise specified from Lowell Observatory. A detailed description of the table's columns and additional sources are given on the main page including a complete list of every page in this series, and a statistical break-up on the dynamical classification of minor planets.

Also see the summary list of all named bodies in numerical and alphabetical order, and the corresponding naming citations for the number range of this particular list. New namings may only be added to this list after official publication, as the preannouncement of names is condemned by the Working Group for Small Bodies Nomenclature of the International Astronomical Union.

| Near-Earth obj. | MBA (inner) | MBA (outer) | Centaur |
| Mars-crosser | MBA (middle) | Jupiter trojan | Trans-Neptunian obj. |
| Unclassified |

== 82001–82100 ==
| Designation | | | Discovery | | | Properties | | Ref |
| Permanent | Provisional | Named after | Date | Site | Discoverer(s) | Category | Diam. | Ref |
|---|---|---|---|---|---|---|---|---|
| 82001 | 2000 QF_{219} | — | August 20, 2000 | Anderson Mesa | LONEOS | THM | 4.8 km | MPC · JPL |
| 82002 | 2000 QG_{219} | — | August 20, 2000 | Anderson Mesa | LONEOS | · | 4.2 km | MPC · JPL |
| 82003 | 2000 QU_{219} | — | August 20, 2000 | Anderson Mesa | LONEOS | · | 7.7 km | MPC · JPL |
| 82004 | 2000 QA_{226} | — | August 20, 2000 | Anderson Mesa | LONEOS | · | 7.5 km | MPC · JPL |
| 82005 | 2000 RA_{14} | — | September 1, 2000 | Socorro | LINEAR | TEL | 3.5 km | MPC · JPL |
| 82006 | 2000 RA_{18} | — | September 1, 2000 | Socorro | LINEAR | · | 8.4 km | MPC · JPL |
| 82007 | 2000 RU_{34} | — | September 1, 2000 | Socorro | LINEAR | · | 7.3 km | MPC · JPL |
| 82008 | 2000 RV_{35} | — | September 3, 2000 | Kitt Peak | Spacewatch | · | 6.7 km | MPC · JPL |
| 82009 | 2000 RF_{68} | — | September 2, 2000 | Socorro | LINEAR | · | 11 km | MPC · JPL |
| 82010 | 2000 RN_{68} | — | September 2, 2000 | Socorro | LINEAR | HYG | 6.3 km | MPC · JPL |
| 82011 | 2000 RW_{68} | — | September 2, 2000 | Socorro | LINEAR | 3:2 · SHU | 12 km | MPC · JPL |
| 82012 | 2000 RQ_{70} | — | September 2, 2000 | Socorro | LINEAR | · | 7.3 km | MPC · JPL |
| 82013 | 2000 RA_{88} | — | September 2, 2000 | Haleakala | NEAT | · | 4.6 km | MPC · JPL |
| 82014 | 2000 RL_{94} | — | September 4, 2000 | Anderson Mesa | LONEOS | · | 5.1 km | MPC · JPL |
| 82015 | 2000 RK_{95} | — | September 4, 2000 | Anderson Mesa | LONEOS | · | 7.6 km | MPC · JPL |
| 82016 | 2000 RJ_{101} | — | September 5, 2000 | Anderson Mesa | LONEOS | (895) | 11 km | MPC · JPL |
| 82017 | 2000 SX_{6} | — | September 22, 2000 | Socorro | LINEAR | · | 7.3 km | MPC · JPL |
| 82018 | 2000 SD_{13} | — | September 21, 2000 | Socorro | LINEAR | EOS | 3.7 km | MPC · JPL |
| 82019 | 2000 SK_{23} | — | September 26, 2000 | Višnjan Observatory | K. Korlević | · | 8.8 km | MPC · JPL |
| 82020 | 2000 SZ_{23} | — | September 23, 2000 | Socorro | LINEAR | H | 990 m | MPC · JPL |
| 82021 | 2000 SJ_{25} | — | September 23, 2000 | Socorro | LINEAR | TIR | 6.4 km | MPC · JPL |
| 82022 | 2000 SQ_{29} | — | September 24, 2000 | Socorro | LINEAR | (43176) | 4.3 km | MPC · JPL |
| 82023 | 2000 SG_{34} | — | September 24, 2000 | Socorro | LINEAR | 3:2 | 11 km | MPC · JPL |
| 82024 | 2000 SB_{46} | — | September 22, 2000 | Socorro | LINEAR | CYB | 8.0 km | MPC · JPL |
| 82025 | 2000 SM_{60} | — | September 24, 2000 | Socorro | LINEAR | · | 5.0 km | MPC · JPL |
| 82026 | 2000 SG_{68} | — | September 24, 2000 | Socorro | LINEAR | HYG | 4.8 km | MPC · JPL |
| 82027 | 2000 SJ_{72} | — | September 24, 2000 | Socorro | LINEAR | CYB | 7.8 km | MPC · JPL |
| 82028 | 2000 SF_{82} | — | September 24, 2000 | Socorro | LINEAR | HYG | 5.9 km | MPC · JPL |
| 82029 | 2000 SK_{91} | — | September 23, 2000 | Socorro | LINEAR | · | 6.5 km | MPC · JPL |
| 82030 | 2000 SG_{93} | — | September 23, 2000 | Socorro | LINEAR | URS | 6.4 km | MPC · JPL |
| 82031 | 2000 SP_{98} | — | September 23, 2000 | Socorro | LINEAR | · | 5.8 km | MPC · JPL |
| 82032 | 2000 SQ_{103} | — | September 24, 2000 | Socorro | LINEAR | · | 4.9 km | MPC · JPL |
| 82033 | 2000 SC_{127} | — | September 24, 2000 | Socorro | LINEAR | · | 4.7 km | MPC · JPL |
| 82034 | 2000 SE_{134} | — | September 23, 2000 | Socorro | LINEAR | · | 7.2 km | MPC · JPL |
| 82035 | 2000 SP_{155} | — | September 24, 2000 | Socorro | LINEAR | · | 6.7 km | MPC · JPL |
| 82036 | 2000 SF_{162} | — | September 21, 2000 | Haleakala | NEAT | HYG | 5.5 km | MPC · JPL |
| 82037 | 2000 SJ_{182} | — | September 20, 2000 | Socorro | LINEAR | · | 8.6 km | MPC · JPL |
| 82038 | 2000 SF_{184} | — | September 20, 2000 | Haleakala | NEAT | EUP | 6.9 km | MPC · JPL |
| 82039 | 2000 SG_{186} | — | September 21, 2000 | Kitt Peak | Spacewatch | · | 3.3 km | MPC · JPL |
| 82040 | 2000 SZ_{189} | — | September 23, 2000 | Socorro | LINEAR | · | 13 km | MPC · JPL |
| 82041 | 2000 SL_{191} | — | September 24, 2000 | Socorro | LINEAR | HIL · 3:2 | 11 km | MPC · JPL |
| 82042 | 2000 SR_{203} | — | September 24, 2000 | Socorro | LINEAR | CYB | 6.1 km | MPC · JPL |
| 82043 | 2000 SN_{238} | — | September 26, 2000 | Socorro | LINEAR | 3:2 | 12 km | MPC · JPL |
| 82044 | 2000 SP_{238} | — | September 26, 2000 | Socorro | LINEAR | 3:2 | 14 km | MPC · JPL |
| 82045 | 2000 SB_{241} | — | September 25, 2000 | Socorro | LINEAR | H | 1.1 km | MPC · JPL |
| 82046 | 2000 SA_{246} | — | September 24, 2000 | Socorro | LINEAR | HYG | 5.9 km | MPC · JPL |
| 82047 | 2000 SX_{256} | — | September 24, 2000 | Socorro | LINEAR | · | 4.2 km | MPC · JPL |
| 82048 | 2000 ST_{274} | — | September 28, 2000 | Socorro | LINEAR | · | 8.3 km | MPC · JPL |
| 82049 | 2000 SL_{291} | — | September 27, 2000 | Socorro | LINEAR | · | 7.4 km | MPC · JPL |
| 82050 | 2000 SW_{312} | — | September 27, 2000 | Socorro | LINEAR | TIR | 4.9 km | MPC · JPL |
| 82051 | 2000 SQ_{314} | — | September 28, 2000 | Socorro | LINEAR | · | 10 km | MPC · JPL |
| 82052 | 2000 SR_{349} | — | September 29, 2000 | Anderson Mesa | LONEOS | · | 4.0 km | MPC · JPL |
| 82053 | 2000 SZ_{370} | — | September 23, 2000 | Mauna Kea | B. Gladman, J. J. Kavelaars | · | 4.4 km | MPC · JPL |
| 82054 | 2000 TG_{39} | — | October 1, 2000 | Socorro | LINEAR | · | 8.2 km | MPC · JPL |
| 82055 | 2000 TY_{40} | — | October 1, 2000 | Socorro | LINEAR | L5 | 25 km | MPC · JPL |
| 82056 | 2000 TD_{50} | — | October 1, 2000 | Socorro | LINEAR | · | 4.0 km | MPC · JPL |
| 82057 | 2000 UB_{24} | — | October 24, 2000 | Socorro | LINEAR | · | 9.6 km | MPC · JPL |
| 82058 | 2000 UT_{27} | — | October 24, 2000 | Socorro | LINEAR | (1118) | 12 km | MPC · JPL |
| 82059 | 2000 UM_{30} | — | October 31, 2000 | Socorro | LINEAR | H | 1.7 km | MPC · JPL |
| 82060 | 2000 WX_{8} | — | November 20, 2000 | Socorro | LINEAR | H | 1.7 km | MPC · JPL |
| 82061 | 2000 WF_{49} | — | November 21, 2000 | Socorro | LINEAR | H | 1.6 km | MPC · JPL |
| 82062 | 2000 WY_{66} | — | November 21, 2000 | Socorro | LINEAR | H | 1.4 km | MPC · JPL |
| 82063 | 2000 WE_{125} | — | November 26, 2000 | Socorro | LINEAR | · | 3.8 km | MPC · JPL |
| 82064 | 2000 WZ_{158} | — | November 19, 2000 | Socorro | LINEAR | H | 1.1 km | MPC · JPL |
| 82065 | 2000 XB_{15} | — | December 5, 2000 | Socorro | LINEAR | H | 1.4 km | MPC · JPL |
| 82066 | 2000 XG_{15} | — | December 5, 2000 | Socorro | LINEAR | H | 1.7 km | MPC · JPL |
| 82067 | 2000 XD_{45} | — | December 5, 2000 | Socorro | LINEAR | H | 1.3 km | MPC · JPL |
| 82068 | 2000 XR_{45} | — | December 15, 2000 | Socorro | LINEAR | H | 1.2 km | MPC · JPL |
| 82069 | 2000 YW_{12} | — | December 24, 2000 | Haleakala | NEAT | H | 980 m | MPC · JPL |
| 82070 | 2000 YT_{28} | — | December 28, 2000 | Socorro | LINEAR | H | 1.3 km | MPC · JPL |
| 82071 Debrecen | 2000 YA_{32} | Debrecen | December 31, 2000 | Piszkéstető | K. Sárneczky, L. Kiss | · | 2.6 km | MPC · JPL |
| 82072 | 2000 YJ_{62} | — | December 30, 2000 | Socorro | LINEAR | · | 2.2 km | MPC · JPL |
| 82073 | 2000 YP_{115} | — | December 30, 2000 | Socorro | LINEAR | (883) | 2.2 km | MPC · JPL |
| 82074 | 2000 YE_{119} | — | December 31, 2000 | Anderson Mesa | LONEOS | H | 2.7 km | MPC · JPL |
| 82075 | 2000 YW_{134} | — | December 26, 2000 | Kitt Peak | Spacewatch | res · 3:8 · moon | 413 km | MPC · JPL |
| 82076 | 2001 AU_{25} | — | January 4, 2001 | Fair Oaks Ranch | J. V. McClusky | H | 1.2 km | MPC · JPL |
| 82077 | 2001 AG_{44} | — | January 7, 2001 | Socorro | LINEAR | H | 1.5 km | MPC · JPL |
| 82078 | 2001 AH_{46} | — | January 15, 2001 | Socorro | LINEAR | H | 1.9 km | MPC · JPL |
| 82079 | 2001 BV_{2} | — | January 18, 2001 | Socorro | LINEAR | H | 1.2 km | MPC · JPL |
| 82080 | 2001 BH_{5} | — | January 19, 2001 | Socorro | LINEAR | H | 1 km | MPC · JPL |
| 82081 | 2001 BC_{40} | — | January 21, 2001 | Socorro | LINEAR | H | 1.1 km | MPC · JPL |
| 82082 | 2001 BD_{51} | — | January 27, 2001 | Haleakala | NEAT | H | 950 m | MPC · JPL |
| 82083 | 2001 BN_{62} | — | January 26, 2001 | Socorro | LINEAR | · | 3.0 km | MPC · JPL |
| 82084 | 2001 BJ_{70} | — | January 30, 2001 | Haleakala | NEAT | H | 1.1 km | MPC · JPL |
| 82085 | 2001 CL_{20} | — | February 3, 2001 | Socorro | LINEAR | H | 1.6 km | MPC · JPL |
| 82086 | 2001 CE_{32} | — | February 13, 2001 | Socorro | LINEAR | H | 1.1 km | MPC · JPL |
| 82087 | 2001 DR_{2} | — | February 16, 2001 | Kitt Peak | Spacewatch | · | 1.3 km | MPC · JPL |
| 82088 | 2001 DP_{47} | — | February 17, 2001 | Haleakala | NEAT | H | 920 m | MPC · JPL |
| 82089 | 2001 DM_{64} | — | February 19, 2001 | Socorro | LINEAR | · | 1.7 km | MPC · JPL |
| 82090 | 2001 DT_{78} | — | February 22, 2001 | Kitt Peak | Spacewatch | MAS | 1.5 km | MPC · JPL |
| 82091 | 2001 DE_{81} | — | February 26, 2001 | Oizumi | T. Kobayashi | · | 3.0 km | MPC · JPL |
| 82092 Kalocsa | 2001 DV_{86} | Kalocsa | February 27, 2001 | Piszkéstető | K. Sárneczky, Derekas, A. | NYS | 1.9 km | MPC · JPL |
| 82093 | 2001 ET_{12} | — | March 13, 2001 | Socorro | LINEAR | H | 1.5 km | MPC · JPL |
| 82094 | 2001 EN_{17} | — | March 15, 2001 | Socorro | LINEAR | PHO | 2.9 km | MPC · JPL |
| 82095 | 2001 EE_{23} | — | March 15, 2001 | Kitt Peak | Spacewatch | · | 1.6 km | MPC · JPL |
| 82096 | 2001 FW_{6} | — | March 19, 2001 | Socorro | LINEAR | · | 1.8 km | MPC · JPL |
| 82097 | 2001 FD_{7} | — | March 19, 2001 | Anderson Mesa | LONEOS | · | 3.7 km | MPC · JPL |
| 82098 | 2001 FS_{14} | — | March 19, 2001 | Anderson Mesa | LONEOS | · | 2.5 km | MPC · JPL |
| 82099 | 2001 FK_{16} | — | March 19, 2001 | Anderson Mesa | LONEOS | · | 1.9 km | MPC · JPL |
| 82100 | 2001 FT_{17} | — | March 19, 2001 | Anderson Mesa | LONEOS | · | 1.3 km | MPC · JPL |

== 82101–82200 ==
back to top

| Designation | | | Discovery | | | Properties | | Ref |
| Permanent | Provisional | Named after | Date | Site | Discoverer(s) | Category | Diam. | Ref |
|---|---|---|---|---|---|---|---|---|
| 82101 | 2001 FB_{21} | — | March 19, 2001 | Anderson Mesa | LONEOS | · | 1.6 km | MPC · JPL |
| 82102 | 2001 FM_{21} | — | March 21, 2001 | Anderson Mesa | LONEOS | · | 2.9 km | MPC · JPL |
| 82103 | 2001 FB_{22} | — | March 21, 2001 | Anderson Mesa | LONEOS | · | 2.8 km | MPC · JPL |
| 82104 | 2001 FF_{25} | — | March 18, 2001 | Socorro | LINEAR | · | 1.6 km | MPC · JPL |
| 82105 | 2001 FG_{26} | — | March 18, 2001 | Socorro | LINEAR | · | 2.4 km | MPC · JPL |
| 82106 | 2001 FG_{45} | — | March 18, 2001 | Socorro | LINEAR | fast | 1.6 km | MPC · JPL |
| 82107 | 2001 FV_{45} | — | March 18, 2001 | Socorro | LINEAR | · | 1.4 km | MPC · JPL |
| 82108 | 2001 FA_{46} | — | March 18, 2001 | Socorro | LINEAR | · | 1.8 km | MPC · JPL |
| 82109 | 2001 FT_{46} | — | March 18, 2001 | Socorro | LINEAR | · | 2.1 km | MPC · JPL |
| 82110 | 2001 FE_{48} | — | March 18, 2001 | Socorro | LINEAR | · | 1.9 km | MPC · JPL |
| 82111 | 2001 FP_{50} | — | March 18, 2001 | Socorro | LINEAR | · | 3.4 km | MPC · JPL |
| 82112 | 2001 FE_{55} | — | March 20, 2001 | Socorro | LINEAR | · | 2.5 km | MPC · JPL |
| 82113 | 2001 FG_{61} | — | March 19, 2001 | Socorro | LINEAR | · | 3.8 km | MPC · JPL |
| 82114 | 2001 FO_{66} | — | March 19, 2001 | Socorro | LINEAR | (2076) | 1.6 km | MPC · JPL |
| 82115 | 2001 FH_{67} | — | March 19, 2001 | Socorro | LINEAR | · | 1.4 km | MPC · JPL |
| 82116 | 2001 FK_{71} | — | March 19, 2001 | Socorro | LINEAR | V | 1.0 km | MPC · JPL |
| 82117 | 2001 FM_{72} | — | March 19, 2001 | Socorro | LINEAR | · | 1.8 km | MPC · JPL |
| 82118 | 2001 FG_{73} | — | March 19, 2001 | Socorro | LINEAR | · | 1.3 km | MPC · JPL |
| 82119 | 2001 FA_{76} | — | March 19, 2001 | Socorro | LINEAR | · | 2.9 km | MPC · JPL |
| 82120 | 2001 FG_{76} | — | March 19, 2001 | Socorro | LINEAR | · | 1.8 km | MPC · JPL |
| 82121 | 2001 FQ_{77} | — | March 19, 2001 | Socorro | LINEAR | · | 2.4 km | MPC · JPL |
| 82122 | 2001 FR_{77} | — | March 19, 2001 | Socorro | LINEAR | · | 2.5 km | MPC · JPL |
| 82123 | 2001 FY_{77} | — | March 19, 2001 | Socorro | LINEAR | · | 2.2 km | MPC · JPL |
| 82124 | 2001 FO_{78} | — | March 19, 2001 | Socorro | LINEAR | · | 2.0 km | MPC · JPL |
| 82125 | 2001 FM_{82} | — | March 23, 2001 | Socorro | LINEAR | · | 3.0 km | MPC · JPL |
| 82126 | 2001 FS_{86} | — | March 21, 2001 | Anderson Mesa | LONEOS | · | 3.3 km | MPC · JPL |
| 82127 | 2001 FX_{89} | — | March 27, 2001 | Kitt Peak | Spacewatch | · | 1.7 km | MPC · JPL |
| 82128 | 2001 FC_{91} | — | March 26, 2001 | Socorro | LINEAR | · | 1.6 km | MPC · JPL |
| 82129 | 2001 FW_{99} | — | March 16, 2001 | Socorro | LINEAR | · | 1.7 km | MPC · JPL |
| 82130 | 2001 FX_{99} | — | March 16, 2001 | Socorro | LINEAR | · | 1.6 km | MPC · JPL |
| 82131 | 2001 FH_{110} | — | March 18, 2001 | Socorro | LINEAR | V | 1.5 km | MPC · JPL |
| 82132 | 2001 FF_{111} | — | March 18, 2001 | Socorro | LINEAR | · | 2.6 km | MPC · JPL |
| 82133 | 2001 FD_{113} | — | March 18, 2001 | Haleakala | NEAT | PHO | 1.9 km | MPC · JPL |
| 82134 | 2001 FL_{119} | — | March 20, 2001 | Haleakala | NEAT | · | 2.1 km | MPC · JPL |
| 82135 | 2001 FU_{120} | — | March 26, 2001 | Socorro | LINEAR | · | 1.1 km | MPC · JPL |
| 82136 | 2001 FF_{121} | — | March 26, 2001 | Socorro | LINEAR | · | 1.6 km | MPC · JPL |
| 82137 | 2001 FB_{123} | — | March 23, 2001 | Anderson Mesa | LONEOS | · | 1.2 km | MPC · JPL |
| 82138 | 2001 FU_{123} | — | March 23, 2001 | Anderson Mesa | LONEOS | V | 1.5 km | MPC · JPL |
| 82139 | 2001 FB_{124} | — | March 23, 2001 | Anderson Mesa | LONEOS | · | 1.8 km | MPC · JPL |
| 82140 | 2001 FE_{124} | — | March 23, 2001 | Anderson Mesa | LONEOS | · | 2.6 km | MPC · JPL |
| 82141 | 2001 FG_{130} | — | March 29, 2001 | Socorro | LINEAR | · | 1.4 km | MPC · JPL |
| 82142 | 2001 FV_{130} | — | March 20, 2001 | Kitt Peak | Spacewatch | · | 4.6 km | MPC · JPL |
| 82143 | 2001 FF_{134} | — | March 20, 2001 | Haleakala | NEAT | · | 1.6 km | MPC · JPL |
| 82144 | 2001 FG_{135} | — | March 21, 2001 | Anderson Mesa | LONEOS | H | 1.2 km | MPC · JPL |
| 82145 | 2001 FJ_{144} | — | March 23, 2001 | Anderson Mesa | LONEOS | · | 1.3 km | MPC · JPL |
| 82146 | 2001 FM_{150} | — | March 24, 2001 | Anderson Mesa | LONEOS | · | 1.8 km | MPC · JPL |
| 82147 | 2001 FB_{156} | — | March 26, 2001 | Haleakala | NEAT | · | 1.2 km | MPC · JPL |
| 82148 | 2001 FE_{159} | — | March 29, 2001 | Anderson Mesa | LONEOS | · | 1.3 km | MPC · JPL |
| 82149 | 2001 FG_{162} | — | March 30, 2001 | Haleakala | NEAT | · | 1.6 km | MPC · JPL |
| 82150 | 2001 FM_{162} | — | March 30, 2001 | Haleakala | NEAT | · | 2.9 km | MPC · JPL |
| 82151 | 2001 FB_{165} | — | March 19, 2001 | Anderson Mesa | LONEOS | H | 1.1 km | MPC · JPL |
| 82152 | 2001 FR_{169} | — | March 23, 2001 | Cima Ekar | ADAS | · | 1.2 km | MPC · JPL |
| 82153 Alemigliorini | 2001 FT_{169} | Alemigliorini | March 23, 2001 | Cima Ekar | ADAS | · | 4.0 km | MPC · JPL |
| 82154 | 2001 FS_{170} | — | March 24, 2001 | Socorro | LINEAR | · | 3.1 km | MPC · JPL |
| 82155 | 2001 FZ_{173} | — | March 24, 2001 | Kitt Peak | Spacewatch | SDO | 212 km | MPC · JPL |
| 82156 | 2001 FJ_{175} | — | March 31, 2001 | Socorro | LINEAR | · | 2.2 km | MPC · JPL |
| 82157 | 2001 FM_{185} | — | March 26, 2001 | Kitt Peak | M. W. Buie | other TNO · moon | 143 km | MPC · JPL |
| 82158 | 2001 FP_{185} | — | March 26, 2001 | Kitt Peak | M. W. Buie | SDO | 332 km | MPC · JPL |
| 82159 | 2001 FY_{192} | — | March 27, 2001 | Haleakala | NEAT | · | 2.2 km | MPC · JPL |
| 82160 | 2001 FF_{195} | — | March 24, 2001 | Socorro | LINEAR | · | 1.4 km | MPC · JPL |
| 82161 | 2001 GC_{4} | — | April 14, 2001 | Farra d'Isonzo | Farra d'Isonzo | · | 1.4 km | MPC · JPL |
| 82162 | 2001 GO_{6} | — | April 14, 2001 | Haleakala | NEAT | · | 2.6 km | MPC · JPL |
| 82163 | 2001 GA_{11} | — | April 15, 2001 | Haleakala | NEAT | · | 1.8 km | MPC · JPL |
| 82164 | 2001 GF_{11} | — | April 1, 2001 | Anderson Mesa | LONEOS | H · slow | 1.1 km | MPC · JPL |
| 82165 | 2001 HC_{1} | — | April 17, 2001 | Socorro | LINEAR | · | 3.9 km | MPC · JPL |
| 82166 | 2001 HA_{2} | — | April 17, 2001 | Socorro | LINEAR | V | 1.4 km | MPC · JPL |
| 82167 | 2001 HV_{2} | — | April 17, 2001 | Socorro | LINEAR | · | 1.9 km | MPC · JPL |
| 82168 | 2001 HW_{3} | — | April 17, 2001 | Desert Beaver | W. K. Y. Yeung | · | 1.6 km | MPC · JPL |
| 82169 | 2001 HY_{3} | — | April 18, 2001 | Reedy Creek | J. Broughton | · | 1.6 km | MPC · JPL |
| 82170 | 2001 HR_{7} | — | April 17, 2001 | Desert Beaver | W. K. Y. Yeung | · | 1.4 km | MPC · JPL |
| 82171 | 2001 HO_{9} | — | April 16, 2001 | Socorro | LINEAR | ERI | 4.1 km | MPC · JPL |
| 82172 | 2001 HP_{9} | — | April 16, 2001 | Socorro | LINEAR | · | 1.5 km | MPC · JPL |
| 82173 | 2001 HS_{10} | — | April 16, 2001 | Socorro | LINEAR | · | 3.7 km | MPC · JPL |
| 82174 | 2001 HC_{11} | — | April 18, 2001 | Socorro | LINEAR | · | 1.1 km | MPC · JPL |
| 82175 | 2001 HV_{11} | — | April 18, 2001 | Socorro | LINEAR | · | 1.3 km | MPC · JPL |
| 82176 | 2001 HA_{12} | — | April 18, 2001 | Socorro | LINEAR | · | 2.8 km | MPC · JPL |
| 82177 | 2001 HJ_{12} | — | April 18, 2001 | Socorro | LINEAR | · | 1.4 km | MPC · JPL |
| 82178 | 2001 HB_{14} | — | April 18, 2001 | Desert Beaver | W. K. Y. Yeung | · | 1.4 km | MPC · JPL |
| 82179 | 2001 HE_{16} | — | April 22, 2001 | Desert Beaver | W. K. Y. Yeung | · | 1.6 km | MPC · JPL |
| 82180 | 2001 HJ_{16} | — | April 23, 2001 | Desert Beaver | W. K. Y. Yeung | · | 2.0 km | MPC · JPL |
| 82181 | 2001 HV_{19} | — | April 24, 2001 | Kitt Peak | Spacewatch | · | 2.2 km | MPC · JPL |
| 82182 | 2001 HN_{22} | — | April 22, 2001 | Desert Beaver | W. K. Y. Yeung | NYS | 2.3 km | MPC · JPL |
| 82183 | 2001 HR_{22} | — | April 25, 2001 | Desert Beaver | W. K. Y. Yeung | · | 1.8 km | MPC · JPL |
| 82184 | 2001 HW_{22} | — | April 26, 2001 | Desert Beaver | W. K. Y. Yeung | · | 1.9 km | MPC · JPL |
| 82185 | 2001 HD_{23} | — | April 27, 2001 | Reedy Creek | J. Broughton | · | 2.1 km | MPC · JPL |
| 82186 | 2001 HX_{24} | — | April 28, 2001 | Farpoint | G. Hug | · | 1.1 km | MPC · JPL |
| 82187 | 2001 HJ_{27} | — | April 27, 2001 | Socorro | LINEAR | · | 2.7 km | MPC · JPL |
| 82188 | 2001 HN_{27} | — | April 27, 2001 | Socorro | LINEAR | · | 2.5 km | MPC · JPL |
| 82189 | 2001 HN_{28} | — | April 27, 2001 | Socorro | LINEAR | fast | 3.1 km | MPC · JPL |
| 82190 | 2001 HY_{29} | — | April 27, 2001 | Socorro | LINEAR | · | 2.2 km | MPC · JPL |
| 82191 | 2001 HA_{30} | — | April 27, 2001 | Socorro | LINEAR | · | 1.7 km | MPC · JPL |
| 82192 | 2001 HX_{31} | — | April 28, 2001 | Desert Beaver | W. K. Y. Yeung | · | 3.0 km | MPC · JPL |
| 82193 | 2001 HA_{34} | — | April 27, 2001 | Socorro | LINEAR | · | 1.4 km | MPC · JPL |
| 82194 | 2001 HC_{34} | — | April 27, 2001 | Socorro | LINEAR | · | 2.6 km | MPC · JPL |
| 82195 | 2001 HJ_{34} | — | April 27, 2001 | Socorro | LINEAR | · | 2.3 km | MPC · JPL |
| 82196 | 2001 HU_{34} | — | April 27, 2001 | Socorro | LINEAR | NYS · | 2.6 km | MPC · JPL |
| 82197 | 2001 HH_{35} | — | April 27, 2001 | Socorro | LINEAR | fast | 8.2 km | MPC · JPL |
| 82198 | 2001 HC_{36} | — | April 29, 2001 | Socorro | LINEAR | (2076) | 3.4 km | MPC · JPL |
| 82199 | 2001 HG_{36} | — | April 29, 2001 | Socorro | LINEAR | · | 1.7 km | MPC · JPL |
| 82200 | 2001 HO_{36} | — | April 29, 2001 | Socorro | LINEAR | · | 1.8 km | MPC · JPL |

== 82201–82300 ==
back to top

| Designation | | | Discovery | | | Properties | | Ref |
| Permanent | Provisional | Named after | Date | Site | Discoverer(s) | Category | Diam. | Ref |
|---|---|---|---|---|---|---|---|---|
| 82201 | 2001 HU_{36} | — | April 29, 2001 | Socorro | LINEAR | · | 1.9 km | MPC · JPL |
| 82202 | 2001 HB_{37} | — | April 29, 2001 | Socorro | LINEAR | · | 1.9 km | MPC · JPL |
| 82203 | 2001 HH_{38} | — | April 30, 2001 | Desert Beaver | W. K. Y. Yeung | · | 3.1 km | MPC · JPL |
| 82204 | 2001 HL_{39} | — | April 26, 2001 | Kitt Peak | Spacewatch | · | 2.5 km | MPC · JPL |
| 82205 | 2001 HW_{39} | — | April 26, 2001 | Kitt Peak | Spacewatch | · | 2.5 km | MPC · JPL |
| 82206 | 2001 HY_{40} | — | April 27, 2001 | Socorro | LINEAR | · | 4.7 km | MPC · JPL |
| 82207 | 2001 HH_{41} | — | April 27, 2001 | Socorro | LINEAR | JUN | 4.4 km | MPC · JPL |
| 82208 | 2001 HP_{42} | — | April 16, 2001 | Socorro | LINEAR | · | 2.8 km | MPC · JPL |
| 82209 | 2001 HA_{45} | — | April 16, 2001 | Anderson Mesa | LONEOS | · | 1.9 km | MPC · JPL |
| 82210 | 2001 HH_{45} | — | April 16, 2001 | Anderson Mesa | LONEOS | · | 1.3 km | MPC · JPL |
| 82211 | 2001 HG_{46} | — | April 17, 2001 | Kitt Peak | Spacewatch | · | 2.4 km | MPC · JPL |
| 82212 | 2001 HZ_{46} | — | April 18, 2001 | Kitt Peak | Spacewatch | NYS · | 3.4 km | MPC · JPL |
| 82213 | 2001 HK_{49} | — | April 21, 2001 | Socorro | LINEAR | · | 1.8 km | MPC · JPL |
| 82214 | 2001 HZ_{52} | — | April 23, 2001 | Socorro | LINEAR | · | 1.8 km | MPC · JPL |
| 82215 | 2001 HE_{53} | — | April 23, 2001 | Socorro | LINEAR | · | 1.5 km | MPC · JPL |
| 82216 | 2001 HL_{53} | — | April 23, 2001 | Socorro | LINEAR | · | 2.1 km | MPC · JPL |
| 82217 | 2001 HU_{53} | — | April 23, 2001 | Kitt Peak | Spacewatch | · | 2.4 km | MPC · JPL |
| 82218 | 2001 HW_{53} | — | April 24, 2001 | Anderson Mesa | LONEOS | · | 3.1 km | MPC · JPL |
| 82219 | 2001 HA_{55} | — | April 24, 2001 | Socorro | LINEAR | · | 6.1 km | MPC · JPL |
| 82220 | 2001 HH_{55} | — | April 24, 2001 | Socorro | LINEAR | · | 1.6 km | MPC · JPL |
| 82221 | 2001 HO_{55} | — | April 24, 2001 | Socorro | LINEAR | · | 2.9 km | MPC · JPL |
| 82222 | 2001 HV_{55} | — | April 24, 2001 | Socorro | LINEAR | · | 2.0 km | MPC · JPL |
| 82223 | 2001 HN_{56} | — | April 24, 2001 | Haleakala | NEAT | · | 1.5 km | MPC · JPL |
| 82224 | 2001 HC_{59} | — | April 21, 2001 | Socorro | LINEAR | (2076) | 2.5 km | MPC · JPL |
| 82225 | 2001 HO_{59} | — | April 23, 2001 | Socorro | LINEAR | · | 3.3 km | MPC · JPL |
| 82226 | 2001 HD_{61} | — | April 24, 2001 | Socorro | LINEAR | · | 1.8 km | MPC · JPL |
| 82227 | 2001 HS_{62} | — | April 26, 2001 | Anderson Mesa | LONEOS | · | 1.3 km | MPC · JPL |
| 82228 | 2001 HU_{64} | — | April 27, 2001 | Haleakala | NEAT | · | 4.0 km | MPC · JPL |
| 82229 | 2001 HW_{64} | — | April 27, 2001 | Haleakala | NEAT | · | 1.6 km | MPC · JPL |
| 82230 | 2001 HL_{65} | — | April 30, 2001 | Socorro | LINEAR | · | 1.5 km | MPC · JPL |
| 82231 | 2001 HO_{67} | — | April 16, 2001 | Anderson Mesa | LONEOS | NYS | 2.0 km | MPC · JPL |
| 82232 Heuberger | 2001 JU | Heuberger | May 11, 2001 | Winterthur | M. Griesser | · | 1.5 km | MPC · JPL |
| 82233 | 2001 JF_{1} | — | May 2, 2001 | Kitt Peak | Spacewatch | · | 1.7 km | MPC · JPL |
| 82234 | 2001 JT_{1} | — | May 11, 2001 | Haleakala | NEAT | NYS | 2.3 km | MPC · JPL |
| 82235 | 2001 JE_{3} | — | May 15, 2001 | Anderson Mesa | LONEOS | · | 2.5 km | MPC · JPL |
| 82236 | 2001 JF_{3} | — | May 15, 2001 | Anderson Mesa | LONEOS | · | 2.5 km | MPC · JPL |
| 82237 | 2001 JF_{4} | — | May 15, 2001 | Haleakala | NEAT | · | 1.5 km | MPC · JPL |
| 82238 | 2001 JN_{4} | — | May 15, 2001 | Palomar | NEAT | EOS | 4.6 km | MPC · JPL |
| 82239 | 2001 JD_{5} | — | May 15, 2001 | Anderson Mesa | LONEOS | · | 1.7 km | MPC · JPL |
| 82240 | 2001 JQ_{6} | — | May 14, 2001 | Palomar | NEAT | · | 1.8 km | MPC · JPL |
| 82241 | 2001 JR_{6} | — | May 14, 2001 | Palomar | NEAT | · | 2.0 km | MPC · JPL |
| 82242 | 2001 JO_{8} | — | May 15, 2001 | Anderson Mesa | LONEOS | · | 1.3 km | MPC · JPL |
| 82243 | 2001 JN_{9} | — | May 15, 2001 | Haleakala | NEAT | V | 1.7 km | MPC · JPL |
| 82244 | 2001 JO_{9} | — | May 15, 2001 | Haleakala | NEAT | · | 1.4 km | MPC · JPL |
| 82245 | 2001 JM_{10} | — | May 15, 2001 | Anderson Mesa | LONEOS | · | 1.8 km | MPC · JPL |
| 82246 | 2001 JP_{10} | — | May 15, 2001 | Anderson Mesa | LONEOS | · | 2.7 km | MPC · JPL |
| 82247 | 2001 JR_{10} | — | May 15, 2001 | Anderson Mesa | LONEOS | · | 2.1 km | MPC · JPL |
| 82248 | 2001 KM_{1} | — | May 17, 2001 | Socorro | LINEAR | · | 2.8 km | MPC · JPL |
| 82249 | 2001 KO_{1} | — | May 17, 2001 | Socorro | LINEAR | · | 3.2 km | MPC · JPL |
| 82250 | 2001 KW_{2} | — | May 21, 2001 | Socorro | LINEAR | slow | 2.8 km | MPC · JPL |
| 82251 | 2001 KZ_{3} | — | May 17, 2001 | Socorro | LINEAR | MAS | 1.2 km | MPC · JPL |
| 82252 | 2001 KY_{4} | — | May 17, 2001 | Socorro | LINEAR | · | 2.8 km | MPC · JPL |
| 82253 | 2001 KM_{6} | — | May 17, 2001 | Socorro | LINEAR | · | 1.8 km | MPC · JPL |
| 82254 | 2001 KL_{7} | — | May 18, 2001 | Socorro | LINEAR | V | 1.4 km | MPC · JPL |
| 82255 | 2001 KX_{7} | — | May 18, 2001 | Socorro | LINEAR | NYS | 2.2 km | MPC · JPL |
| 82256 | 2001 KM_{8} | — | May 18, 2001 | Socorro | LINEAR | PHO · moon | 4.1 km | MPC · JPL |
| 82257 | 2001 KW_{8} | — | May 18, 2001 | Socorro | LINEAR | · | 6.8 km | MPC · JPL |
| 82258 | 2001 KG_{10} | — | May 18, 2001 | Socorro | LINEAR | · | 2.6 km | MPC · JPL |
| 82259 | 2001 KP_{10} | — | May 18, 2001 | Socorro | LINEAR | · | 1.9 km | MPC · JPL |
| 82260 | 2001 KZ_{10} | — | May 18, 2001 | Socorro | LINEAR | V | 1.6 km | MPC · JPL |
| 82261 | 2001 KZ_{12} | — | May 18, 2001 | Socorro | LINEAR | · | 1.4 km | MPC · JPL |
| 82262 | 2001 KG_{13} | — | May 18, 2001 | Socorro | LINEAR | · | 1.6 km | MPC · JPL |
| 82263 | 2001 KH_{13} | — | May 18, 2001 | Socorro | LINEAR | · | 1.8 km | MPC · JPL |
| 82264 | 2001 KB_{14} | — | May 18, 2001 | Socorro | LINEAR | · | 2.4 km | MPC · JPL |
| 82265 | 2001 KO_{14} | — | May 18, 2001 | Socorro | LINEAR | · | 2.7 km | MPC · JPL |
| 82266 | 2001 KB_{15} | — | May 18, 2001 | Socorro | LINEAR | · | 1.6 km | MPC · JPL |
| 82267 | 2001 KP_{15} | — | May 18, 2001 | Socorro | LINEAR | · | 1.9 km | MPC · JPL |
| 82268 | 2001 KO_{16} | — | May 18, 2001 | Socorro | LINEAR | (2076) | 1.9 km | MPC · JPL |
| 82269 | 2001 KV_{16} | — | May 18, 2001 | Socorro | LINEAR | · | 2.5 km | MPC · JPL |
| 82270 | 2001 KZ_{16} | — | May 18, 2001 | Socorro | LINEAR | · | 1.7 km | MPC · JPL |
| 82271 | 2001 KL_{19} | — | May 21, 2001 | Socorro | LINEAR | V | 1.4 km | MPC · JPL |
| 82272 | 2001 KV_{20} | — | May 21, 2001 | Anderson Mesa | LONEOS | · | 1.9 km | MPC · JPL |
| 82273 | 2001 KG_{21} | — | May 22, 2001 | Anderson Mesa | LONEOS | · | 4.5 km | MPC · JPL |
| 82274 | 2001 KJ_{22} | — | May 17, 2001 | Socorro | LINEAR | · | 4.5 km | MPC · JPL |
| 82275 | 2001 KM_{22} | — | May 17, 2001 | Socorro | LINEAR | · | 1.5 km | MPC · JPL |
| 82276 | 2001 KH_{23} | — | May 17, 2001 | Socorro | LINEAR | · | 3.0 km | MPC · JPL |
| 82277 | 2001 KC_{24} | — | May 17, 2001 | Socorro | LINEAR | · | 2.9 km | MPC · JPL |
| 82278 | 2001 KE_{25} | — | May 17, 2001 | Socorro | LINEAR | · | 1.8 km | MPC · JPL |
| 82279 | 2001 KE_{26} | — | May 17, 2001 | Socorro | LINEAR | V | 1.3 km | MPC · JPL |
| 82280 | 2001 KY_{26} | — | May 17, 2001 | Socorro | LINEAR | NYS | 2.1 km | MPC · JPL |
| 82281 | 2001 KN_{27} | — | May 17, 2001 | Socorro | LINEAR | · | 2.4 km | MPC · JPL |
| 82282 | 2001 KY_{28} | — | May 21, 2001 | Socorro | LINEAR | · | 1.7 km | MPC · JPL |
| 82283 | 2001 KT_{29} | — | May 21, 2001 | Socorro | LINEAR | · | 1.9 km | MPC · JPL |
| 82284 | 2001 KJ_{30} | — | May 21, 2001 | Socorro | LINEAR | · | 1.6 km | MPC · JPL |
| 82285 | 2001 KS_{31} | — | May 22, 2001 | Socorro | LINEAR | · | 1.7 km | MPC · JPL |
| 82286 | 2001 KE_{34} | — | May 18, 2001 | Socorro | LINEAR | · | 2.7 km | MPC · JPL |
| 82287 | 2001 KM_{35} | — | May 18, 2001 | Socorro | LINEAR | · | 4.5 km | MPC · JPL |
| 82288 | 2001 KV_{35} | — | May 18, 2001 | Socorro | LINEAR | · | 3.4 km | MPC · JPL |
| 82289 | 2001 KW_{35} | — | May 18, 2001 | Socorro | LINEAR | · | 1.6 km | MPC · JPL |
| 82290 | 2001 KL_{36} | — | May 18, 2001 | Socorro | LINEAR | · | 1.9 km | MPC · JPL |
| 82291 | 2001 KB_{37} | — | May 21, 2001 | Socorro | LINEAR | · | 2.7 km | MPC · JPL |
| 82292 | 2001 KE_{37} | — | May 21, 2001 | Socorro | LINEAR | NYS | 2.1 km | MPC · JPL |
| 82293 | 2001 KJ_{38} | — | May 22, 2001 | Socorro | LINEAR | · | 2.3 km | MPC · JPL |
| 82294 | 2001 KO_{38} | — | May 22, 2001 | Socorro | LINEAR | · | 3.3 km | MPC · JPL |
| 82295 | 2001 KR_{39} | — | May 22, 2001 | Socorro | LINEAR | · | 2.4 km | MPC · JPL |
| 82296 | 2001 KA_{40} | — | May 22, 2001 | Socorro | LINEAR | · | 4.6 km | MPC · JPL |
| 82297 | 2001 KB_{40} | — | May 22, 2001 | Socorro | LINEAR | · | 2.6 km | MPC · JPL |
| 82298 | 2001 KL_{40} | — | May 22, 2001 | Socorro | LINEAR | · | 2.8 km | MPC · JPL |
| 82299 | 2001 KB_{43} | — | May 22, 2001 | Socorro | LINEAR | · | 1.7 km | MPC · JPL |
| 82300 | 2001 KE_{43} | — | May 22, 2001 | Socorro | LINEAR | · | 2.8 km | MPC · JPL |

== 82301–82400 ==
back to top

| Designation | | | Discovery | | | Properties | | Ref |
| Permanent | Provisional | Named after | Date | Site | Discoverer(s) | Category | Diam. | Ref |
|---|---|---|---|---|---|---|---|---|
| 82301 | 2001 KR_{43} | — | May 22, 2001 | Socorro | LINEAR | · | 1.6 km | MPC · JPL |
| 82302 | 2001 KW_{43} | — | May 22, 2001 | Socorro | LINEAR | RAF | 2.4 km | MPC · JPL |
| 82303 | 2001 KV_{44} | — | May 22, 2001 | Socorro | LINEAR | · | 2.7 km | MPC · JPL |
| 82304 | 2001 KM_{45} | — | May 22, 2001 | Socorro | LINEAR | · | 2.1 km | MPC · JPL |
| 82305 | 2001 KP_{45} | — | May 22, 2001 | Socorro | LINEAR | V | 1.4 km | MPC · JPL |
| 82306 | 2001 KN_{48} | — | May 24, 2001 | Socorro | LINEAR | NYS | 2.6 km | MPC · JPL |
| 82307 | 2001 KX_{48} | — | May 24, 2001 | Socorro | LINEAR | · | 2.7 km | MPC · JPL |
| 82308 | 2001 KC_{49} | — | May 24, 2001 | Socorro | LINEAR | V | 1.2 km | MPC · JPL |
| 82309 | 2001 KL_{49} | — | May 24, 2001 | Socorro | LINEAR | MAS | 1.7 km | MPC · JPL |
| 82310 | 2001 KQ_{51} | — | May 26, 2001 | Socorro | LINEAR | · | 3.8 km | MPC · JPL |
| 82311 | 2001 KB_{54} | — | May 21, 2001 | Socorro | LINEAR | V | 1.3 km | MPC · JPL |
| 82312 | 2001 KJ_{54} | — | May 22, 2001 | Haleakala | NEAT | (2076) | 2.9 km | MPC · JPL |
| 82313 | 2001 KY_{55} | — | May 22, 2001 | Socorro | LINEAR | · | 1.4 km | MPC · JPL |
| 82314 | 2001 KT_{57} | — | May 25, 2001 | Socorro | LINEAR | PHO | 2.4 km | MPC · JPL |
| 82315 | 2001 KF_{59} | — | May 26, 2001 | Socorro | LINEAR | · | 2.7 km | MPC · JPL |
| 82316 | 2001 KY_{59} | — | May 26, 2001 | Socorro | LINEAR | · | 3.6 km | MPC · JPL |
| 82317 | 2001 KZ_{59} | — | May 26, 2001 | Socorro | LINEAR | · | 4.9 km | MPC · JPL |
| 82318 | 2001 KL_{60} | — | May 16, 2001 | Haleakala | NEAT | · | 3.5 km | MPC · JPL |
| 82319 | 2001 KD_{61} | — | May 17, 2001 | Haleakala | NEAT | · | 1.5 km | MPC · JPL |
| 82320 | 2001 KY_{61} | — | May 18, 2001 | Socorro | LINEAR | V | 1.9 km | MPC · JPL |
| 82321 | 2001 KE_{69} | — | May 21, 2001 | Kitt Peak | Spacewatch | · | 1.9 km | MPC · JPL |
| 82322 | 2001 KU_{74} | — | May 26, 2001 | Kitt Peak | Spacewatch | · | 2.1 km | MPC · JPL |
| 82323 | 2001 KP_{75} | — | May 26, 2001 | Socorro | LINEAR | · | 4.7 km | MPC · JPL |
| 82324 | 2001 LF_{1} | — | June 13, 2001 | Socorro | LINEAR | · | 3.0 km | MPC · JPL |
| 82325 | 2001 LM_{1} | — | June 13, 2001 | Socorro | LINEAR | · | 3.0 km | MPC · JPL |
| 82326 | 2001 LU_{1} | — | June 13, 2001 | Socorro | LINEAR | EUN | 3.1 km | MPC · JPL |
| 82327 | 2001 LE_{3} | — | June 13, 2001 | Socorro | LINEAR | · | 2.3 km | MPC · JPL |
| 82328 | 2001 LH_{3} | — | June 13, 2001 | Socorro | LINEAR | EUN | 3.2 km | MPC · JPL |
| 82329 | 2001 LC_{4} | — | June 13, 2001 | Socorro | LINEAR | · | 3.1 km | MPC · JPL |
| 82330 | 2001 LA_{5} | — | June 12, 2001 | Haleakala | NEAT | · | 1.6 km | MPC · JPL |
| 82331 | 2001 LC_{5} | — | June 15, 2001 | Palomar | NEAT | · | 1.9 km | MPC · JPL |
| 82332 Las Vegas | 2001 LV_{6} | Las Vegas | June 15, 2001 | Palomar | NEAT | HNS | 2.7 km | MPC · JPL |
| 82333 | 2001 LF_{7} | — | June 15, 2001 | Socorro | LINEAR | · | 7.3 km | MPC · JPL |
| 82334 | 2001 LF_{9} | — | June 15, 2001 | Socorro | LINEAR | V | 1.7 km | MPC · JPL |
| 82335 | 2001 LA_{10} | — | June 15, 2001 | Socorro | LINEAR | V | 1.4 km | MPC · JPL |
| 82336 | 2001 LH_{11} | — | June 15, 2001 | Socorro | LINEAR | · | 2.8 km | MPC · JPL |
| 82337 | 2001 LM_{11} | — | June 15, 2001 | Socorro | LINEAR | · | 3.5 km | MPC · JPL |
| 82338 | 2001 LX_{12} | — | June 15, 2001 | Socorro | LINEAR | · | 2.5 km | MPC · JPL |
| 82339 | 2001 LB_{13} | — | June 15, 2001 | Palomar | NEAT | · | 5.1 km | MPC · JPL |
| 82340 | 2001 LO_{14} | — | June 15, 2001 | Socorro | LINEAR | · | 4.0 km | MPC · JPL |
| 82341 | 2001 LO_{15} | — | June 12, 2001 | Anderson Mesa | LONEOS | V | 1.4 km | MPC · JPL |
| 82342 | 2001 LR_{16} | — | June 14, 2001 | Kitt Peak | Spacewatch | · | 2.5 km | MPC · JPL |
| 82343 | 2001 LS_{16} | — | June 14, 2001 | Kitt Peak | Spacewatch | · | 1.7 km | MPC · JPL |
| 82344 | 2001 LH_{17} | — | June 15, 2001 | Socorro | LINEAR | HNS | 3.2 km | MPC · JPL |
| 82345 | 2001 LO_{17} | — | June 15, 2001 | Socorro | LINEAR | · | 1.9 km | MPC · JPL |
| 82346 Hakos | 2001 LD_{18} | Hakos | June 10, 2001 | Hakos | Husar, D. | · | 1.9 km | MPC · JPL |
| 82347 | 2001 LO_{18} | — | June 15, 2001 | Socorro | LINEAR | slow | 2.9 km | MPC · JPL |
| 82348 | 2001 LB_{19} | — | June 15, 2001 | Socorro | LINEAR | ADE | 6.7 km | MPC · JPL |
| 82349 | 2001 LD_{19} | — | June 15, 2001 | Socorro | LINEAR | · | 4.2 km | MPC · JPL |
| 82350 | 2001 LF_{19} | — | June 15, 2001 | Socorro | LINEAR | EOS | 5.2 km | MPC · JPL |
| 82351 | 2001 MS_{1} | — | June 18, 2001 | Palomar | NEAT | · | 2.9 km | MPC · JPL |
| 82352 | 2001 MU_{1} | — | June 18, 2001 | Palomar | NEAT | URS | 12 km | MPC · JPL |
| 82353 | 2001 MA_{2} | — | June 18, 2001 | Palomar | NEAT | · | 1.9 km | MPC · JPL |
| 82354 | 2001 MJ_{2} | — | June 19, 2001 | Socorro | LINEAR | · | 5.1 km | MPC · JPL |
| 82355 | 2001 MY_{2} | — | June 16, 2001 | Palomar | NEAT | · | 2.8 km | MPC · JPL |
| 82356 | 2001 MB_{3} | — | June 16, 2001 | Palomar | NEAT | · | 13 km | MPC · JPL |
| 82357 | 2001 MB_{4} | — | June 16, 2001 | Socorro | LINEAR | V | 1.4 km | MPC · JPL |
| 82358 | 2001 MU_{5} | — | June 18, 2001 | Palomar | NEAT | · | 2.4 km | MPC · JPL |
| 82359 | 2001 MG_{6} | — | June 21, 2001 | Palomar | NEAT | · | 4.6 km | MPC · JPL |
| 82360 | 2001 MP_{6} | — | June 21, 2001 | Palomar | NEAT | · | 4.9 km | MPC · JPL |
| 82361 Benitoloyola | 2001 MV_{6} | Benitoloyola | June 23, 2001 | Badlands | Dyvig, R. | · | 4.7 km | MPC · JPL |
| 82362 | 2001 MX_{6} | — | June 17, 2001 | Kitt Peak | Spacewatch | · | 4.9 km | MPC · JPL |
| 82363 | 2001 MF_{7} | — | June 21, 2001 | Socorro | LINEAR | · | 5.5 km | MPC · JPL |
| 82364 | 2001 MW_{7} | — | June 20, 2001 | Reedy Creek | J. Broughton | fast | 2.6 km | MPC · JPL |
| 82365 | 2001 MP_{8} | — | June 25, 2001 | Ondřejov | P. Kušnirák | · | 5.8 km | MPC · JPL |
| 82366 | 2001 MR_{8} | — | June 16, 2001 | Haleakala | NEAT | · | 3.6 km | MPC · JPL |
| 82367 | 2001 MK_{9} | — | June 21, 2001 | Palomar | NEAT | · | 7.0 km | MPC · JPL |
| 82368 | 2001 MT_{10} | — | June 21, 2001 | Palomar | NEAT | NYS | 2.6 km | MPC · JPL |
| 82369 | 2001 MF_{12} | — | June 21, 2001 | Palomar | NEAT | DOR | 4.9 km | MPC · JPL |
| 82370 | 2001 MD_{14} | — | June 26, 2001 | Reedy Creek | J. Broughton | · | 1.3 km | MPC · JPL |
| 82371 | 2001 MM_{14} | — | June 28, 2001 | Anderson Mesa | LONEOS | EUN | 5.0 km | MPC · JPL |
| 82372 | 2001 ME_{15} | — | June 19, 2001 | Palomar | NEAT | · | 2.6 km | MPC · JPL |
| 82373 | 2001 MH_{15} | — | June 21, 2001 | Palomar | NEAT | · | 5.7 km | MPC · JPL |
| 82374 | 2001 ML_{15} | — | June 25, 2001 | Palomar | NEAT | · | 2.0 km | MPC · JPL |
| 82375 | 2001 MN_{15} | — | June 25, 2001 | Palomar | NEAT | · | 7.3 km | MPC · JPL |
| 82376 | 2001 MC_{16} | — | June 27, 2001 | Palomar | NEAT | · | 2.4 km | MPC · JPL |
| 82377 | 2001 MG_{16} | — | June 27, 2001 | Palomar | NEAT | · | 3.5 km | MPC · JPL |
| 82378 | 2001 MB_{17} | — | June 27, 2001 | Palomar | NEAT | HOF | 5.2 km | MPC · JPL |
| 82379 | 2001 MJ_{17} | — | June 27, 2001 | Palomar | NEAT | · | 3.9 km | MPC · JPL |
| 82380 | 2001 MU_{17} | — | June 28, 2001 | Anderson Mesa | LONEOS | · | 12 km | MPC · JPL |
| 82381 | 2001 MH_{18} | — | June 23, 2001 | Palomar | NEAT | · | 4.5 km | MPC · JPL |
| 82382 | 2001 MZ_{18} | — | June 29, 2001 | Anderson Mesa | LONEOS | · | 2.8 km | MPC · JPL |
| 82383 | 2001 MD_{19} | — | June 29, 2001 | Anderson Mesa | LONEOS | EUN | 3.0 km | MPC · JPL |
| 82384 | 2001 MV_{20} | — | June 25, 2001 | Palomar | NEAT | · | 6.1 km | MPC · JPL |
| 82385 | 2001 MV_{21} | — | June 28, 2001 | Palomar | NEAT | (5) | 3.1 km | MPC · JPL |
| 82386 | 2001 MM_{22} | — | June 23, 2001 | Palomar | NEAT | · | 2.5 km | MPC · JPL |
| 82387 | 2001 MW_{24} | — | June 16, 2001 | Anderson Mesa | LONEOS | EUN | 2.8 km | MPC · JPL |
| 82388 | 2001 MX_{24} | — | June 16, 2001 | Anderson Mesa | LONEOS | · | 2.7 km | MPC · JPL |
| 82389 | 2001 MH_{25} | — | June 17, 2001 | Anderson Mesa | LONEOS | NYS | 2.5 km | MPC · JPL |
| 82390 | 2001 ML_{26} | — | June 19, 2001 | Haleakala | NEAT | NYS | 4.9 km | MPC · JPL |
| 82391 | 2001 MU_{26} | — | June 19, 2001 | Haleakala | NEAT | · | 3.5 km | MPC · JPL |
| 82392 | 2001 MQ_{28} | — | June 26, 2001 | Palomar | NEAT | · | 2.7 km | MPC · JPL |
| 82393 | 2001 MV_{28} | — | June 27, 2001 | Anderson Mesa | LONEOS | V | 1.5 km | MPC · JPL |
| 82394 | 2001 MN_{29} | — | June 27, 2001 | Anderson Mesa | LONEOS | · | 2.6 km | MPC · JPL |
| 82395 | 2001 NK_{1} | — | July 12, 2001 | Palomar | NEAT | · | 4.8 km | MPC · JPL |
| 82396 | 2001 NR_{1} | — | July 10, 2001 | Palomar | NEAT | · | 4.0 km | MPC · JPL |
| 82397 | 2001 NS_{2} | — | July 13, 2001 | Palomar | NEAT | · | 2.7 km | MPC · JPL |
| 82398 | 2001 NZ_{3} | — | July 13, 2001 | Palomar | NEAT | · | 5.4 km | MPC · JPL |
| 82399 | 2001 NS_{4} | — | July 13, 2001 | Palomar | NEAT | KOR | 2.5 km | MPC · JPL |
| 82400 | 2001 NE_{6} | — | July 13, 2001 | Haleakala | NEAT | · | 3.0 km | MPC · JPL |

== 82401–82500 ==
back to top

| Designation | | | Discovery | | | Properties | | Ref |
| Permanent | Provisional | Named after | Date | Site | Discoverer(s) | Category | Diam. | Ref |
|---|---|---|---|---|---|---|---|---|
| 82401 | 2001 NF_{6} | — | July 13, 2001 | Haleakala | NEAT | · | 4.2 km | MPC · JPL |
| 82402 | 2001 NG_{6} | — | July 14, 2001 | Palomar | NEAT | · | 2.9 km | MPC · JPL |
| 82403 | 2001 NR_{7} | — | July 13, 2001 | Palomar | NEAT | · | 4.5 km | MPC · JPL |
| 82404 | 2001 NV_{8} | — | July 14, 2001 | Palomar | NEAT | · | 2.8 km | MPC · JPL |
| 82405 | 2001 NX_{8} | — | July 14, 2001 | Palomar | NEAT | · | 4.8 km | MPC · JPL |
| 82406 | 2001 NE_{9} | — | July 13, 2001 | Palomar | NEAT | VER | 7.4 km | MPC · JPL |
| 82407 | 2001 NM_{10} | — | July 14, 2001 | Haleakala | NEAT | MAS | 1.2 km | MPC · JPL |
| 82408 | 2001 NR_{10} | — | July 14, 2001 | Haleakala | NEAT | · | 9.1 km | MPC · JPL |
| 82409 | 2001 NS_{10} | — | July 14, 2001 | Haleakala | NEAT | · | 1.7 km | MPC · JPL |
| 82410 | 2001 NU_{11} | — | July 12, 2001 | Palomar | NEAT | · | 2.1 km | MPC · JPL |
| 82411 | 2001 NN_{12} | — | July 13, 2001 | Haleakala | NEAT | · | 2.7 km | MPC · JPL |
| 82412 | 2001 NN_{14} | — | July 14, 2001 | Haleakala | NEAT | · | 3.4 km | MPC · JPL |
| 82413 | 2001 NQ_{15} | — | July 13, 2001 | Palomar | NEAT | EUN | 2.4 km | MPC · JPL |
| 82414 | 2001 NZ_{15} | — | July 14, 2001 | Palomar | NEAT | · | 5.5 km | MPC · JPL |
| 82415 | 2001 NM_{16} | — | July 14, 2001 | Haleakala | NEAT | · | 3.6 km | MPC · JPL |
| 82416 | 2001 NP_{16} | — | July 14, 2001 | Palomar | NEAT | · | 3.2 km | MPC · JPL |
| 82417 | 2001 NU_{16} | — | July 14, 2001 | Palomar | NEAT | · | 4.4 km | MPC · JPL |
| 82418 | 2001 NC_{17} | — | July 14, 2001 | Palomar | NEAT | · | 2.2 km | MPC · JPL |
| 82419 | 2001 ND_{17} | — | July 14, 2001 | Palomar | NEAT | · | 4.3 km | MPC · JPL |
| 82420 | 2001 NN_{17} | — | July 14, 2001 | Palomar | NEAT | · | 2.4 km | MPC · JPL |
| 82421 | 2001 NC_{18} | — | July 9, 2001 | Palomar | NEAT | · | 2.7 km | MPC · JPL |
| 82422 | 2001 NM_{18} | — | July 12, 2001 | Palomar | NEAT | PHO | 2.2 km | MPC · JPL |
| 82423 | 2001 NZ_{18} | — | July 13, 2001 | Palomar | NEAT | EUN | 3.1 km | MPC · JPL |
| 82424 | 2001 NJ_{19} | — | July 14, 2001 | Palomar | NEAT | HNS | 2.8 km | MPC · JPL |
| 82425 | 2001 NQ_{19} | — | July 15, 2001 | Haleakala | NEAT | · | 3.0 km | MPC · JPL |
| 82426 | 2001 NB_{20} | — | July 12, 2001 | Palomar | NEAT | HNS | 2.8 km | MPC · JPL |
| 82427 | 2001 NA_{21} | — | July 14, 2001 | Palomar | NEAT | · | 8.1 km | MPC · JPL |
| 82428 | 2001 NN_{21} | — | July 14, 2001 | Palomar | NEAT | · | 2.4 km | MPC · JPL |
| 82429 | 2001 NZ_{21} | — | July 14, 2001 | Palomar | NEAT | (5) | 2.8 km | MPC · JPL |
| 82430 | 2001 NG_{22} | — | July 14, 2001 | Haleakala | NEAT | · | 1.6 km | MPC · JPL |
| 82431 | 2001 OF | — | July 16, 2001 | Anderson Mesa | LONEOS | · | 2.8 km | MPC · JPL |
| 82432 | 2001 OJ_{1} | — | July 18, 2001 | Palomar | NEAT | slow | 2.2 km | MPC · JPL |
| 82433 | 2001 OV_{1} | — | July 18, 2001 | Palomar | NEAT | · | 6.5 km | MPC · JPL |
| 82434 | 2001 OR_{2} | — | July 17, 2001 | Anderson Mesa | LONEOS | · | 3.6 km | MPC · JPL |
| 82435 | 2001 OX_{3} | — | July 18, 2001 | Palomar | NEAT | · | 8.4 km | MPC · JPL |
| 82436 | 2001 OF_{5} | — | July 17, 2001 | Anderson Mesa | LONEOS | · | 3.2 km | MPC · JPL |
| 82437 | 2001 OT_{5} | — | July 17, 2001 | Anderson Mesa | LONEOS | · | 7.8 km | MPC · JPL |
| 82438 | 2001 OK_{6} | — | July 17, 2001 | Anderson Mesa | LONEOS | KON | 4.9 km | MPC · JPL |
| 82439 | 2001 OO_{6} | — | July 17, 2001 | Anderson Mesa | LONEOS | VER | 9.0 km | MPC · JPL |
| 82440 | 2001 OP_{6} | — | July 17, 2001 | Anderson Mesa | LONEOS | · | 7.6 km | MPC · JPL |
| 82441 | 2001 ON_{7} | — | July 17, 2001 | Anderson Mesa | LONEOS | · | 2.5 km | MPC · JPL |
| 82442 | 2001 ON_{8} | — | July 17, 2001 | Anderson Mesa | LONEOS | · | 1.8 km | MPC · JPL |
| 82443 | 2001 OV_{8} | — | July 17, 2001 | Anderson Mesa | LONEOS | · | 4.0 km | MPC · JPL |
| 82444 | 2001 OB_{9} | — | July 20, 2001 | Anderson Mesa | LONEOS | · | 2.7 km | MPC · JPL |
| 82445 | 2001 OC_{9} | — | July 20, 2001 | Anderson Mesa | LONEOS | · | 5.1 km | MPC · JPL |
| 82446 | 2001 OH_{9} | — | July 20, 2001 | Anderson Mesa | LONEOS | · | 7.0 km | MPC · JPL |
| 82447 | 2001 OJ_{9} | — | July 20, 2001 | Anderson Mesa | LONEOS | ADE | 6.5 km | MPC · JPL |
| 82448 | 2001 OM_{9} | — | July 20, 2001 | Reedy Creek | J. Broughton | MAS | 1.4 km | MPC · JPL |
| 82449 | 2001 ON_{9} | — | July 20, 2001 | Reedy Creek | J. Broughton | · | 2.9 km | MPC · JPL |
| 82450 | 2001 OE_{10} | — | July 19, 2001 | Palomar | NEAT | (5) | 2.9 km | MPC · JPL |
| 82451 | 2001 ON_{10} | — | July 19, 2001 | Palomar | NEAT | slow | 1.6 km | MPC · JPL |
| 82452 | 2001 OB_{11} | — | July 20, 2001 | Palomar | NEAT | · | 2.5 km | MPC · JPL |
| 82453 | 2001 OD_{11} | — | July 20, 2001 | Palomar | NEAT | · | 4.1 km | MPC · JPL |
| 82454 | 2001 OT_{12} | — | July 21, 2001 | San Marcello | A. Boattini, L. Tesi | EOS | 4.5 km | MPC · JPL |
| 82455 | 2001 OE_{14} | — | July 20, 2001 | Socorro | LINEAR | · | 3.5 km | MPC · JPL |
| 82456 | 2001 OF_{14} | — | July 20, 2001 | Socorro | LINEAR | AEG | 10 km | MPC · JPL |
| 82457 | 2001 OH_{14} | — | July 20, 2001 | Socorro | LINEAR | · | 5.7 km | MPC · JPL |
| 82458 | 2001 OJ_{14} | — | July 20, 2001 | Socorro | LINEAR | · | 2.4 km | MPC · JPL |
| 82459 | 2001 OZ_{14} | — | July 18, 2001 | Palomar | NEAT | EUN | 2.7 km | MPC · JPL |
| 82460 | 2001 OB_{16} | — | July 19, 2001 | Haleakala | NEAT | · | 3.4 km | MPC · JPL |
| 82461 | 2001 OC_{16} | — | July 19, 2001 | Haleakala | NEAT | NYS | 2.8 km | MPC · JPL |
| 82462 | 2001 OE_{16} | — | July 21, 2001 | Palomar | NEAT | · | 5.8 km | MPC · JPL |
| 82463 Mluigiaborsi | 2001 OV_{16} | Mluigiaborsi | July 21, 2001 | San Marcello | L. Tesi, G. Forti | HYG | 8.5 km | MPC · JPL |
| 82464 Jaroslavboček | 2001 OE_{17} | Jaroslavboček | July 21, 2001 | Ondřejov | P. Pravec, L. Kotková | · | 4.1 km | MPC · JPL |
| 82465 | 2001 OA_{18} | — | July 17, 2001 | Haleakala | NEAT | NYS | 3.5 km | MPC · JPL |
| 82466 | 2001 OF_{18} | — | July 17, 2001 | Haleakala | NEAT | V | 2.0 km | MPC · JPL |
| 82467 | 2001 OS_{19} | — | July 18, 2001 | Haleakala | NEAT | V | 1.5 km | MPC · JPL |
| 82468 | 2001 OF_{20} | — | July 21, 2001 | Anderson Mesa | LONEOS | EUP | 7.7 km | MPC · JPL |
| 82469 | 2001 OL_{20} | — | July 21, 2001 | Anderson Mesa | LONEOS | TIR | 5.7 km | MPC · JPL |
| 82470 | 2001 OT_{21} | — | July 21, 2001 | Anderson Mesa | LONEOS | · | 3.0 km | MPC · JPL |
| 82471 | 2001 OW_{21} | — | July 21, 2001 | Anderson Mesa | LONEOS | MAR | 3.4 km | MPC · JPL |
| 82472 | 2001 OJ_{22} | — | July 19, 2001 | OCA-Anza | White, M., M. Collins | · | 2.7 km | MPC · JPL |
| 82473 | 2001 OR_{22} | — | July 17, 2001 | Palomar | NEAT | · | 2.7 km | MPC · JPL |
| 82474 | 2001 OB_{23} | — | July 21, 2001 | Palomar | NEAT | · | 2.1 km | MPC · JPL |
| 82475 | 2001 OP_{23} | — | July 22, 2001 | Palomar | NEAT | · | 3.7 km | MPC · JPL |
| 82476 | 2001 OA_{24} | — | July 16, 2001 | Anderson Mesa | LONEOS | NYS | 2.1 km | MPC · JPL |
| 82477 | 2001 OC_{24} | — | July 16, 2001 | Anderson Mesa | LONEOS | NEM | 4.3 km | MPC · JPL |
| 82478 | 2001 OS_{25} | — | July 18, 2001 | Haleakala | NEAT | slow | 7.7 km | MPC · JPL |
| 82479 | 2001 OU_{25} | — | July 18, 2001 | Haleakala | NEAT | · | 2.2 km | MPC · JPL |
| 82480 | 2001 OC_{30} | — | July 19, 2001 | Palomar | NEAT | · | 3.9 km | MPC · JPL |
| 82481 | 2001 OR_{32} | — | July 19, 2001 | Palomar | NEAT | · | 2.4 km | MPC · JPL |
| 82482 | 2001 OK_{33} | — | July 19, 2001 | Palomar | NEAT | · | 2.3 km | MPC · JPL |
| 82483 | 2001 OH_{34} | — | July 19, 2001 | Palomar | NEAT | · | 3.5 km | MPC · JPL |
| 82484 | 2001 OH_{36} | — | July 21, 2001 | Kitt Peak | Spacewatch | · | 5.4 km | MPC · JPL |
| 82485 | 2001 OO_{36} | — | July 21, 2001 | Kitt Peak | Spacewatch | HOF | 6.1 km | MPC · JPL |
| 82486 | 2001 OX_{36} | — | July 20, 2001 | Palomar | NEAT | · | 2.5 km | MPC · JPL |
| 82487 | 2001 OC_{37} | — | July 20, 2001 | Palomar | NEAT | · | 2.8 km | MPC · JPL |
| 82488 | 2001 OO_{37} | — | July 20, 2001 | Palomar | NEAT | · | 2.9 km | MPC · JPL |
| 82489 | 2001 OQ_{37} | — | July 20, 2001 | Palomar | NEAT | · | 5.4 km | MPC · JPL |
| 82490 | 2001 OR_{37} | — | July 20, 2001 | Palomar | NEAT | · | 6.3 km | MPC · JPL |
| 82491 | 2001 OW_{38} | — | July 20, 2001 | Palomar | NEAT | · | 2.1 km | MPC · JPL |
| 82492 | 2001 OF_{39} | — | July 20, 2001 | Palomar | NEAT | · | 2.6 km | MPC · JPL |
| 82493 | 2001 OG_{39} | — | July 20, 2001 | Palomar | NEAT | · | 3.9 km | MPC · JPL |
| 82494 | 2001 OP_{39} | — | July 20, 2001 | Palomar | NEAT | · | 3.4 km | MPC · JPL |
| 82495 | 2001 OC_{41} | — | July 21, 2001 | Palomar | NEAT | · | 3.1 km | MPC · JPL |
| 82496 | 2001 OQ_{42} | — | July 22, 2001 | Palomar | NEAT | CYB | 8.4 km | MPC · JPL |
| 82497 | 2001 OQ_{43} | — | July 22, 2001 | Palomar | NEAT | · | 3.6 km | MPC · JPL |
| 82498 | 2001 OW_{43} | — | July 23, 2001 | Palomar | NEAT | · | 5.9 km | MPC · JPL |
| 82499 | 2001 OX_{43} | — | July 23, 2001 | Palomar | NEAT | · | 4.9 km | MPC · JPL |
| 82500 | 2001 OC_{45} | — | July 16, 2001 | Anderson Mesa | LONEOS | · | 3.5 km | MPC · JPL |

== 82501–82600 ==
back to top

| Designation | | | Discovery | | | Properties | | Ref |
| Permanent | Provisional | Named after | Date | Site | Discoverer(s) | Category | Diam. | Ref |
|---|---|---|---|---|---|---|---|---|
| 82501 | 2001 OL_{45} | — | July 16, 2001 | Anderson Mesa | LONEOS | · | 2.6 km | MPC · JPL |
| 82502 | 2001 OC_{46} | — | July 16, 2001 | Anderson Mesa | LONEOS | (5) | 2.7 km | MPC · JPL |
| 82503 | 2001 OU_{46} | — | July 16, 2001 | Anderson Mesa | LONEOS | · | 2.5 km | MPC · JPL |
| 82504 | 2001 OZ_{46} | — | July 16, 2001 | Anderson Mesa | LONEOS | · | 1.9 km | MPC · JPL |
| 82505 | 2001 OD_{47} | — | July 16, 2001 | Anderson Mesa | LONEOS | · | 4.0 km | MPC · JPL |
| 82506 | 2001 OC_{48} | — | July 16, 2001 | Haleakala | NEAT | EOS | 4.8 km | MPC · JPL |
| 82507 | 2001 OQ_{48} | — | July 16, 2001 | Haleakala | NEAT | · | 5.4 km | MPC · JPL |
| 82508 | 2001 OH_{49} | — | July 17, 2001 | Anderson Mesa | LONEOS | · | 2.4 km | MPC · JPL |
| 82509 | 2001 OQ_{49} | — | July 17, 2001 | Anderson Mesa | LONEOS | · | 2.4 km | MPC · JPL |
| 82510 | 2001 OT_{49} | — | July 17, 2001 | Palomar | NEAT | · | 4.0 km | MPC · JPL |
| 82511 | 2001 OU_{49} | — | July 17, 2001 | Palomar | NEAT | NYS | 2.5 km | MPC · JPL |
| 82512 | 2001 OY_{49} | — | July 17, 2001 | Palomar | NEAT | AGN | 2.6 km | MPC · JPL |
| 82513 | 2001 OA_{50} | — | July 17, 2001 | Haleakala | NEAT | V | 1.8 km | MPC · JPL |
| 82514 | 2001 OG_{50} | — | July 19, 2001 | Haleakala | NEAT | · | 6.7 km | MPC · JPL |
| 82515 | 2001 OK_{50} | — | July 19, 2001 | Haleakala | NEAT | V | 1.6 km | MPC · JPL |
| 82516 | 2001 OH_{52} | — | July 21, 2001 | Palomar | NEAT | · | 6.8 km | MPC · JPL |
| 82517 | 2001 OP_{52} | — | July 21, 2001 | Palomar | NEAT | · | 5.2 km | MPC · JPL |
| 82518 | 2001 OF_{53} | — | July 21, 2001 | Palomar | NEAT | · | 3.8 km | MPC · JPL |
| 82519 | 2001 OG_{53} | — | July 21, 2001 | Palomar | NEAT | · | 4.0 km | MPC · JPL |
| 82520 | 2001 OP_{53} | — | July 21, 2001 | Palomar | NEAT | EUN | 3.4 km | MPC · JPL |
| 82521 | 2001 OC_{54} | — | July 21, 2001 | Palomar | NEAT | · | 3.3 km | MPC · JPL |
| 82522 | 2001 OD_{54} | — | July 21, 2001 | Palomar | NEAT | · | 5.3 km | MPC · JPL |
| 82523 | 2001 OL_{54} | — | July 22, 2001 | Palomar | NEAT | · | 4.1 km | MPC · JPL |
| 82524 | 2001 OE_{55} | — | July 22, 2001 | Palomar | NEAT | · | 2.8 km | MPC · JPL |
| 82525 | 2001 OM_{55} | — | July 22, 2001 | Palomar | NEAT | URS | 9.2 km | MPC · JPL |
| 82526 | 2001 OV_{55} | — | July 22, 2001 | Palomar | NEAT | NAE | 6.7 km | MPC · JPL |
| 82527 | 2001 OD_{57} | — | July 16, 2001 | Anderson Mesa | LONEOS | MAS | 1.2 km | MPC · JPL |
| 82528 | 2001 OW_{57} | — | July 19, 2001 | Palomar | NEAT | slow | 4.3 km | MPC · JPL |
| 82529 | 2001 OH_{58} | — | July 20, 2001 | Anderson Mesa | LONEOS | · | 3.3 km | MPC · JPL |
| 82530 | 2001 OW_{60} | — | July 21, 2001 | Haleakala | NEAT | · | 2.9 km | MPC · JPL |
| 82531 | 2001 OM_{61} | — | July 21, 2001 | Haleakala | NEAT | · | 2.3 km | MPC · JPL |
| 82532 | 2001 OL_{63} | — | July 19, 2001 | Haleakala | NEAT | (5) | 2.4 km | MPC · JPL |
| 82533 | 2001 OB_{64} | — | July 23, 2001 | Haleakala | NEAT | · | 3.1 km | MPC · JPL |
| 82534 | 2001 OE_{64} | — | July 23, 2001 | Haleakala | NEAT | · | 4.2 km | MPC · JPL |
| 82535 | 2001 OF_{64} | — | July 24, 2001 | Haleakala | NEAT | · | 3.1 km | MPC · JPL |
| 82536 | 2001 OM_{64} | — | July 24, 2001 | Haleakala | NEAT | · | 3.0 km | MPC · JPL |
| 82537 | 2001 OS_{64} | — | July 27, 2001 | Palomar | NEAT | · | 2.5 km | MPC · JPL |
| 82538 | 2001 OJ_{65} | — | July 24, 2001 | Palomar | NEAT | NYS | 2.4 km | MPC · JPL |
| 82539 | 2001 ON_{65} | — | July 22, 2001 | Palomar | NEAT | HNS | 3.8 km | MPC · JPL |
| 82540 | 2001 OC_{66} | — | July 22, 2001 | Anderson Mesa | LONEOS | · | 5.2 km | MPC · JPL |
| 82541 | 2001 OC_{67} | — | July 25, 2001 | Haleakala | NEAT | · | 3.6 km | MPC · JPL |
| 82542 | 2001 OH_{67} | — | July 26, 2001 | Haleakala | NEAT | · | 2.6 km | MPC · JPL |
| 82543 | 2001 OQ_{67} | — | July 27, 2001 | Haleakala | NEAT | MAR · | 5.2 km | MPC · JPL |
| 82544 | 2001 OU_{67} | — | July 16, 2001 | Anderson Mesa | LONEOS | · | 2.5 km | MPC · JPL |
| 82545 | 2001 OW_{67} | — | July 16, 2001 | Anderson Mesa | LONEOS | · | 2.7 km | MPC · JPL |
| 82546 | 2001 OB_{68} | — | July 16, 2001 | Anderson Mesa | LONEOS | NYS | 2.5 km | MPC · JPL |
| 82547 | 2001 OB_{69} | — | July 18, 2001 | Palomar | NEAT | · | 5.2 km | MPC · JPL |
| 82548 | 2001 OH_{69} | — | July 18, 2001 | Haleakala | NEAT | · | 3.6 km | MPC · JPL |
| 82549 | 2001 OU_{69} | — | July 19, 2001 | Anderson Mesa | LONEOS | · | 1.6 km | MPC · JPL |
| 82550 | 2001 OB_{71} | — | July 20, 2001 | Palomar | NEAT | · | 3.3 km | MPC · JPL |
| 82551 | 2001 OE_{71} | — | July 20, 2001 | Palomar | NEAT | · | 2.1 km | MPC · JPL |
| 82552 | 2001 OH_{71} | — | July 20, 2001 | Palomar | NEAT | · | 3.2 km | MPC · JPL |
| 82553 | 2001 OL_{71} | — | July 20, 2001 | Palomar | NEAT | · | 2.5 km | MPC · JPL |
| 82554 | 2001 OA_{72} | — | July 21, 2001 | Anderson Mesa | LONEOS | · | 7.1 km | MPC · JPL |
| 82555 | 2001 OH_{74} | — | July 17, 2001 | Palomar | NEAT | KOR | 2.9 km | MPC · JPL |
| 82556 | 2001 OE_{75} | — | July 24, 2001 | Palomar | NEAT | · | 4.9 km | MPC · JPL |
| 82557 | 2001 OO_{75} | — | July 24, 2001 | Palomar | NEAT | · | 5.6 km | MPC · JPL |
| 82558 | 2001 OM_{76} | — | July 22, 2001 | Palomar | NEAT | · | 4.3 km | MPC · JPL |
| 82559 Emilbřezina | 2001 OD_{77} | Emilbřezina | July 28, 2001 | Ondřejov | P. Pravec | · | 2.2 km | MPC · JPL |
| 82560 | 2001 OE_{78} | — | July 26, 2001 | Palomar | NEAT | V | 1.4 km | MPC · JPL |
| 82561 | 2001 OF_{78} | — | July 26, 2001 | Palomar | NEAT | · | 7.4 km | MPC · JPL |
| 82562 | 2001 OH_{78} | — | July 26, 2001 | Palomar | NEAT | · | 4.2 km | MPC · JPL |
| 82563 | 2001 OP_{78} | — | July 26, 2001 | Palomar | NEAT | · | 2.9 km | MPC · JPL |
| 82564 | 2001 OY_{79} | — | July 29, 2001 | Palomar | NEAT | HOF · fast | 5.1 km | MPC · JPL |
| 82565 | 2001 OE_{80} | — | July 29, 2001 | Palomar | NEAT | HNS | 3.0 km | MPC · JPL |
| 82566 | 2001 OP_{80} | — | July 29, 2001 | Socorro | LINEAR | EUN | 3.6 km | MPC · JPL |
| 82567 | 2001 OT_{81} | — | July 26, 2001 | Haleakala | NEAT | · | 5.8 km | MPC · JPL |
| 82568 | 2001 OX_{81} | — | July 26, 2001 | Haleakala | NEAT | EOS | 3.7 km | MPC · JPL |
| 82569 | 2001 OG_{82} | — | July 31, 2001 | Farpoint | G. Hug | · | 3.0 km | MPC · JPL |
| 82570 | 2001 OR_{82} | — | July 27, 2001 | Palomar | NEAT | PHO | 2.5 km | MPC · JPL |
| 82571 | 2001 OV_{82} | — | July 27, 2001 | Palomar | NEAT | · | 3.0 km | MPC · JPL |
| 82572 | 2001 OU_{83} | — | July 27, 2001 | Palomar | NEAT | · | 11 km | MPC · JPL |
| 82573 | 2001 OE_{85} | — | July 20, 2001 | Anderson Mesa | LONEOS | · | 6.9 km | MPC · JPL |
| 82574 | 2001 OH_{85} | — | July 20, 2001 | Anderson Mesa | LONEOS | · | 3.6 km | MPC · JPL |
| 82575 | 2001 OL_{85} | — | July 20, 2001 | Anderson Mesa | LONEOS | · | 2.3 km | MPC · JPL |
| 82576 | 2001 OW_{85} | — | July 21, 2001 | Kitt Peak | Spacewatch | · | 2.7 km | MPC · JPL |
| 82577 | 2001 OO_{86} | — | July 28, 2001 | Haleakala | NEAT | · | 2.9 km | MPC · JPL |
| 82578 | 2001 OS_{86} | — | July 28, 2001 | Haleakala | NEAT | (5) | 2.5 km | MPC · JPL |
| 82579 | 2001 OV_{86} | — | July 29, 2001 | Palomar | NEAT | · | 3.4 km | MPC · JPL |
| 82580 | 2001 OZ_{86} | — | July 29, 2001 | Palomar | NEAT | EOS | 4.9 km | MPC · JPL |
| 82581 | 2001 OC_{87} | — | July 29, 2001 | Palomar | NEAT | · | 9.9 km | MPC · JPL |
| 82582 | 2001 OG_{87} | — | July 29, 2001 | Palomar | NEAT | NAE | 8.1 km | MPC · JPL |
| 82583 | 2001 OK_{87} | — | July 29, 2001 | Palomar | NEAT | EOS | 3.7 km | MPC · JPL |
| 82584 | 2001 OL_{87} | — | July 29, 2001 | Palomar | NEAT | EUN | 3.2 km | MPC · JPL |
| 82585 | 2001 OV_{87} | — | July 30, 2001 | Palomar | NEAT | PHO | 6.3 km | MPC · JPL |
| 82586 | 2001 OH_{88} | — | July 21, 2001 | Haleakala | NEAT | EOS | 4.1 km | MPC · JPL |
| 82587 | 2001 OK_{88} | — | July 21, 2001 | Haleakala | NEAT | · | 6.2 km | MPC · JPL |
| 82588 | 2001 OX_{88} | — | July 21, 2001 | Haleakala | NEAT | · | 3.7 km | MPC · JPL |
| 82589 | 2001 OK_{89} | — | July 22, 2001 | Socorro | LINEAR | · | 2.4 km | MPC · JPL |
| 82590 | 2001 OO_{89} | — | July 22, 2001 | Socorro | LINEAR | · | 8.0 km | MPC · JPL |
| 82591 | 2001 OW_{89} | — | July 23, 2001 | Haleakala | NEAT | · | 4.3 km | MPC · JPL |
| 82592 | 2001 OM_{90} | — | July 25, 2001 | Haleakala | NEAT | · | 3.0 km | MPC · JPL |
| 82593 | 2001 OW_{90} | — | July 25, 2001 | Haleakala | NEAT | · | 4.3 km | MPC · JPL |
| 82594 | 2001 OH_{91} | — | July 29, 2001 | Palomar | NEAT | GEF | 2.8 km | MPC · JPL |
| 82595 | 2001 OY_{92} | — | July 23, 2001 | Haleakala | NEAT | · | 2.4 km | MPC · JPL |
| 82596 | 2001 OG_{93} | — | July 25, 2001 | Palomar | NEAT | EOS | 4.8 km | MPC · JPL |
| 82597 | 2001 OK_{93} | — | July 25, 2001 | Haleakala | NEAT | NYS · | 4.2 km | MPC · JPL |
| 82598 | 2001 OX_{94} | — | July 29, 2001 | Palomar | NEAT | · | 2.4 km | MPC · JPL |
| 82599 | 2001 OP_{95} | — | July 31, 2001 | Palomar | NEAT | PHO | 2.6 km | MPC · JPL |
| 82600 | 2001 OU_{95} | — | July 25, 2001 | Bergisch Gladbach | W. Bickel | · | 2.4 km | MPC · JPL |

== 82601–82700 ==
back to top

| Designation | | | Discovery | | | Properties | | Ref |
| Permanent | Provisional | Named after | Date | Site | Discoverer(s) | Category | Diam. | Ref |
|---|---|---|---|---|---|---|---|---|
| 82601 | 2001 OC_{96} | — | July 29, 2001 | Bergisch Gladbach | W. Bickel | EUN | 4.3 km | MPC · JPL |
| 82602 | 2001 OK_{96} | — | July 23, 2001 | Haleakala | NEAT | · | 3.7 km | MPC · JPL |
| 82603 | 2001 OQ_{96} | — | July 24, 2001 | Palomar | NEAT | EUN | 4.9 km | MPC · JPL |
| 82604 | 2001 OS_{96} | — | July 24, 2001 | Palomar | NEAT | · | 3.0 km | MPC · JPL |
| 82605 | 2001 OM_{97} | — | July 25, 2001 | Haleakala | NEAT | · | 6.8 km | MPC · JPL |
| 82606 | 2001 OO_{97} | — | July 25, 2001 | Haleakala | NEAT | NYS | 2.2 km | MPC · JPL |
| 82607 | 2001 OT_{97} | — | July 25, 2001 | Haleakala | NEAT | EUN | 2.7 km | MPC · JPL |
| 82608 | 2001 OD_{99} | — | July 27, 2001 | Anderson Mesa | LONEOS | HYG | 5.5 km | MPC · JPL |
| 82609 | 2001 OP_{99} | — | July 27, 2001 | Anderson Mesa | LONEOS | · | 2.9 km | MPC · JPL |
| 82610 | 2001 OS_{100} | — | July 27, 2001 | Anderson Mesa | LONEOS | NYS | 2.1 km | MPC · JPL |
| 82611 | 2001 OZ_{100} | — | July 27, 2001 | Palomar | NEAT | · | 3.0 km | MPC · JPL |
| 82612 | 2001 OD_{101} | — | July 27, 2001 | Haleakala | NEAT | · | 6.1 km | MPC · JPL |
| 82613 | 2001 OE_{101} | — | July 27, 2001 | Haleakala | NEAT | · | 3.2 km | MPC · JPL |
| 82614 | 2001 OF_{101} | — | July 27, 2001 | Haleakala | NEAT | · | 4.7 km | MPC · JPL |
| 82615 | 2001 OL_{101} | — | July 28, 2001 | Anderson Mesa | LONEOS | · | 2.7 km | MPC · JPL |
| 82616 | 2001 OP_{101} | — | July 28, 2001 | Anderson Mesa | LONEOS | · | 3.6 km | MPC · JPL |
| 82617 | 2001 OR_{101} | — | July 28, 2001 | Anderson Mesa | LONEOS | · | 2.4 km | MPC · JPL |
| 82618 | 2001 OS_{101} | — | July 28, 2001 | Anderson Mesa | LONEOS | · | 5.0 km | MPC · JPL |
| 82619 | 2001 OW_{101} | — | July 28, 2001 | Haleakala | NEAT | · | 3.5 km | MPC · JPL |
| 82620 | 2001 OB_{102} | — | July 28, 2001 | Haleakala | NEAT | · | 2.9 km | MPC · JPL |
| 82621 | 2001 OC_{102} | — | July 28, 2001 | Haleakala | NEAT | · | 7.5 km | MPC · JPL |
| 82622 | 2001 OL_{102} | — | July 28, 2001 | Haleakala | NEAT | · | 4.7 km | MPC · JPL |
| 82623 | 2001 OB_{103} | — | July 29, 2001 | Anderson Mesa | LONEOS | TIR | 7.0 km | MPC · JPL |
| 82624 | 2001 OS_{103} | — | July 29, 2001 | Anderson Mesa | LONEOS | · | 5.8 km | MPC · JPL |
| 82625 | 2001 OX_{103} | — | July 29, 2001 | Palomar | NEAT | EUN | 4.2 km | MPC · JPL |
| 82626 | 2001 OW_{104} | — | July 28, 2001 | Anderson Mesa | LONEOS | · | 3.5 km | MPC · JPL |
| 82627 | 2001 OY_{104} | — | July 28, 2001 | Anderson Mesa | LONEOS | · | 6.6 km | MPC · JPL |
| 82628 | 2001 OC_{105} | — | July 28, 2001 | Anderson Mesa | LONEOS | EOS | 4.9 km | MPC · JPL |
| 82629 | 2001 OF_{105} | — | July 28, 2001 | Anderson Mesa | LONEOS | · | 4.8 km | MPC · JPL |
| 82630 | 2001 OY_{106} | — | July 29, 2001 | Socorro | LINEAR | GEF | 3.0 km | MPC · JPL |
| 82631 | 2001 OZ_{106} | — | July 29, 2001 | Socorro | LINEAR | RAF | 2.6 km | MPC · JPL |
| 82632 | 2001 OY_{107} | — | July 30, 2001 | Socorro | LINEAR | HNS | 3.3 km | MPC · JPL |
| 82633 | 2001 OB_{108} | — | July 31, 2001 | Socorro | LINEAR | EOS · slow | 6.0 km | MPC · JPL |
| 82634 | 2001 OA_{111} | — | July 19, 2001 | Palomar | NEAT | EOS | 3.8 km | MPC · JPL |
| 82635 | 2001 OG_{111} | — | July 21, 2001 | Haleakala | NEAT | · | 2.5 km | MPC · JPL |
| 82636 | 2001 OP_{111} | — | July 27, 2001 | Anderson Mesa | LONEOS | · | 4.6 km | MPC · JPL |
| 82637 | 2001 PV | — | August 2, 2001 | Haleakala | NEAT | NYS | 1.8 km | MPC · JPL |
| 82638 Bottariclaudio | 2001 PF_{1} | Bottariclaudio | August 7, 2001 | San Marcello | L. Tesi, M. Tombelli | · | 4.6 km | MPC · JPL |
| 82639 | 2001 PO_{1} | — | August 3, 2001 | Haleakala | NEAT | · | 2.3 km | MPC · JPL |
| 82640 | 2001 PZ_{2} | — | August 3, 2001 | Haleakala | NEAT | · | 3.1 km | MPC · JPL |
| 82641 | 2001 PO_{5} | — | August 10, 2001 | Palomar | NEAT | TEL | 4.9 km | MPC · JPL |
| 82642 | 2001 PX_{5} | — | August 10, 2001 | Haleakala | NEAT | · | 5.7 km | MPC · JPL |
| 82643 | 2001 PK_{6} | — | August 10, 2001 | Haleakala | NEAT | · | 8.6 km | MPC · JPL |
| 82644 | 2001 PT_{6} | — | August 10, 2001 | Haleakala | NEAT | AGN | 2.8 km | MPC · JPL |
| 82645 | 2001 PX_{8} | — | August 11, 2001 | Haleakala | NEAT | · | 4.3 km | MPC · JPL |
| 82646 | 2001 PB_{9} | — | August 11, 2001 | Haleakala | NEAT | · | 6.4 km | MPC · JPL |
| 82647 | 2001 PS_{10} | — | August 8, 2001 | Haleakala | NEAT | · | 2.8 km | MPC · JPL |
| 82648 | 2001 PQ_{11} | — | August 11, 2001 | Palomar | NEAT | · | 2.7 km | MPC · JPL |
| 82649 | 2001 PX_{11} | — | August 11, 2001 | Palomar | NEAT | EOS | 4.6 km | MPC · JPL |
| 82650 | 2001 PG_{12} | — | August 12, 2001 | Palomar | NEAT | · | 6.4 km | MPC · JPL |
| 82651 | 2001 PT_{12} | — | August 12, 2001 | Palomar | NEAT | · | 8.4 km | MPC · JPL |
| 82652 | 2001 PZ_{12} | — | August 9, 2001 | Palomar | NEAT | GEF | 2.4 km | MPC · JPL |
| 82653 | 2001 PF_{13} | — | August 13, 2001 | Ondřejov | P. Kušnirák | · | 3.8 km | MPC · JPL |
| 82654 | 2001 PL_{13} | — | August 12, 2001 | Farpoint | G. Hug | · | 5.5 km | MPC · JPL |
| 82655 | 2001 PM_{13} | — | August 12, 2001 | Farpoint | G. Hug | · | 3.5 km | MPC · JPL |
| 82656 Puskás | 2001 PQ_{13} | Puskás | August 10, 2001 | Calar Alto | K. Sárneczky, Szabo, G. | · | 5.2 km | MPC · JPL |
| 82657 | 2001 PA_{14} | — | August 14, 2001 | San Marcello | A. Boattini, G. Forti | · | 2.8 km | MPC · JPL |
| 82658 | 2001 PA_{16} | — | August 9, 2001 | Palomar | NEAT | · | 2.5 km | MPC · JPL |
| 82659 | 2001 PD_{16} | — | August 9, 2001 | Palomar | NEAT | · | 2.3 km | MPC · JPL |
| 82660 | 2001 PG_{16} | — | August 9, 2001 | Palomar | NEAT | · | 3.1 km | MPC · JPL |
| 82661 | 2001 PM_{16} | — | August 9, 2001 | Palomar | NEAT | · | 3.1 km | MPC · JPL |
| 82662 | 2001 PY_{16} | — | August 9, 2001 | Palomar | NEAT | PHO | 2.0 km | MPC · JPL |
| 82663 | 2001 PW_{17} | — | August 9, 2001 | Palomar | NEAT | · | 11 km | MPC · JPL |
| 82664 | 2001 PX_{17} | — | August 9, 2001 | Palomar | NEAT | EOS | 3.6 km | MPC · JPL |
| 82665 | 2001 PG_{19} | — | August 10, 2001 | Palomar | NEAT | EMA | 7.0 km | MPC · JPL |
| 82666 | 2001 PD_{20} | — | August 10, 2001 | Palomar | NEAT | · | 2.1 km | MPC · JPL |
| 82667 | 2001 PM_{20} | — | August 10, 2001 | Palomar | NEAT | · | 3.6 km | MPC · JPL |
| 82668 | 2001 PP_{20} | — | August 10, 2001 | Palomar | NEAT | · | 2.1 km | MPC · JPL |
| 82669 | 2001 PZ_{20} | — | August 10, 2001 | Haleakala | NEAT | · | 5.8 km | MPC · JPL |
| 82670 | 2001 PC_{21} | — | August 10, 2001 | Haleakala | NEAT | · | 2.3 km | MPC · JPL |
| 82671 | 2001 PG_{21} | — | August 10, 2001 | Haleakala | NEAT | · | 4.6 km | MPC · JPL |
| 82672 | 2001 PQ_{21} | — | August 10, 2001 | Haleakala | NEAT | · | 5.4 km | MPC · JPL |
| 82673 | 2001 PC_{22} | — | August 10, 2001 | Haleakala | NEAT | · | 5.7 km | MPC · JPL |
| 82674 | 2001 PB_{23} | — | August 10, 2001 | Haleakala | NEAT | EOS | 4.3 km | MPC · JPL |
| 82675 | 2001 PT_{23} | — | August 11, 2001 | Haleakala | NEAT | EOS | 4.9 km | MPC · JPL |
| 82676 | 2001 PV_{23} | — | August 11, 2001 | Haleakala | NEAT | · | 3.7 km | MPC · JPL |
| 82677 | 2001 PW_{23} | — | August 11, 2001 | Haleakala | NEAT | · | 2.7 km | MPC · JPL |
| 82678 | 2001 PD_{24} | — | August 11, 2001 | Haleakala | NEAT | · | 5.5 km | MPC · JPL |
| 82679 | 2001 PN_{24} | — | August 11, 2001 | Haleakala | NEAT | HOF | 8.6 km | MPC · JPL |
| 82680 | 2001 PV_{25} | — | August 11, 2001 | Haleakala | NEAT | · | 8.3 km | MPC · JPL |
| 82681 | 2001 PY_{25} | — | August 11, 2001 | Haleakala | NEAT | NYS · | 2.7 km | MPC · JPL |
| 82682 | 2001 PC_{26} | — | August 11, 2001 | Haleakala | NEAT | · | 2.7 km | MPC · JPL |
| 82683 | 2001 PZ_{26} | — | August 11, 2001 | Haleakala | NEAT | · | 5.0 km | MPC · JPL |
| 82684 | 2001 PE_{28} | — | August 14, 2001 | Palomar | NEAT | · | 2.6 km | MPC · JPL |
| 82685 | 2001 PG_{33} | — | August 10, 2001 | Palomar | NEAT | · | 3.0 km | MPC · JPL |
| 82686 | 2001 PJ_{33} | — | August 10, 2001 | Palomar | NEAT | · | 8.1 km | MPC · JPL |
| 82687 | 2001 PO_{33} | — | August 10, 2001 | Palomar | NEAT | · | 7.0 km | MPC · JPL |
| 82688 | 2001 PQ_{33} | — | August 10, 2001 | Palomar | NEAT | · | 6.2 km | MPC · JPL |
| 82689 | 2001 PX_{33} | — | August 10, 2001 | Palomar | NEAT | EOS | 5.4 km | MPC · JPL |
| 82690 | 2001 PB_{34} | — | August 10, 2001 | Palomar | NEAT | · | 3.0 km | MPC · JPL |
| 82691 | 2001 PE_{34} | — | August 10, 2001 | Palomar | NEAT | · | 9.4 km | MPC · JPL |
| 82692 | 2001 PH_{34} | — | August 10, 2001 | Palomar | NEAT | · | 4.2 km | MPC · JPL |
| 82693 | 2001 PX_{34} | — | August 10, 2001 | Palomar | NEAT | · | 4.2 km | MPC · JPL |
| 82694 | 2001 PB_{35} | — | August 10, 2001 | Palomar | NEAT | EOS | 5.7 km | MPC · JPL |
| 82695 | 2001 PF_{35} | — | August 11, 2001 | Palomar | NEAT | · | 4.1 km | MPC · JPL |
| 82696 | 2001 PK_{35} | — | August 11, 2001 | Palomar | NEAT | MAR | 2.9 km | MPC · JPL |
| 82697 | 2001 PQ_{36} | — | August 11, 2001 | Palomar | NEAT | · | 2.8 km | MPC · JPL |
| 82698 | 2001 PS_{36} | — | August 11, 2001 | Palomar | NEAT | EUN · fast | 3.4 km | MPC · JPL |
| 82699 | 2001 PT_{36} | — | August 11, 2001 | Palomar | NEAT | MAR | 3.2 km | MPC · JPL |
| 82700 | 2001 PJ_{38} | — | August 11, 2001 | Palomar | NEAT | PHO | 5.9 km | MPC · JPL |

== 82701–82800 ==
back to top

| Designation | | | Discovery | | | Properties | | Ref |
| Permanent | Provisional | Named after | Date | Site | Discoverer(s) | Category | Diam. | Ref |
|---|---|---|---|---|---|---|---|---|
| 82701 | 2001 PQ_{39} | — | August 11, 2001 | Haleakala | NEAT | ADE | 5.7 km | MPC · JPL |
| 82702 | 2001 PZ_{39} | — | August 11, 2001 | Palomar | NEAT | EOS | 6.0 km | MPC · JPL |
| 82703 | 2001 PC_{40} | — | August 11, 2001 | Palomar | NEAT | EOS | 5.3 km | MPC · JPL |
| 82704 | 2001 PR_{40} | — | August 11, 2001 | Palomar | NEAT | GEF | 2.5 km | MPC · JPL |
| 82705 | 2001 PC_{41} | — | August 11, 2001 | Palomar | NEAT | · | 5.5 km | MPC · JPL |
| 82706 | 2001 PZ_{41} | — | August 11, 2001 | Palomar | NEAT | 615 | 5.2 km | MPC · JPL |
| 82707 | 2001 PH_{42} | — | August 12, 2001 | Palomar | NEAT | · | 4.8 km | MPC · JPL |
| 82708 | 2001 PX_{42} | — | August 12, 2001 | Palomar | NEAT | · | 3.5 km | MPC · JPL |
| 82709 | 2001 PP_{43} | — | August 13, 2001 | Haleakala | NEAT | · | 4.9 km | MPC · JPL |
| 82710 | 2001 PU_{44} | — | August 15, 2001 | Haleakala | NEAT | (1298) | 5.5 km | MPC · JPL |
| 82711 | 2001 PC_{45} | — | August 11, 2001 | Haleakala | NEAT | · | 4.8 km | MPC · JPL |
| 82712 | 2001 PD_{46} | — | August 12, 2001 | Palomar | NEAT | · | 3.0 km | MPC · JPL |
| 82713 | 2001 PH_{46} | — | August 12, 2001 | Palomar | NEAT | · | 6.1 km | MPC · JPL |
| 82714 | 2001 PE_{47} | — | August 13, 2001 | Bergisch Gladbach | W. Bickel | · | 3.4 km | MPC · JPL |
| 82715 | 2001 PP_{47} | — | August 13, 2001 | Haleakala | NEAT | · | 7.0 km | MPC · JPL |
| 82716 | 2001 PV_{47} | — | August 13, 2001 | Haleakala | NEAT | · | 6.8 km | MPC · JPL |
| 82717 | 2001 PX_{47} | — | August 14, 2001 | Haleakala | NEAT | · | 5.9 km | MPC · JPL |
| 82718 | 2001 PS_{48} | — | August 14, 2001 | Palomar | NEAT | · | 4.1 km | MPC · JPL |
| 82719 | 2001 PF_{49} | — | August 13, 2001 | Palomar | NEAT | · | 4.7 km | MPC · JPL |
| 82720 | 2001 PC_{50} | — | August 15, 2001 | Haleakala | NEAT | KOR | 3.2 km | MPC · JPL |
| 82721 | 2001 PE_{50} | — | August 15, 2001 | Haleakala | NEAT | · | 2.4 km | MPC · JPL |
| 82722 | 2001 PF_{50} | — | August 15, 2001 | Haleakala | NEAT | · | 5.0 km | MPC · JPL |
| 82723 | 2001 PN_{51} | — | August 15, 2001 | Haleakala | NEAT | · | 8.1 km | MPC · JPL |
| 82724 | 2001 PO_{51} | — | August 15, 2001 | Haleakala | NEAT | · | 4.8 km | MPC · JPL |
| 82725 | 2001 PV_{51} | — | August 15, 2001 | Haleakala | NEAT | KOR | 3.0 km | MPC · JPL |
| 82726 | 2001 PA_{53} | — | August 14, 2001 | Haleakala | NEAT | HOF | 4.8 km | MPC · JPL |
| 82727 | 2001 PK_{53} | — | August 14, 2001 | Haleakala | NEAT | · | 4.4 km | MPC · JPL |
| 82728 | 2001 PW_{55} | — | August 14, 2001 | Haleakala | NEAT | NYS | 1.5 km | MPC · JPL |
| 82729 | 2001 PD_{56} | — | August 14, 2001 | Haleakala | NEAT | · | 7.0 km | MPC · JPL |
| 82730 | 2001 PZ_{58} | — | August 14, 2001 | Haleakala | NEAT | KOR | 2.9 km | MPC · JPL |
| 82731 | 2001 PQ_{59} | — | August 14, 2001 | Haleakala | NEAT | · | 6.7 km | MPC · JPL |
| 82732 | 2001 PS_{59} | — | August 14, 2001 | Haleakala | NEAT | · | 7.5 km | MPC · JPL |
| 82733 | 2001 PU_{59} | — | August 14, 2001 | Haleakala | NEAT | · | 6.9 km | MPC · JPL |
| 82734 | 2001 PW_{59} | — | August 13, 2001 | Palomar | NEAT | · | 2.7 km | MPC · JPL |
| 82735 | 2001 PA_{62} | — | August 13, 2001 | Haleakala | NEAT | · | 3.8 km | MPC · JPL |
| 82736 | 2001 PM_{62} | — | August 13, 2001 | Palomar | NEAT | · | 8.6 km | MPC · JPL |
| 82737 | 2001 PK_{65} | — | August 12, 2001 | Palomar | NEAT | (1118) | 8.9 km | MPC · JPL |
| 82738 | 2001 QA | — | August 16, 2001 | Farpoint | Farpoint | · | 3.0 km | MPC · JPL |
| 82739 | 2001 QU | — | August 16, 2001 | Socorro | LINEAR | · | 3.4 km | MPC · JPL |
| 82740 | 2001 QY | — | August 16, 2001 | Socorro | LINEAR | NYS | 3.1 km | MPC · JPL |
| 82741 | 2001 QN_{1} | — | August 16, 2001 | Socorro | LINEAR | THM | 5.5 km | MPC · JPL |
| 82742 | 2001 QR_{2} | — | August 17, 2001 | Socorro | LINEAR | · | 4.9 km | MPC · JPL |
| 82743 | 2001 QQ_{3} | — | August 16, 2001 | Socorro | LINEAR | · | 3.0 km | MPC · JPL |
| 82744 | 2001 QU_{3} | — | August 16, 2001 | Socorro | LINEAR | · | 5.5 km | MPC · JPL |
| 82745 | 2001 QE_{4} | — | August 16, 2001 | Socorro | LINEAR | · | 4.6 km | MPC · JPL |
| 82746 | 2001 QR_{4} | — | August 16, 2001 | Socorro | LINEAR | · | 4.1 km | MPC · JPL |
| 82747 | 2001 QV_{5} | — | August 16, 2001 | Socorro | LINEAR | · | 2.6 km | MPC · JPL |
| 82748 | 2001 QD_{6} | — | August 16, 2001 | Socorro | LINEAR | · | 2.1 km | MPC · JPL |
| 82749 | 2001 QX_{6} | — | August 16, 2001 | Socorro | LINEAR | AGN | 2.4 km | MPC · JPL |
| 82750 | 2001 QB_{7} | — | August 16, 2001 | Socorro | LINEAR | · | 1.7 km | MPC · JPL |
| 82751 | 2001 QF_{7} | — | August 16, 2001 | Socorro | LINEAR | · | 2.4 km | MPC · JPL |
| 82752 | 2001 QG_{7} | — | August 16, 2001 | Socorro | LINEAR | EOS | 4.7 km | MPC · JPL |
| 82753 | 2001 QO_{7} | — | August 16, 2001 | Socorro | LINEAR | KOR | 4.2 km | MPC · JPL |
| 82754 | 2001 QP_{7} | — | August 16, 2001 | Socorro | LINEAR | · | 4.6 km | MPC · JPL |
| 82755 | 2001 QX_{7} | — | August 16, 2001 | Socorro | LINEAR | · | 3.8 km | MPC · JPL |
| 82756 | 2001 QC_{8} | — | August 16, 2001 | Socorro | LINEAR | NYS | 2.6 km | MPC · JPL |
| 82757 | 2001 QH_{8} | — | August 16, 2001 | Socorro | LINEAR | · | 3.1 km | MPC · JPL |
| 82758 | 2001 QT_{8} | — | August 16, 2001 | Socorro | LINEAR | HNS | 2.9 km | MPC · JPL |
| 82759 | 2001 QA_{9} | — | August 16, 2001 | Socorro | LINEAR | · | 3.2 km | MPC · JPL |
| 82760 | 2001 QE_{9} | — | August 16, 2001 | Socorro | LINEAR | KOR | 2.9 km | MPC · JPL |
| 82761 | 2001 QL_{9} | — | August 16, 2001 | Socorro | LINEAR | WIT | 2.9 km | MPC · JPL |
| 82762 | 2001 QP_{10} | — | August 16, 2001 | Socorro | LINEAR | NYS | 2.2 km | MPC · JPL |
| 82763 | 2001 QC_{11} | — | August 16, 2001 | Socorro | LINEAR | (5) | 2.9 km | MPC · JPL |
| 82764 | 2001 QD_{11} | — | August 16, 2001 | Socorro | LINEAR | (8737) | 8.8 km | MPC · JPL |
| 82765 | 2001 QP_{11} | — | August 16, 2001 | Socorro | LINEAR | NEM | 4.4 km | MPC · JPL |
| 82766 | 2001 QR_{11} | — | August 16, 2001 | Socorro | LINEAR | EOS | 7.0 km | MPC · JPL |
| 82767 | 2001 QR_{12} | — | August 16, 2001 | Socorro | LINEAR | THM | 8.8 km | MPC · JPL |
| 82768 | 2001 QD_{13} | — | August 16, 2001 | Socorro | LINEAR | THM | 6.5 km | MPC · JPL |
| 82769 | 2001 QH_{14} | — | August 16, 2001 | Socorro | LINEAR | · | 3.5 km | MPC · JPL |
| 82770 | 2001 QJ_{14} | — | August 16, 2001 | Socorro | LINEAR | · | 2.5 km | MPC · JPL |
| 82771 | 2001 QX_{14} | — | August 16, 2001 | Socorro | LINEAR | · | 5.7 km | MPC · JPL |
| 82772 | 2001 QH_{15} | — | August 16, 2001 | Socorro | LINEAR | · | 2.8 km | MPC · JPL |
| 82773 | 2001 QJ_{15} | — | August 16, 2001 | Socorro | LINEAR | · | 7.4 km | MPC · JPL |
| 82774 | 2001 QQ_{15} | — | August 16, 2001 | Socorro | LINEAR | · | 7.8 km | MPC · JPL |
| 82775 | 2001 QZ_{15} | — | August 16, 2001 | Socorro | LINEAR | KOR | 3.0 km | MPC · JPL |
| 82776 | 2001 QB_{17} | — | August 16, 2001 | Socorro | LINEAR | · | 2.3 km | MPC · JPL |
| 82777 | 2001 QF_{17} | — | August 16, 2001 | Socorro | LINEAR | V | 1.6 km | MPC · JPL |
| 82778 | 2001 QP_{17} | — | August 16, 2001 | Socorro | LINEAR | · | 5.9 km | MPC · JPL |
| 82779 | 2001 QU_{17} | — | August 16, 2001 | Socorro | LINEAR | THM | 7.7 km | MPC · JPL |
| 82780 | 2001 QF_{18} | — | August 16, 2001 | Socorro | LINEAR | KOR | 3.3 km | MPC · JPL |
| 82781 | 2001 QX_{18} | — | August 16, 2001 | Socorro | LINEAR | · | 7.4 km | MPC · JPL |
| 82782 | 2001 QY_{18} | — | August 16, 2001 | Socorro | LINEAR | · | 4.3 km | MPC · JPL |
| 82783 | 2001 QE_{20} | — | August 16, 2001 | Socorro | LINEAR | · | 4.5 km | MPC · JPL |
| 82784 | 2001 QK_{20} | — | August 16, 2001 | Socorro | LINEAR | · | 3.3 km | MPC · JPL |
| 82785 | 2001 QL_{21} | — | August 16, 2001 | Socorro | LINEAR | KOR | 3.9 km | MPC · JPL |
| 82786 | 2001 QM_{22} | — | August 16, 2001 | Socorro | LINEAR | · | 9.9 km | MPC · JPL |
| 82787 | 2001 QP_{22} | — | August 16, 2001 | Socorro | LINEAR | · | 4.2 km | MPC · JPL |
| 82788 | 2001 QS_{22} | — | August 16, 2001 | Socorro | LINEAR | NYS · | 5.2 km | MPC · JPL |
| 82789 | 2001 QU_{22} | — | August 16, 2001 | Socorro | LINEAR | MAS | 1.9 km | MPC · JPL |
| 82790 | 2001 QJ_{23} | — | August 16, 2001 | Socorro | LINEAR | GEF | 3.6 km | MPC · JPL |
| 82791 | 2001 QK_{23} | — | August 16, 2001 | Socorro | LINEAR | NYS | 2.0 km | MPC · JPL |
| 82792 | 2001 QM_{23} | — | August 16, 2001 | Socorro | LINEAR | · | 7.0 km | MPC · JPL |
| 82793 | 2001 QH_{24} | — | August 16, 2001 | Socorro | LINEAR | · | 3.6 km | MPC · JPL |
| 82794 | 2001 QN_{25} | — | August 16, 2001 | Socorro | LINEAR | (5) | 3.0 km | MPC · JPL |
| 82795 | 2001 QQ_{25} | — | August 16, 2001 | Socorro | LINEAR | MAR | 2.9 km | MPC · JPL |
| 82796 | 2001 QX_{25} | — | August 16, 2001 | Socorro | LINEAR | · | 5.8 km | MPC · JPL |
| 82797 | 2001 QY_{25} | — | August 16, 2001 | Socorro | LINEAR | BRU | 6.3 km | MPC · JPL |
| 82798 | 2001 QB_{26} | — | August 16, 2001 | Socorro | LINEAR | · | 5.4 km | MPC · JPL |
| 82799 | 2001 QF_{26} | — | August 16, 2001 | Socorro | LINEAR | HOF | 4.6 km | MPC · JPL |
| 82800 | 2001 QH_{26} | — | August 16, 2001 | Socorro | LINEAR | NYS | 3.5 km | MPC · JPL |

== 82801–82900 ==
back to top

| Designation | | | Discovery | | | Properties | | Ref |
| Permanent | Provisional | Named after | Date | Site | Discoverer(s) | Category | Diam. | Ref |
|---|---|---|---|---|---|---|---|---|
| 82801 | 2001 QF_{27} | — | August 16, 2001 | Socorro | LINEAR | · | 6.5 km | MPC · JPL |
| 82802 | 2001 QM_{27} | — | August 16, 2001 | Socorro | LINEAR | · | 3.4 km | MPC · JPL |
| 82803 | 2001 QO_{28} | — | August 16, 2001 | Socorro | LINEAR | · | 5.3 km | MPC · JPL |
| 82804 | 2001 QJ_{30} | — | August 16, 2001 | Socorro | LINEAR | BRA | 5.4 km | MPC · JPL |
| 82805 | 2001 QO_{30} | — | August 16, 2001 | Socorro | LINEAR | · | 14 km | MPC · JPL |
| 82806 | 2001 QO_{31} | — | August 16, 2001 | Socorro | LINEAR | · | 2.5 km | MPC · JPL |
| 82807 | 2001 QK_{32} | — | August 17, 2001 | Socorro | LINEAR | LUT | 8.0 km | MPC · JPL |
| 82808 | 2001 QD_{33} | — | August 17, 2001 | Palomar | NEAT | KOR | 2.8 km | MPC · JPL |
| 82809 | 2001 QK_{33} | — | August 17, 2001 | Ondřejov | P. Kušnirák, U. Babiaková | · | 7.0 km | MPC · JPL |
| 82810 | 2001 QV_{34} | — | August 16, 2001 | Socorro | LINEAR | GEF | 3.0 km | MPC · JPL |
| 82811 | 2001 QZ_{34} | — | August 16, 2001 | Socorro | LINEAR | · | 3.9 km | MPC · JPL |
| 82812 | 2001 QD_{35} | — | August 16, 2001 | Socorro | LINEAR | · | 3.7 km | MPC · JPL |
| 82813 | 2001 QJ_{35} | — | August 16, 2001 | Socorro | LINEAR | MAR | 3.0 km | MPC · JPL |
| 82814 | 2001 QQ_{36} | — | August 16, 2001 | Socorro | LINEAR | · | 8.6 km | MPC · JPL |
| 82815 | 2001 QO_{37} | — | August 16, 2001 | Socorro | LINEAR | (5) | 2.0 km | MPC · JPL |
| 82816 | 2001 QR_{37} | — | August 16, 2001 | Socorro | LINEAR | · | 2.6 km | MPC · JPL |
| 82817 | 2001 QV_{37} | — | August 16, 2001 | Socorro | LINEAR | · | 4.2 km | MPC · JPL |
| 82818 | 2001 QM_{38} | — | August 16, 2001 | Socorro | LINEAR | · | 2.7 km | MPC · JPL |
| 82819 | 2001 QO_{38} | — | August 16, 2001 | Socorro | LINEAR | · | 2.9 km | MPC · JPL |
| 82820 | 2001 QT_{38} | — | August 16, 2001 | Socorro | LINEAR | · | 4.1 km | MPC · JPL |
| 82821 | 2001 QH_{39} | — | August 16, 2001 | Socorro | LINEAR | · | 2.7 km | MPC · JPL |
| 82822 | 2001 QW_{40} | — | August 16, 2001 | Socorro | LINEAR | · | 4.1 km | MPC · JPL |
| 82823 | 2001 QF_{41} | — | August 16, 2001 | Socorro | LINEAR | AEO | 2.7 km | MPC · JPL |
| 82824 | 2001 QM_{43} | — | August 16, 2001 | Socorro | LINEAR | EUN | 3.2 km | MPC · JPL |
| 82825 | 2001 QN_{43} | — | August 16, 2001 | Socorro | LINEAR | · | 2.2 km | MPC · JPL |
| 82826 | 2001 QA_{44} | — | August 16, 2001 | Socorro | LINEAR | V | 1.3 km | MPC · JPL |
| 82827 | 2001 QJ_{44} | — | August 16, 2001 | Socorro | LINEAR | · | 4.4 km | MPC · JPL |
| 82828 | 2001 QB_{45} | — | August 16, 2001 | Socorro | LINEAR | EOS | 3.5 km | MPC · JPL |
| 82829 | 2001 QJ_{45} | — | August 16, 2001 | Socorro | LINEAR | · | 2.6 km | MPC · JPL |
| 82830 | 2001 QS_{45} | — | August 16, 2001 | Socorro | LINEAR | · | 4.8 km | MPC · JPL |
| 82831 | 2001 QU_{45} | — | August 16, 2001 | Socorro | LINEAR | · | 1.5 km | MPC · JPL |
| 82832 | 2001 QE_{46} | — | August 16, 2001 | Socorro | LINEAR | GEF | 3.2 km | MPC · JPL |
| 82833 | 2001 QF_{46} | — | August 16, 2001 | Socorro | LINEAR | EOS | 4.0 km | MPC · JPL |
| 82834 | 2001 QL_{46} | — | August 16, 2001 | Socorro | LINEAR | PAD | 3.2 km | MPC · JPL |
| 82835 | 2001 QP_{46} | — | August 16, 2001 | Socorro | LINEAR | · | 5.7 km | MPC · JPL |
| 82836 | 2001 QE_{47} | — | August 16, 2001 | Socorro | LINEAR | · | 2.1 km | MPC · JPL |
| 82837 | 2001 QB_{48} | — | August 16, 2001 | Socorro | LINEAR | HNS | 3.0 km | MPC · JPL |
| 82838 | 2001 QU_{48} | — | August 16, 2001 | Socorro | LINEAR | NYS | 2.0 km | MPC · JPL |
| 82839 | 2001 QM_{49} | — | August 16, 2001 | Socorro | LINEAR | EOS | 5.0 km | MPC · JPL |
| 82840 | 2001 QE_{50} | — | August 16, 2001 | Socorro | LINEAR | AST | 4.3 km | MPC · JPL |
| 82841 | 2001 QH_{50} | — | August 16, 2001 | Socorro | LINEAR | KOR | 2.9 km | MPC · JPL |
| 82842 | 2001 QK_{50} | — | August 16, 2001 | Socorro | LINEAR | · | 5.9 km | MPC · JPL |
| 82843 | 2001 QO_{50} | — | August 16, 2001 | Socorro | LINEAR | KOR | 3.4 km | MPC · JPL |
| 82844 | 2001 QQ_{50} | — | August 16, 2001 | Socorro | LINEAR | · | 4.4 km | MPC · JPL |
| 82845 | 2001 QR_{50} | — | August 16, 2001 | Socorro | LINEAR | · | 6.5 km | MPC · JPL |
| 82846 | 2001 QW_{50} | — | August 16, 2001 | Socorro | LINEAR | KOR | 3.2 km | MPC · JPL |
| 82847 | 2001 QJ_{52} | — | August 16, 2001 | Socorro | LINEAR | KOR | 3.1 km | MPC · JPL |
| 82848 | 2001 QM_{52} | — | August 16, 2001 | Socorro | LINEAR | · | 3.6 km | MPC · JPL |
| 82849 | 2001 QN_{52} | — | August 16, 2001 | Socorro | LINEAR | · | 3.5 km | MPC · JPL |
| 82850 | 2001 QW_{52} | — | August 16, 2001 | Socorro | LINEAR | · | 3.1 km | MPC · JPL |
| 82851 | 2001 QP_{53} | — | August 16, 2001 | Socorro | LINEAR | · | 4.0 km | MPC · JPL |
| 82852 | 2001 QT_{53} | — | August 16, 2001 | Socorro | LINEAR | · | 4.3 km | MPC · JPL |
| 82853 | 2001 QD_{55} | — | August 16, 2001 | Socorro | LINEAR | THM | 7.9 km | MPC · JPL |
| 82854 | 2001 QC_{56} | — | August 16, 2001 | Socorro | LINEAR | MAR | 1.7 km | MPC · JPL |
| 82855 | 2001 QU_{56} | — | August 16, 2001 | Socorro | LINEAR | · | 3.6 km | MPC · JPL |
| 82856 | 2001 QA_{57} | — | August 16, 2001 | Socorro | LINEAR | · | 4.8 km | MPC · JPL |
| 82857 | 2001 QG_{57} | — | August 16, 2001 | Socorro | LINEAR | · | 1.7 km | MPC · JPL |
| 82858 | 2001 QY_{57} | — | August 16, 2001 | Socorro | LINEAR | · | 4.1 km | MPC · JPL |
| 82859 | 2001 QA_{58} | — | August 16, 2001 | Socorro | LINEAR | · | 5.3 km | MPC · JPL |
| 82860 | 2001 QE_{58} | — | August 16, 2001 | Socorro | LINEAR | · | 2.4 km | MPC · JPL |
| 82861 | 2001 QD_{59} | — | August 17, 2001 | Socorro | LINEAR | EUN | 3.0 km | MPC · JPL |
| 82862 | 2001 QP_{60} | — | August 18, 2001 | Socorro | LINEAR | slow · | 7.6 km | MPC · JPL |
| 82863 | 2001 QO_{61} | — | August 16, 2001 | Socorro | LINEAR | EOS | 4.4 km | MPC · JPL |
| 82864 | 2001 QS_{62} | — | August 16, 2001 | Socorro | LINEAR | · | 3.0 km | MPC · JPL |
| 82865 | 2001 QU_{62} | — | August 16, 2001 | Socorro | LINEAR | · | 4.8 km | MPC · JPL |
| 82866 | 2001 QG_{63} | — | August 16, 2001 | Socorro | LINEAR | MAR | 2.2 km | MPC · JPL |
| 82867 | 2001 QS_{63} | — | August 16, 2001 | Socorro | LINEAR | KOR | 3.5 km | MPC · JPL |
| 82868 | 2001 QT_{63} | — | August 16, 2001 | Socorro | LINEAR | · | 7.5 km | MPC · JPL |
| 82869 | 2001 QV_{63} | — | August 16, 2001 | Socorro | LINEAR | KOR | 3.9 km | MPC · JPL |
| 82870 | 2001 QC_{64} | — | August 16, 2001 | Socorro | LINEAR | EOS | 4.2 km | MPC · JPL |
| 82871 | 2001 QA_{66} | — | August 17, 2001 | Socorro | LINEAR | EOS | 4.5 km | MPC · JPL |
| 82872 | 2001 QC_{66} | — | August 17, 2001 | Socorro | LINEAR | MAR | 2.9 km | MPC · JPL |
| 82873 | 2001 QF_{66} | — | August 17, 2001 | Socorro | LINEAR | · | 2.9 km | MPC · JPL |
| 82874 | 2001 QU_{66} | — | August 17, 2001 | Socorro | LINEAR | · | 2.0 km | MPC · JPL |
| 82875 | 2001 QB_{67} | — | August 18, 2001 | Socorro | LINEAR | DOR | 7.0 km | MPC · JPL |
| 82876 | 2001 QR_{67} | — | August 19, 2001 | Socorro | LINEAR | · | 4.3 km | MPC · JPL |
| 82877 | 2001 QZ_{67} | — | August 20, 2001 | Nashville | Clingan, R. | · | 2.8 km | MPC · JPL |
| 82878 | 2001 QJ_{69} | — | August 17, 2001 | Socorro | LINEAR | · | 7.0 km | MPC · JPL |
| 82879 | 2001 QE_{70} | — | August 17, 2001 | Socorro | LINEAR | · | 3.0 km | MPC · JPL |
| 82880 | 2001 QN_{70} | — | August 17, 2001 | Socorro | LINEAR | · | 9.6 km | MPC · JPL |
| 82881 | 2001 QZ_{70} | — | August 17, 2001 | Socorro | LINEAR | EUN | 2.7 km | MPC · JPL |
| 82882 | 2001 QG_{71} | — | August 16, 2001 | Palomar | NEAT | · | 14 km | MPC · JPL |
| 82883 | 2001 QJ_{73} | — | August 19, 2001 | Socorro | LINEAR | · | 7.8 km | MPC · JPL |
| 82884 | 2001 QQ_{75} | — | August 16, 2001 | Socorro | LINEAR | GEF | 2.8 km | MPC · JPL |
| 82885 | 2001 QC_{77} | — | August 16, 2001 | Socorro | LINEAR | · | 4.1 km | MPC · JPL |
| 82886 | 2001 QC_{81} | — | August 17, 2001 | Socorro | LINEAR | · | 4.0 km | MPC · JPL |
| 82887 | 2001 QK_{81} | — | August 17, 2001 | Socorro | LINEAR | · | 2.6 km | MPC · JPL |
| 82888 | 2001 QU_{81} | — | August 17, 2001 | Socorro | LINEAR | EOS | 6.4 km | MPC · JPL |
| 82889 | 2001 QW_{83} | — | August 17, 2001 | Socorro | LINEAR | · | 4.1 km | MPC · JPL |
| 82890 | 2001 QZ_{83} | — | August 17, 2001 | Socorro | LINEAR | · | 8.4 km | MPC · JPL |
| 82891 | 2001 QC_{84} | — | August 17, 2001 | Socorro | LINEAR | · | 5.7 km | MPC · JPL |
| 82892 | 2001 QN_{86} | — | August 16, 2001 | Palomar | NEAT | · | 2.8 km | MPC · JPL |
| 82893 | 2001 QR_{86} | — | August 16, 2001 | Palomar | NEAT | JUN | 2.0 km | MPC · JPL |
| 82894 | 2001 QZ_{86} | — | August 17, 2001 | Palomar | NEAT | · | 8.4 km | MPC · JPL |
| 82895 | 2001 QG_{87} | — | August 17, 2001 | Palomar | NEAT | HNS | 3.0 km | MPC · JPL |
| 82896 Vaubaillon | 2001 QV_{87} | Vaubaillon | August 22, 2001 | Pic du Midi | Pic du Midi | · | 3.3 km | MPC · JPL |
| 82897 | 2001 QM_{89} | — | August 16, 2001 | Palomar | NEAT | · | 5.7 km | MPC · JPL |
| 82898 | 2001 QT_{89} | — | August 16, 2001 | Palomar | NEAT | PHO | 2.0 km | MPC · JPL |
| 82899 | 2001 QS_{90} | — | August 22, 2001 | Socorro | LINEAR | · | 6.7 km | MPC · JPL |
| 82900 | 2001 QX_{94} | — | August 23, 2001 | Desert Eagle | W. K. Y. Yeung | AGN | 3.0 km | MPC · JPL |

== 82901–83000 ==
back to top

| Designation | | | Discovery | | | Properties | | Ref |
| Permanent | Provisional | Named after | Date | Site | Discoverer(s) | Category | Diam. | Ref |
|---|---|---|---|---|---|---|---|---|
| 82901 | 2001 QZ_{94} | — | August 23, 2001 | Desert Eagle | W. K. Y. Yeung | WAT | 5.4 km | MPC · JPL |
| 82902 | 2001 QV_{96} | — | August 16, 2001 | Socorro | LINEAR | · | 2.6 km | MPC · JPL |
| 82903 | 2001 QD_{97} | — | August 17, 2001 | Socorro | LINEAR | · | 5.1 km | MPC · JPL |
| 82904 | 2001 QO_{98} | — | August 19, 2001 | Socorro | LINEAR | (5) | 2.5 km | MPC · JPL |
| 82905 | 2001 QS_{98} | — | August 20, 2001 | Socorro | LINEAR | EOS | 6.0 km | MPC · JPL |
| 82906 | 2001 QJ_{99} | — | August 22, 2001 | Socorro | LINEAR | EMA | 12 km | MPC · JPL |
| 82907 | 2001 QC_{100} | — | August 18, 2001 | Palomar | NEAT | · | 1.8 km | MPC · JPL |
| 82908 | 2001 QU_{100} | — | August 19, 2001 | Ondřejov | P. Kušnirák, U. Babiaková | · | 2.4 km | MPC · JPL |
| 82909 | 2001 QV_{100} | — | August 19, 2001 | Haleakala | NEAT | · | 3.1 km | MPC · JPL |
| 82910 | 2001 QX_{100} | — | August 19, 2001 | Haleakala | NEAT | GEF | 2.7 km | MPC · JPL |
| 82911 | 2001 QH_{101} | — | August 18, 2001 | Socorro | LINEAR | HOF | 5.8 km | MPC · JPL |
| 82912 | 2001 QU_{102} | — | August 19, 2001 | Socorro | LINEAR | · | 3.5 km | MPC · JPL |
| 82913 | 2001 QN_{103} | — | August 19, 2001 | Socorro | LINEAR | · | 3.7 km | MPC · JPL |
| 82914 | 2001 QS_{103} | — | August 19, 2001 | Socorro | LINEAR | EUN | 3.0 km | MPC · JPL |
| 82915 | 2001 QA_{104} | — | August 20, 2001 | Socorro | LINEAR | slow | 7.6 km | MPC · JPL |
| 82916 | 2001 QH_{104} | — | August 20, 2001 | Socorro | LINEAR | · | 2.3 km | MPC · JPL |
| 82917 | 2001 QK_{104} | — | August 20, 2001 | Socorro | LINEAR | · | 2.6 km | MPC · JPL |
| 82918 | 2001 QR_{104} | — | August 22, 2001 | Socorro | LINEAR | · | 3.7 km | MPC · JPL |
| 82919 | 2001 QD_{106} | — | August 18, 2001 | Anderson Mesa | LONEOS | · | 5.1 km | MPC · JPL |
| 82920 | 2001 QF_{106} | — | August 18, 2001 | Anderson Mesa | LONEOS | · | 4.8 km | MPC · JPL |
| 82921 | 2001 QU_{107} | — | August 18, 2001 | Anderson Mesa | LONEOS | · | 3.7 km | MPC · JPL |
| 82922 | 2001 QZ_{107} | — | August 23, 2001 | Anderson Mesa | LONEOS | THM | 4.0 km | MPC · JPL |
| 82923 | 2001 QN_{109} | — | August 20, 2001 | Haleakala | NEAT | EOS | 4.2 km | MPC · JPL |
| 82924 | 2001 QD_{110} | — | August 24, 2001 | Palomar | NEAT | · | 2.3 km | MPC · JPL |
| 82925 | 2001 QG_{110} | — | August 24, 2001 | Palomar | NEAT | · | 4.5 km | MPC · JPL |
| 82926 Jacquey | 2001 QH_{110} | Jacquey | August 25, 2001 | Pises | J.-M. Lopez, J. H. Blanc | · | 4.1 km | MPC · JPL |
| 82927 Ferrucci | 2001 QK_{110} | Ferrucci | August 25, 2001 | San Marcello | L. Tesi, A. Boattini | · | 5.7 km | MPC · JPL |
| 82928 | 2001 QM_{110} | — | August 19, 2001 | Ondřejov | P. Kušnirák, P. Pravec | WIT | 1.9 km | MPC · JPL |
| 82929 | 2001 QN_{110} | — | August 20, 2001 | Ondřejov | P. Pravec, P. Kušnirák | EOS | 3.8 km | MPC · JPL |
| 82930 | 2001 QZ_{110} | — | August 24, 2001 | Ondřejov | P. Kušnirák, P. Pravec | · | 3.7 km | MPC · JPL |
| 82931 | 2001 QE_{112} | — | August 25, 2001 | Socorro | LINEAR | · | 3.9 km | MPC · JPL |
| 82932 | 2001 QS_{112} | — | August 25, 2001 | Socorro | LINEAR | · | 3.8 km | MPC · JPL |
| 82933 | 2001 QU_{112} | — | August 25, 2001 | Socorro | LINEAR | EOS | 6.5 km | MPC · JPL |
| 82934 | 2001 QX_{112} | — | August 25, 2001 | Socorro | LINEAR | EOS | 5.4 km | MPC · JPL |
| 82935 | 2001 QK_{113} | — | August 25, 2001 | Socorro | LINEAR | · | 5.2 km | MPC · JPL |
| 82936 | 2001 QQ_{113} | — | August 25, 2001 | Desert Eagle | W. K. Y. Yeung | EOS | 4.7 km | MPC · JPL |
| 82937 Lesicki | 2001 QW_{113} | Lesicki | August 26, 2001 | Ondřejov | P. Pravec, P. Kušnirák | · | 7.0 km | MPC · JPL |
| 82938 | 2001 QB_{114} | — | August 17, 2001 | Socorro | LINEAR | · | 3.1 km | MPC · JPL |
| 82939 | 2001 QY_{114} | — | August 17, 2001 | Socorro | LINEAR | EOS | 4.9 km | MPC · JPL |
| 82940 | 2001 QZ_{115} | — | August 17, 2001 | Socorro | LINEAR | · | 2.9 km | MPC · JPL |
| 82941 | 2001 QC_{116} | — | August 17, 2001 | Socorro | LINEAR | · | 2.6 km | MPC · JPL |
| 82942 | 2001 QH_{116} | — | August 17, 2001 | Socorro | LINEAR | GEF | 3.4 km | MPC · JPL |
| 82943 | 2001 QG_{117} | — | August 17, 2001 | Socorro | LINEAR | EOS | 6.4 km | MPC · JPL |
| 82944 | 2001 QJ_{117} | — | August 17, 2001 | Socorro | LINEAR | EUN | 3.4 km | MPC · JPL |
| 82945 | 2001 QN_{117} | — | August 17, 2001 | Socorro | LINEAR | EOS | 4.6 km | MPC · JPL |
| 82946 | 2001 QN_{119} | — | August 18, 2001 | Socorro | LINEAR | EOS | 4.6 km | MPC · JPL |
| 82947 | 2001 QV_{121} | — | August 19, 2001 | Socorro | LINEAR | · | 3.5 km | MPC · JPL |
| 82948 | 2001 QD_{122} | — | August 19, 2001 | Socorro | LINEAR | NYS | 1.9 km | MPC · JPL |
| 82949 | 2001 QE_{124} | — | August 19, 2001 | Socorro | LINEAR | HYG | 5.2 km | MPC · JPL |
| 82950 | 2001 QB_{125} | — | August 19, 2001 | Socorro | LINEAR | PAD | 4.8 km | MPC · JPL |
| 82951 | 2001 QS_{125} | — | August 19, 2001 | Socorro | LINEAR | EOS | 3.8 km | MPC · JPL |
| 82952 | 2001 QC_{126} | — | August 19, 2001 | Socorro | LINEAR | · | 4.9 km | MPC · JPL |
| 82953 | 2001 QS_{126} | — | August 20, 2001 | Socorro | LINEAR | · | 9.2 km | MPC · JPL |
| 82954 | 2001 QW_{126} | — | August 20, 2001 | Socorro | LINEAR | · | 7.1 km | MPC · JPL |
| 82955 | 2001 QB_{127} | — | August 20, 2001 | Socorro | LINEAR | BRG | 3.5 km | MPC · JPL |
| 82956 | 2001 QT_{127} | — | August 20, 2001 | Socorro | LINEAR | MAR | 2.4 km | MPC · JPL |
| 82957 | 2001 QU_{127} | — | August 20, 2001 | Socorro | LINEAR | · | 4.8 km | MPC · JPL |
| 82958 | 2001 QP_{128} | — | August 20, 2001 | Socorro | LINEAR | (1118) | 8.5 km | MPC · JPL |
| 82959 | 2001 QK_{129} | — | August 20, 2001 | Socorro | LINEAR | · | 9.7 km | MPC · JPL |
| 82960 | 2001 QN_{129} | — | August 20, 2001 | Socorro | LINEAR | · | 2.8 km | MPC · JPL |
| 82961 | 2001 QO_{129} | — | August 20, 2001 | Socorro | LINEAR | VER | 6.9 km | MPC · JPL |
| 82962 | 2001 QH_{130} | — | August 20, 2001 | Socorro | LINEAR | · | 2.9 km | MPC · JPL |
| 82963 | 2001 QT_{130} | — | August 20, 2001 | Socorro | LINEAR | EOS | 4.3 km | MPC · JPL |
| 82964 | 2001 QL_{131} | — | August 20, 2001 | Socorro | LINEAR | EOS | 5.1 km | MPC · JPL |
| 82965 | 2001 QU_{131} | — | August 20, 2001 | Socorro | LINEAR | · | 4.6 km | MPC · JPL |
| 82966 | 2001 QD_{132} | — | August 20, 2001 | Socorro | LINEAR | · | 3.5 km | MPC · JPL |
| 82967 | 2001 QV_{132} | — | August 20, 2001 | Socorro | LINEAR | EOS | 5.6 km | MPC · JPL |
| 82968 | 2001 QF_{133} | — | August 21, 2001 | Socorro | LINEAR | EUN | 2.2 km | MPC · JPL |
| 82969 | 2001 QQ_{133} | — | August 21, 2001 | Socorro | LINEAR | · | 2.4 km | MPC · JPL |
| 82970 | 2001 QY_{134} | — | August 22, 2001 | Socorro | LINEAR | DOR | 7.4 km | MPC · JPL |
| 82971 | 2001 QD_{135} | — | August 22, 2001 | Socorro | LINEAR | · | 7.3 km | MPC · JPL |
| 82972 | 2001 QR_{136} | — | August 22, 2001 | Socorro | LINEAR | MAR | 3.3 km | MPC · JPL |
| 82973 | 2001 QA_{137} | — | August 22, 2001 | Socorro | LINEAR | EUN | 3.3 km | MPC · JPL |
| 82974 | 2001 QN_{138} | — | August 22, 2001 | Socorro | LINEAR | · | 4.3 km | MPC · JPL |
| 82975 | 2001 QQ_{139} | — | August 22, 2001 | Socorro | LINEAR | · | 5.2 km | MPC · JPL |
| 82976 | 2001 QK_{140} | — | August 22, 2001 | Socorro | LINEAR | · | 3.0 km | MPC · JPL |
| 82977 | 2001 QS_{140} | — | August 22, 2001 | Socorro | LINEAR | ADE | 5.4 km | MPC · JPL |
| 82978 | 2001 QT_{141} | — | August 24, 2001 | Socorro | LINEAR | MAS | 1.6 km | MPC · JPL |
| 82979 | 2001 QU_{141} | — | August 24, 2001 | Socorro | LINEAR | · | 6.6 km | MPC · JPL |
| 82980 | 2001 QO_{143} | — | August 21, 2001 | Kitt Peak | Spacewatch | · | 3.4 km | MPC · JPL |
| 82981 | 2001 QA_{144} | — | August 21, 2001 | Kitt Peak | Spacewatch | · | 4.9 km | MPC · JPL |
| 82982 | 2001 QC_{144} | — | August 21, 2001 | Kitt Peak | Spacewatch | · | 7.2 km | MPC · JPL |
| 82983 | 2001 QE_{144} | — | August 21, 2001 | Kitt Peak | Spacewatch | · | 6.0 km | MPC · JPL |
| 82984 | 2001 QV_{146} | — | August 20, 2001 | Palomar | NEAT | · | 6.9 km | MPC · JPL |
| 82985 | 2001 QC_{147} | — | August 20, 2001 | Palomar | NEAT | · | 4.6 km | MPC · JPL |
| 82986 | 2001 QK_{147} | — | August 20, 2001 | Palomar | NEAT | · | 6.7 km | MPC · JPL |
| 82987 | 2001 QR_{147} | — | August 20, 2001 | Palomar | NEAT | · | 2.8 km | MPC · JPL |
| 82988 | 2001 QC_{148} | — | August 20, 2001 | Palomar | NEAT | · | 4.6 km | MPC · JPL |
| 82989 | 2001 QM_{148} | — | August 20, 2001 | Haleakala | NEAT | TEL | 3.2 km | MPC · JPL |
| 82990 | 2001 QK_{152} | — | August 25, 2001 | Desert Eagle | W. K. Y. Yeung | KOR | 4.5 km | MPC · JPL |
| 82991 | 2001 QO_{153} | — | August 27, 2001 | Socorro | LINEAR | · | 6.3 km | MPC · JPL |
| 82992 | 2001 QN_{154} | — | August 27, 2001 | Goodricke-Pigott | R. A. Tucker | PAD | 7.1 km | MPC · JPL |
| 82993 | 2001 QO_{154} | — | August 28, 2001 | Desert Eagle | W. K. Y. Yeung | · | 7.7 km | MPC · JPL |
| 82994 | 2001 QP_{154} | — | August 30, 2001 | Desert Eagle | W. K. Y. Yeung | · | 4.9 km | MPC · JPL |
| 82995 | 2001 QJ_{155} | — | August 23, 2001 | Anderson Mesa | LONEOS | · | 6.3 km | MPC · JPL |
| 82996 | 2001 QV_{156} | — | August 23, 2001 | Anderson Mesa | LONEOS | · | 2.3 km | MPC · JPL |
| 82997 | 2001 QW_{156} | — | August 23, 2001 | Anderson Mesa | LONEOS | · | 2.1 km | MPC · JPL |
| 82998 | 2001 QJ_{157} | — | August 23, 2001 | Anderson Mesa | LONEOS | GEF | 2.7 km | MPC · JPL |
| 82999 | 2001 QZ_{158} | — | August 23, 2001 | Anderson Mesa | LONEOS | · | 2.6 km | MPC · JPL |
| 83000 | 2001 QG_{159} | — | August 23, 2001 | Anderson Mesa | LONEOS | · | 7.5 km | MPC · JPL |

back to top

== See also ==
- Meanings of minor-planet names: 82001–83000
