= List of people from Poznań =

The following is a list of people from Poznań in Poland.

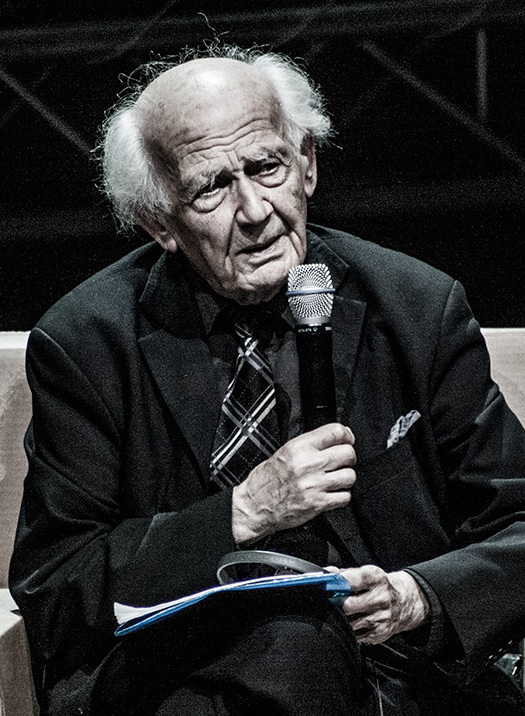
Zygmunt Bauman

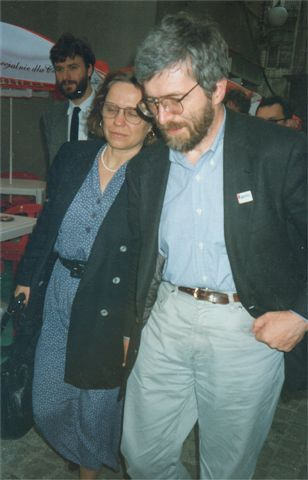
Stanisław Barańczak

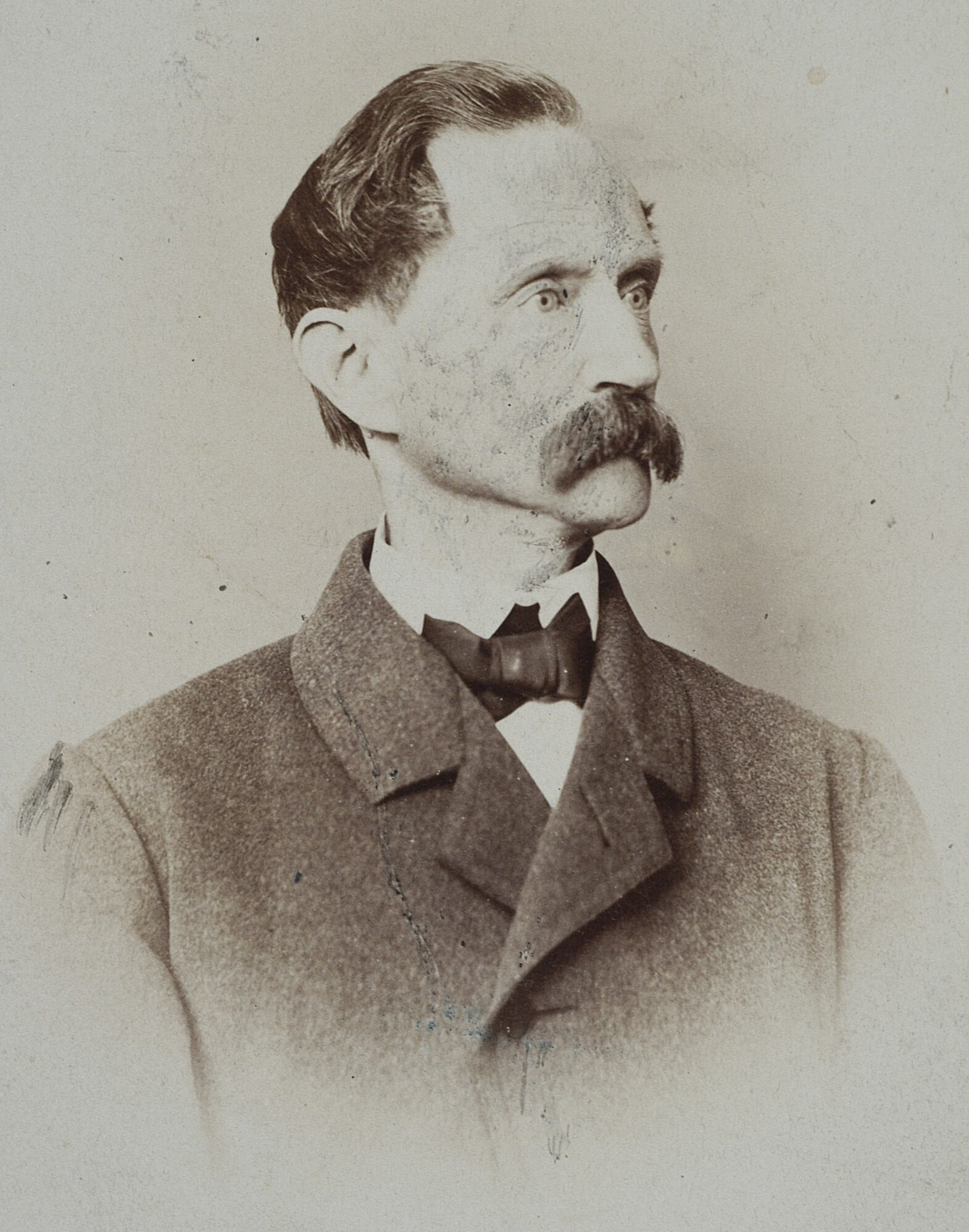
Hipolit Cegielski

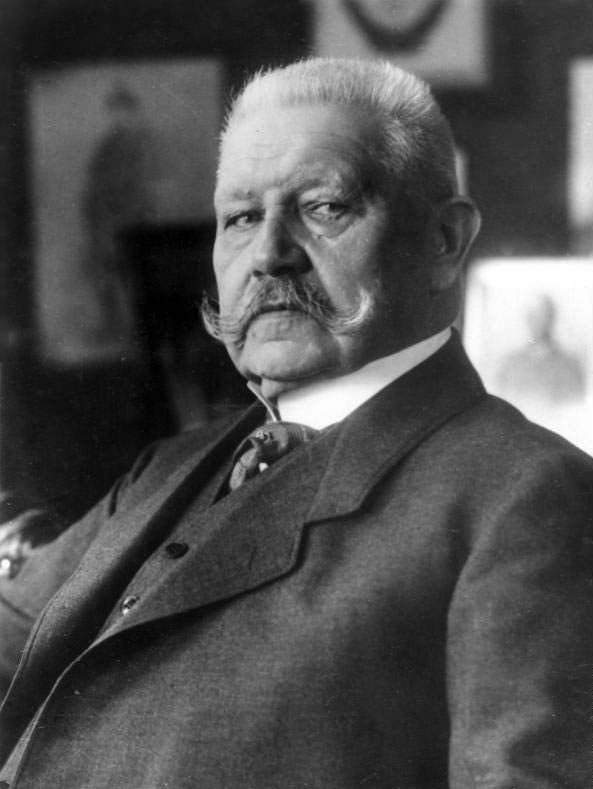
Paul von Hindenburg

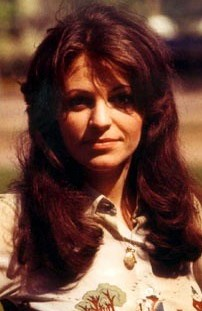
Anna Jantar

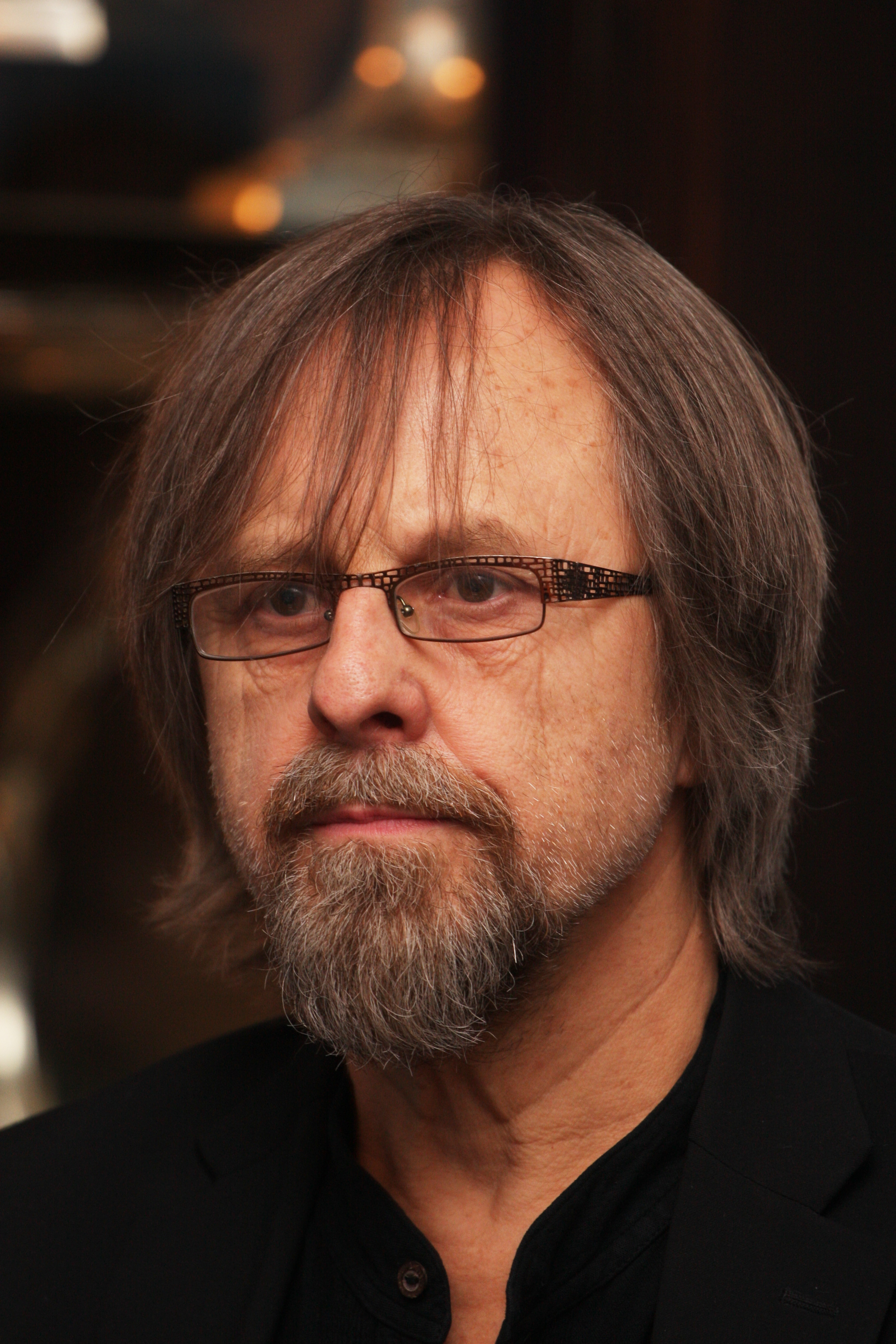
Jan A. P. Kaczmarek

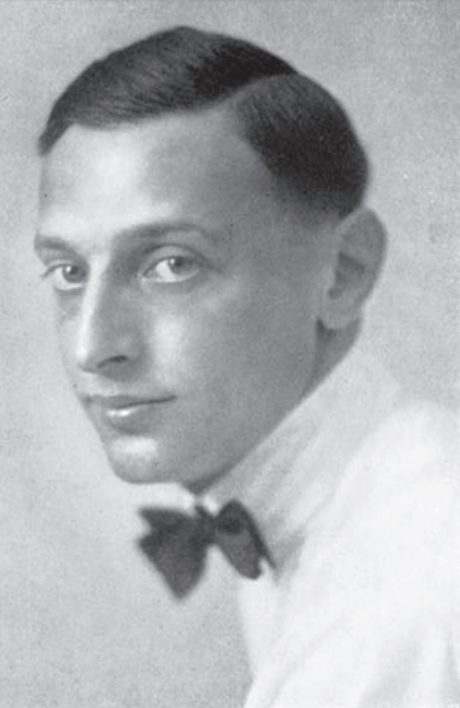
Ernst Kantorowicz

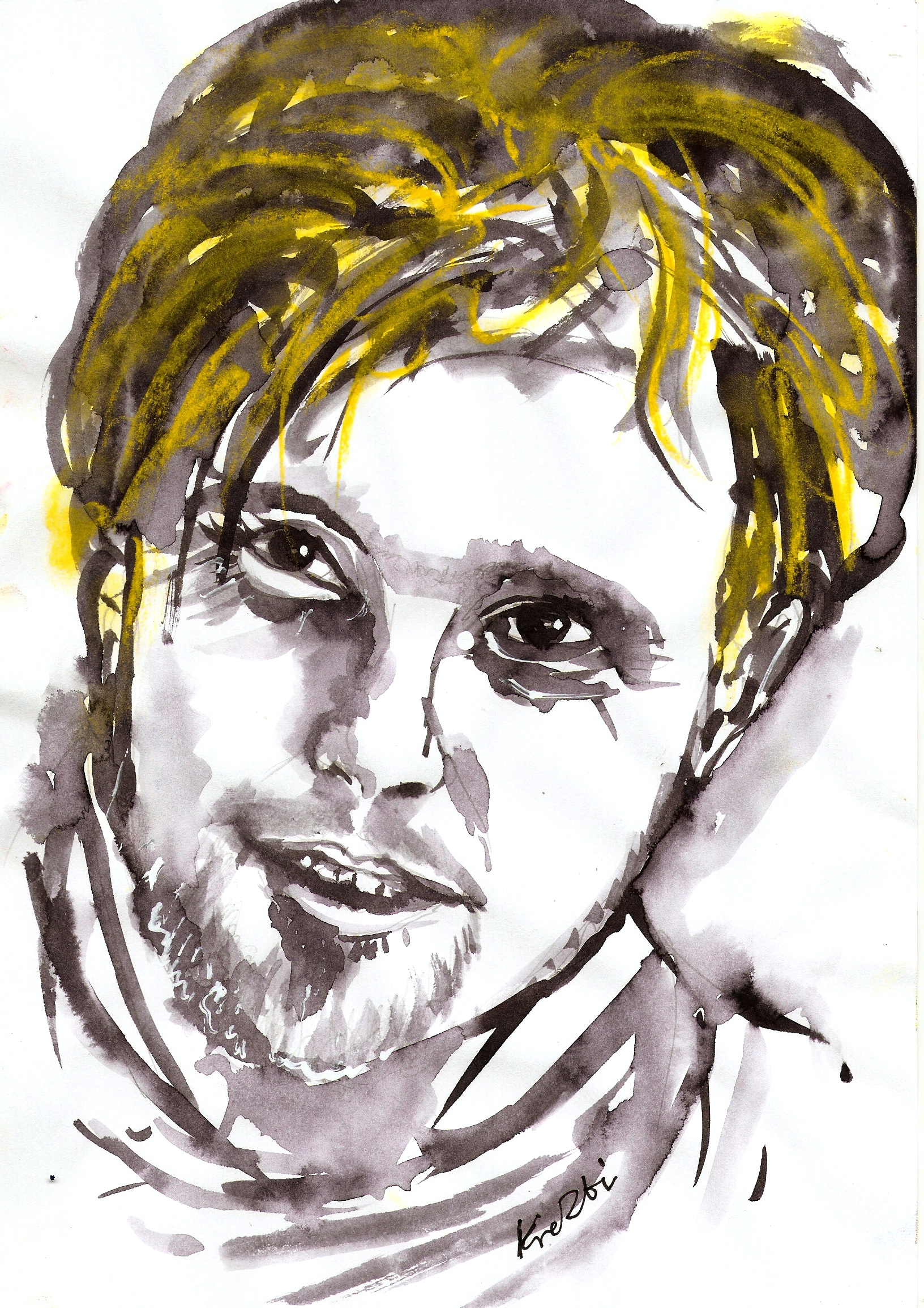
Krzysztof Komeda

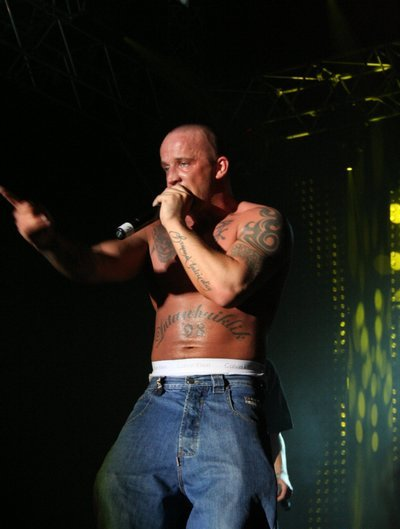
Peja

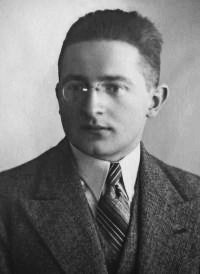
Marian Rejewski

- Anna Anderson (1896–1984), pretender of Grand Duchess Anastasia of Russia
- Ryszard "Peja" Andrzejewski (born 1976), rapper
- Lothar von Arnauld de la Perière (1886–1941), German U-boat commander
- Isidor Ascheim (1891–1968), painter and printmaker
- Hanna Banaszak (born 1957), singer, poet
- Stanisław Barańczak (1946–2014), poet
- Herbert Baum (1912–1942) resistance fighter
- Zygmunt Bauman (1925–2017), sociologist
- Hayim ben Bezalel (died 1588), rabbi
- Judah Loew ben Bezalel (1512 or 1526–1609), important Talmudic scholar, Jewish mystic, and philosopher
- Robert Buech (1870–1949), politician
- Katarzyna Bujakiewicz (born 1972), actress
- Heinrich Caro (1834–1910), chemist
- Hipolit Cegielski (1815–1868), businessman
- Dezydery Chłapowski (1788–1848), general
- August Cieszkowski (1814–1894), philosopher
- Antoni Czubiński (1928–2003), historian
- Leopold Damrosch (1832–1885), conductor
- Kurt Demmler (1943–2009), songwriter; accused of sexual abuse he hanged himself in his jail cell
- Ludwig Dessoir, (1810–1874), actor
- Tomasz Dietl (born 1950), physicist
- Franciszek Dobrowolski (1830–1896), theater director
- Małgorzata Dydek (1974–2011), basketball player
- Tytus Działyński (1796–1861), political activist
- Akiva Eiger (1761–1837), Rabbi of Poznań (1815–1837)
- Ewaryst Estkowski (1820–1856), teacher
- Gerard Ettinger (1909–2002), designer and manufacturer of leather goods.
- Krystyna Feldman (1916–2007), actress
- Wojciech Fibak (born 1952), tennis player
- Gerhard Flesch (1909–1948), German Nazi Gestapo and SS officer executed for war crimes
- Fredrak Fraske (1872–1973), the last surviving United States veteran of the Indian Wars
- Johannes Gad (1842–1926), neurophysiologist
- Jean Gebser (1905–1973), human consciousness scientist
- Eduard Gerhard (1795–1867), archaeologist.
- Arkadiusz Głowacki (born 1979), footballer
- Michał Goliński (born 1981), footballer
- Friedrich Goltz (1834–1902), physiologist
- Konstanty Gorski (1859–1924), composer and violinist
- Kasper Goski (died 1576), Mayor of Poznań, astrologer and medical doctor
- Heinrich Graetz (1817–1891) historian, wrote a history of the Jewish people from a Jewish perspective.
- Paul von Hindenburg (1847–1934), Field Marshal and President of the Weimar Republic
- Dariusz Hoffmann, an educator, entertainer and YouTuber
- Joanna Hoffmann-Dietrich (born 1968), artist and academic
- Piotr Hofmański (born 1956), jurist and former International Criminal Court President
- Samuel Holdheim (1806–1860), a German rabbi and author.
- Maksymilian Jackowski (1815–1905), activist
- Anna Jantar (1950–1980), a popular Polish singer, who perished in a plane crash.
- Alfred Jodl (1890–1946), German WW2 military commander executed for war crimes
- John Jonston (1603–1675), naturalist and physician
- Jan A.P. Kaczmarek (born 1954), composer
- Maria and Bogdan Kalinowski, (1945–2020) & (1939–2017) filmgoing couple
- Richard Kandt (1867–1918), doctor and explorer
- Ernst Hartwig Kantorowicz (1895–1963), historian
- Marek Karpinski, computer scientist
- Günther von Kluge (1882–1944), Field Marshal
- Krzysztof Komeda (1931–1969), jazz musician
- Leo Königsberger (1837–1921), mathematician
- Kazimierz Kordylewski (1903–1981), Polish astronomer, claimed discovery of Kordylewski Clouds
- Agnieszka Korneluk (born 1994), volleyball player
- Antoni Kraszewski (1797–1870), politician
- Germaine Krull (1897–1985), photographer
- Weronika Książkiewicz (born 1981), actress
- Jakub Kucner (born 1988), male model
- Gerard Labuda (1916–2010), historian
- Jarosław Leitgeber (1848–1933), purveyor of Polish books under partitions
- Paul Leonhardt (1877–1934), chess master
- Arthur Liebehenschel (1901–1948), Nazi commandant of Auschwitz and Majdanek executed for war crimes
- Karol Libelt (1807–1875), philosopher
- Magda Linette (born 1992), tennis player
- Erich Ludendorff (1865–1937), general and politician
- Karol Marcinkowski (1800–1848), physician and social activist
- Władysław Markiewicz (1920–2017), sociologist
- Teofil Matecki (1810–1886), philosopher
- Heinrich Mendelssohn (1881–1959), building tycoon
- Karl-Friedrich Merten (1905–1993), U-boat commander
- Małgorzata Musierowicz (born 1945), novelist
- Andrzej Niegolewski (1787–1857), colonel
- Władysław Niegolewski (1814–1880), politician
- Grzegorz Nowak (born 1951), conductor
- Władysław Oleszczyński (1809–1866), sculptor
- Catherine Opalińska (1680–1747), Queen consort of Poland, Grand Duchess consort of Lithuania
- Halszka Osmólska (1930–2008), paleontologist
- Lilli Palmer (1914–1986), actress
- Janusz Pałubicki (born 1948), politician
- Kazimierz Piwarski, (1903–1968), historian
- Ignacy Posadzy, (1898–1984), priest
- Gustaw Potworowski, (1800–1860), activist
- Edward Raczyński (1786–1845), politician
- Antoni Radziwiłł (1775–1833), aristocrat
- Cyryl Ratajski (1875–1942), mayor of Poznań
- Marian Rejewski (1905–1980), mathematician, cryptologist, Enigma code machine codebreaker
- Richard Rothe (1799–1867), Lutheran theologian.
- Marcin Rożek (1885–1944), sculptor and painter
- Jerzy Różycki (1909–1942), cryptoanalist, Enigma codemachine codebreaker
- Dame Elisabeth Schwarzkopf (1915–2006), operatic and concert lyric soprano, born in Jarocin
- Urszula Sipińska (born 1947), singer-songwriter, pianist and architect
- Bohdan Smoleń (1947–2016), comedian and actor
- Mateusz Śniegocki (born 1985), professional pool player
- Agata Sobczyk (born 1988), Polish economist and politician
- Józef Struś (1510–1568), scientist and mayor of Poznań
- Sir Paweł Edmund Strzelecki (1797–1873), Polish explorer and geologist
- Anna Suszczynska (1877–1931), composer
- Michał Sczaniecki (1910–1977), historian
- Rafał Szukała (born 1971), butterfly swimmer
- Jan Szymański (born 1989), speed skater and Olympic medalist
- Mirosław Szymkowiak (born 1976) football player
- Jerzy Topolski (1928–1998), historian
- Lech Trzeciakowski (1931–2017), historian
- Hubert Wagner (1941–2002), volleyball player and head coach of Poland men's national volleyball team
- Leon Wegner (1824–1873), economist
- Jan Węglarz (born 1947), computer scientist
- Roman Wilhelmi (1936–1991), actor
- Ray Wilson (born 1968), former vocalist of Genesis
- Tommy Wiseau (born 1955), director, screenwriter, and actor, known for cult film The Room, speculated to be born here
- Zygmunt Wojciechowski, (1900–1955), historian and founder of the Western Institute
- Anna Wolff-Powęska (born 1941), historian
- Barbara Maria Zakrzewska-Nikiporczyk (born 1946), composer
- Maciej Zaremba (born 1951), a Swedish journalist
- Wiktor Zieliński (born 2001), professional pool player
- Szymon Ziółkowski (born 1976), hammer thrower, Olympic champion
- Henryk Zygalski (1906–1978), cryptoanalist, Enigma codemachine codebreaker
