= Western Institute =

Polish research center

- Instytut Zachodni. Instytut Naukowo-Badawczy im. Zygmunta Wojciechowskiego w Poznaniu
- Instytut Zachodni

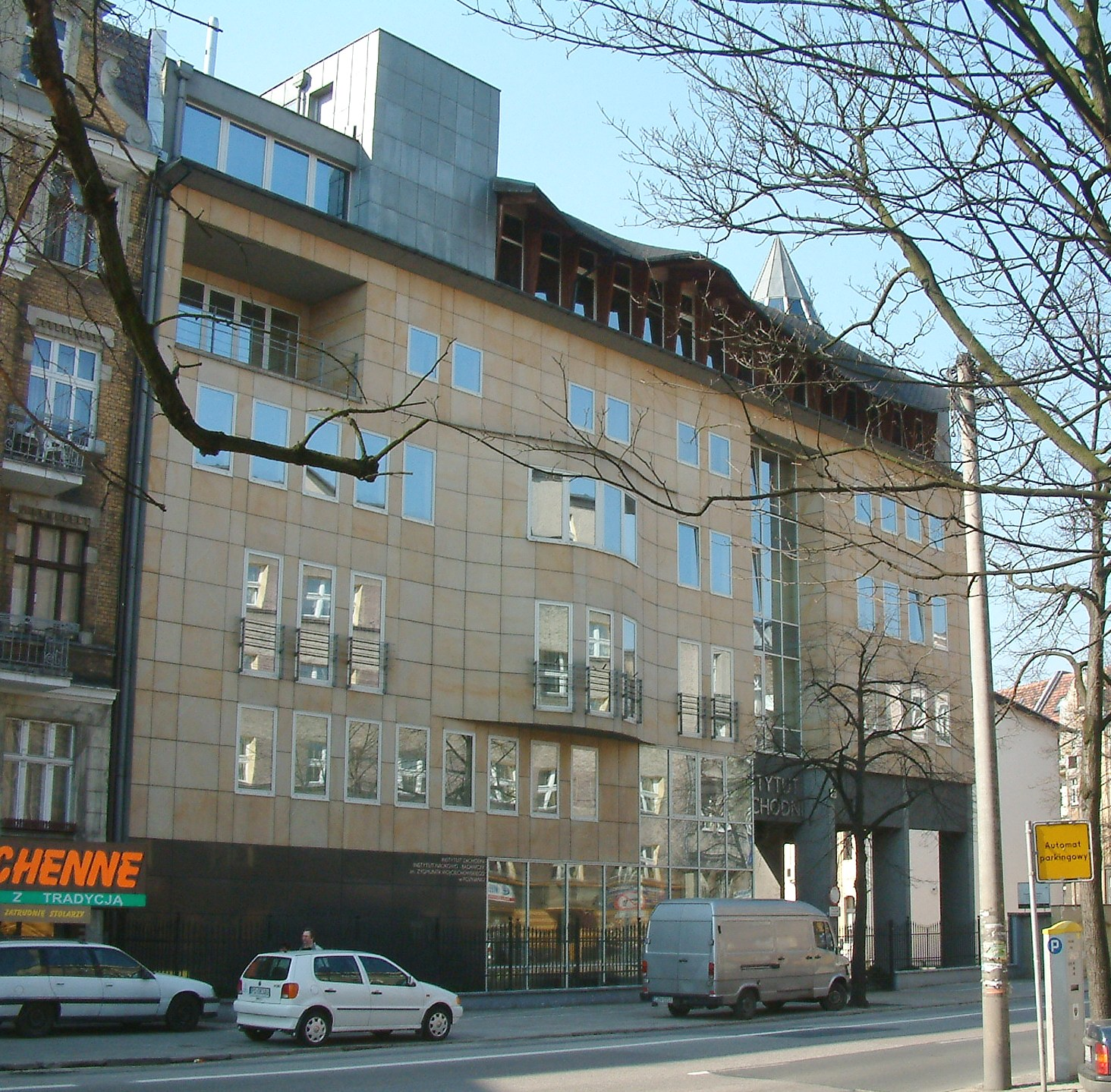
- Seat of Western Institute
- Established: February 27, 1944; 82 years ago
- Founder: Zygmunt Wojciechowski
- Founded at: Warsaw
- Type: State-sponsored think tank
- Purpose: Germany–Poland relations, European politics
- Headquarters: Mostowa Street 27 A
- Location: Poznań, Poland
- Coordinates: 52°24′19″N 16°56′20″E
- Director: Michał Nowosielski
- Deputy director: Krzysztof Malinowski
- Website: www.iz.poznan.pl

The Western Institute (Polish: Instytut Zachodni; German: West-Institut; French: L'Institut Occidental) is a scientific research society in Poznań, Poland. It focuses on the Western provinces of Poland (including Greater Poland, Silesia, Pomerania), history, economy and politics of Germany, and contemporary and historical Polish-German relations.

Established by professor Zygmunt Wojciechowski in 1944 in Warsaw, since 1945 based in Poznań. There were branches in Warsaw (1945–1953), Wrocław (1948–1949), and scientific posts in Kraków and Olsztyn.

== History ==
The Western Institute was founded in 1944 and became the flagship of the Polish Research of the West.

== Mission ==
The mission of the Institute is to conduct research projects within fields of political science, sociology, history, economics and law-especially focusing on Polish-German issues as well as European politics. It has been founded by a group of Poznań University professor in 1944, and incorporated with Polish Ministry of Foreign Affairs in 1992

== Historiographical assessment and legacy ==
In contemporary scholarship, the wartime and communist-era work of the Western Institute is evaluated through a nuanced lens that distinguishes between its valuable documentary achievements and its structural role in state-directed politics of history (polityka historyczna).

Modern historiography heavily criticizes the institute's early decades for its dependency on nationalist and ethnocentric dogmas. Polish historians such as Jan M. Piskorski and Robert Traba, alongside international scholars like Gregor Thum, have critically deconstructed the institute's early post-war role as a pragmatic expert alliance between its national-democratic founders, such as Wojciechowski, and the emerging communist regime. The institute effectively institutionalized a rigid "national paradigm" (paradygmat narodowy), providing the historical, archaeological, and geopolitical arguments required to normalize the forced displacement of the German population and legitimize the annexation of the so-called Recovered Territories. Critical scholarship emphasizes that this framework was built upon the ideological premise of an eternal, biological German-Polish antagonism, which narrowed the academic focus to a search for an exclusive Slavic continuity while deliberately erasing the region's complex, multi-layered German heritage.

Following the formal recognition of East Germany by the Polish People's Republic in 1949, the institute underwent a process of ideological Sovietization. Its researchers were pressured to artificially divide their scholarship into a heavy critique of "West German revanchism" while maintaining strict ideological compliance and censorship regarding the socialist East. Historian Richard Blanke has noted that much of the academic output produced during the height of the communist era suffered from systemic anti-German bias, rigid methodology, and direct political instrumentalization.

Conversely, contemporary scholarship heavily praises the institute's pioneering efforts in documentation and international law. Its foundational source collection, Documenta Occupationis, which meticulously recorded Nazi war crimes in occupied Poland, is universally recognized by modern Israeli, American, and German scholars as an indispensable and highly reliable canon of historical research. This contribution to documenting the realities of the occupation was prominently lauded by Polish historian and diplomat Władysław Bartoszewski. Furthermore, the institute's legal and political experts successfully drafted the international law frameworks that defended the inviolability of the Oder–Neisse line, providing the essential groundwork for the Treaty of Warsaw and the eventual German-Polish Border Treaty of 1990.

Following the fall of communism in 1989, particularly under the long-standing leadership of director Anna Wolff-Powęska, the Western Institute underwent a profound paradigm shift. It abandoned its former ethnocentric, confrontational frameworks, transitioned toward a critical transnational perspective, and reestablished itself as a leading institution for Polish-German reconciliation, academic dialogue, and collaborative European research.

== Directors ==
- 1945–1955 – Zygmunt Wojciechowski
- 1956–1958 – Kazimierz Piwarski
- 1959–1961 – Gerard Labuda
- 1961–1964 – Michał Sczaniecki
- 1964–1965 – Zdzisław Kaczmarczyk
- 1966–1973 – Władysław Markiewicz
- 1974–1978 – Lech Trzeciakowski
- 1978–1990 – Antoni Czubiński
- 1990–2004 – Anna Wolff-Powęska
- 2004–2011 – Andrzej Sakson
- 2013–2017 – Michał Nowosielski
- since 2017 – Justyna Schulz

== Main publications ==
- The Western Review (Przegląd Zachodni)
- Polish Western Affairs
- La Pologne et les Affaires Occidentales

== See also ==
- Government Delegate's Office at Home
