= Oder–Neisse line =

German–Polish border since the end of World War II

Coordinates: 53°55′34.70″N 14°13′26.50″E

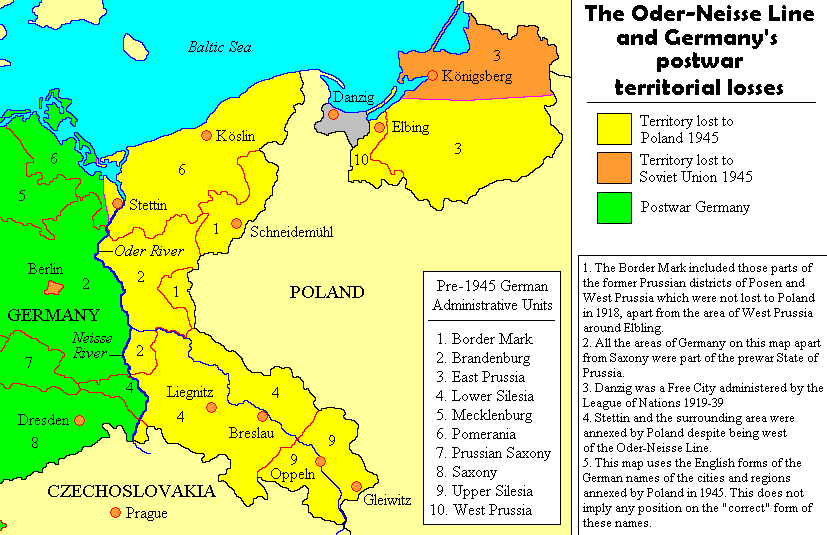
The Oder–Neisse line

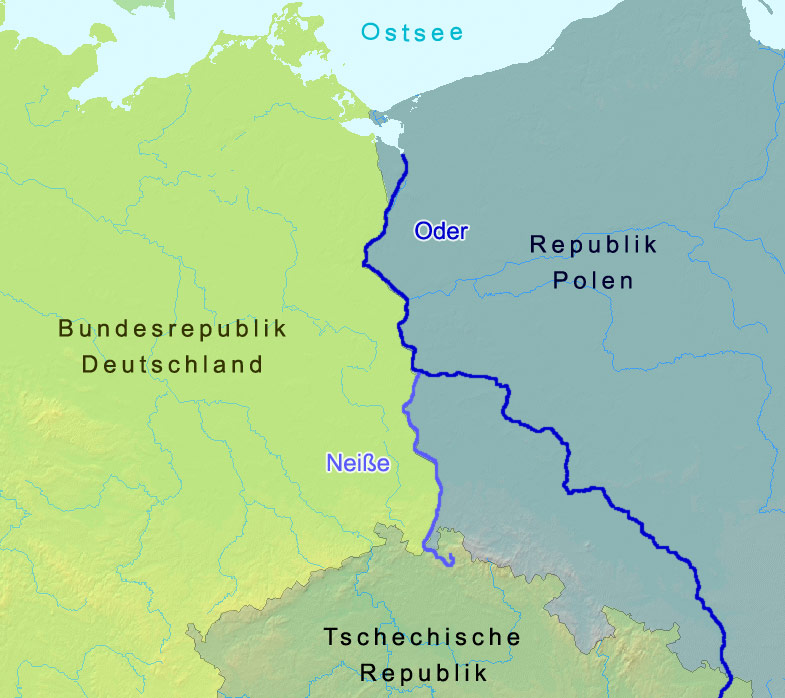
The Oder and Neisse rivers

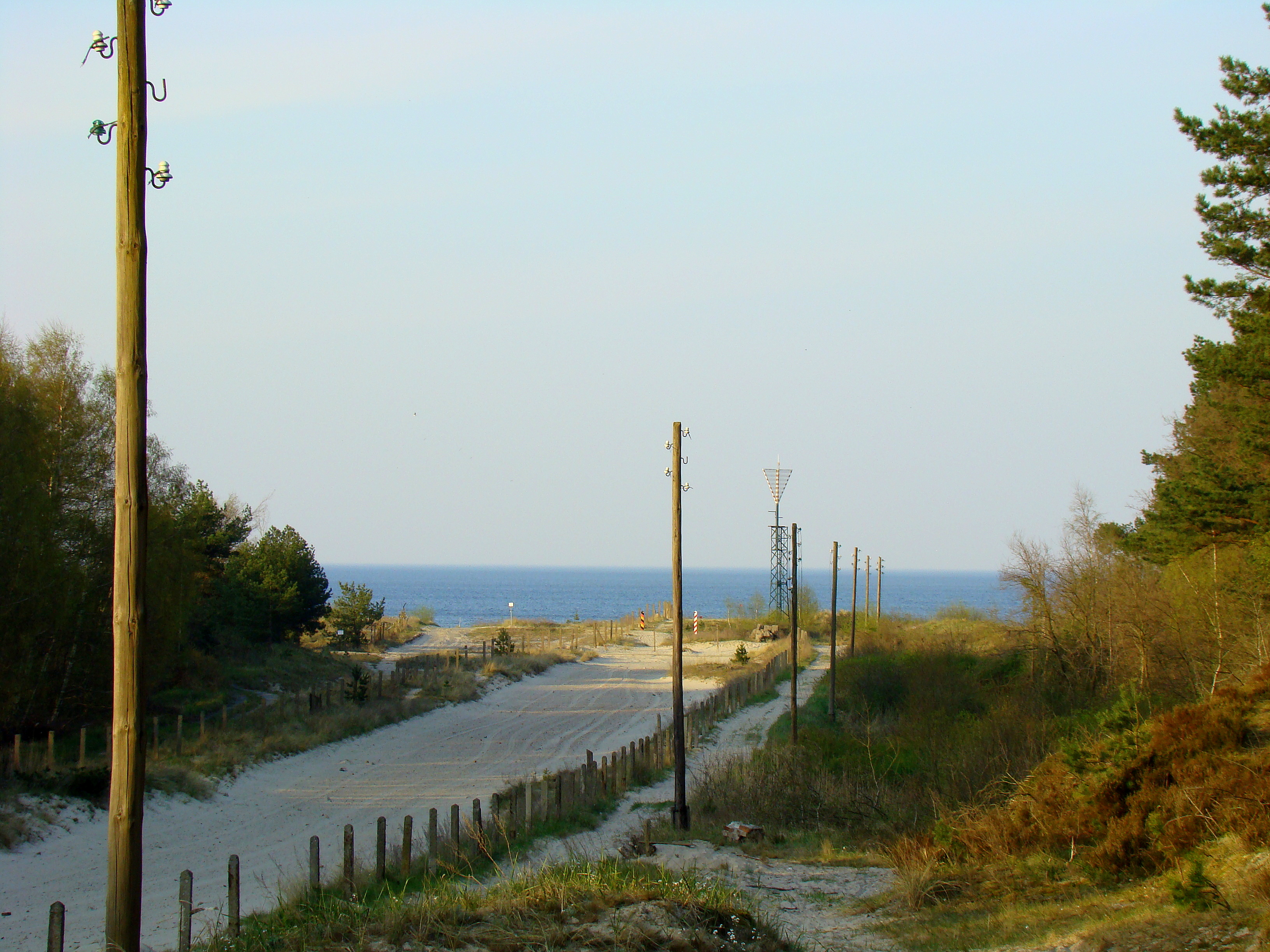
The Oder–Neisse line at Usedom (2008)

Oder–Neisse line (German: Oder-Neiße-Grenze; Polish: granica na Odrze i Nysie Łużyckiej) is an unofficial term for the modern border between Germany and Poland. The line generally follows the Oder and Lusatian Neisse rivers, meeting the Baltic Sea in the north. A small portion of Polish territory lies west of the line, including the cities of Szczecin and Świnoujście (German: Stettin and Swinemünde).

In post-war Poland, the government described the Oder–Neisse line as the result of "tough negotiations" between Polish Communists and Joseph Stalin, leader of the Soviet Union at the time. However, according to the modern Institute of National Remembrance, Polish aspirations had no impact on the outcome; rather, the idea of a westward shift of the Polish border was adopted synthetically by Stalin, who was the final arbiter in the matter. Stalin's political goals influenced his idea of a swap of western for eastern territory, thus ensuring Soviet leverage over both countries. Historian Włodzimierz Suleja argues the settlement also reflected an intention to set Poles and Germans against each other by entrenching a territorial dispute. As with before the war, some fringe groups advocated restoring the old border between Poland and Germany.

All pre-war German territories east of the line and within the 1937 German boundaries – comprising nearly one quarter (23.8 percent) of the Weimar Republic's land area of 111,765 square kilometres (43,153 sq mi) – were ceded to Poland and the Soviet Union under the changes decided at the Potsdam Conference. The majority of these territories, including Silesia, Pomerania, and the southern part of East Prussia, were ceded to Poland. The remainder, consisting of northern East Prussia, including the German city of Königsberg (renamed Kaliningrad), was allocated to the Soviet Union, as Kaliningrad Oblast within the Russian SFSR. Much of the German population in these territories – estimated at 12 million in autumn 1944 – had fled in the wake of the Soviet Red Army's advance.

The Oder–Neisse line marked the border between East Germany and Poland from 1950 to 1990. The two Communist governments agreed to the border in 1950, while West Germany, after a period of refusal, adhered to the border, with reservations, in 1972 (treaty signed in 1970). After the revolutions of 1989, Poland and the newly reunified Germany accepted the line as their border in the 1990 German–Polish Border Treaty, which was ratified in 1992.

== History ==
=== Background ===
The lower River Oder in Silesia was Piast Poland's western border from the 10th until the 13th century. From around the time of World War I, some proposed restoring this line, in the belief that it would provide protection against Germany. One of the first proposals was made in the Russian Empire. Later, when the Nazis gained power, the German territory to the east of the line was militarised by Germany with a view to a future war, and the Polish population faced Germanisation. The policies of Nazi Germany also encouraged nationalism among the German minority in Poland.

While a process of Germanisation in lands east of the Limes Sorabicus line had already begun to take place between the 12th and 14th centuries, there were many areas in which the German population had hardly settled at all, such that this process of Germanisation extended well into the 19th and 20th centuries. For example, on Rugia Island, the local Slavic culture and language persisted into the 19th century; this was also the case for many areas between the Oder–Neisse and interwar Polish border. About half of what was Farther Pomerania remained plurality Kashubian or Polish until the 18th and 19th centuries, with surviving majority Slavic pockets extending as far west as Dievenow. In 1905, Arnošt Muka observed that "there remained in that land an old Slav national grouping with types and means of settlement, customs and habits unchanged through to this day in the character and outlook of the inhabitants”. The situation was similar in the Western part of Silesia, where Polish and Silesian languages remained dominant by the end of the 18th century in areas such as Ohlau, Groß Wartenberg and Namslau.

Before World War II, Poland's western border with Germany had been fixed under the terms of the Treaty of Versailles of 1919. It partially followed the historic border between the Holy Roman Empire and Greater Poland, but with certain adjustments that were intended to reasonably reflect the ethnic compositions of small areas near the traditional provincial borders. The fate of Upper Silesia was to be decided in a plebiscite, which produced a vote of 59.8% in favour of Germany. The plebiscite took place amidst severe ethnic tensions, as German authorities and Freikorps clashed and persecuted the local Polish population, and the Poles organised massive strikes and protests. The plebiscite allowed both permanent inhabitants of the area but also people born in the region to vote, regardless of their current location or time spent living in Silesia. Voters who participated in the plebiscite despite not living in Upper Silesia were called "migrants", and made up 192,408 (16%) of the total electorate of 1,186,234. As these "migrants" voted overwhelmingly for Germany, the local Polish population considered the plebiscite to be fraudulent, resulting in three Silesian Uprisings. Eventually, the region was divided roughly equally, with some majority Polish regions remaining in Germany, and some German provinces being ceded to Poland.

At the Paris Peace Conference in 1919, the Polish delegation led by Roman Dmowski requested the inclusion of the city of Danzig in the Polish state, arguing that the city was "rightfully part of Poland" because it was Polish until 1793, and that Poland would not be economically viable without it. During the First Partition of Poland in 1772, the inhabitants of Danzig fought fiercely for it to remain a part of Poland, but as a result of the Germanisation process in the 19th century, 90% of the people in Danzig were German by 1919, which made the Entente leaders at the Paris Peace Conference compromise by creating the Free City of Danzig, a city-state in which Poland had certain special rights. The city of Danzig was 90% German and 10% Polish, yet the countryside surrounding Danzig was overwhelmingly Polish, and the ethnically Polish rural areas included in the Free City of Danzig objected, arguing that they wanted to be part of Poland.

The Oder–Neisse line as the concept of a future Polish border appeared among Polish nationalist circles in the late 19th century; Jan Ludwik Popławski is considered to be one of the first advocates for the return of "Piast Poland", although his writings mainly focused on Upper Silesia, Opolian Silesia and the southern part of East Prussia, as these regions remained majority Polish. In 1918, Bolesław Jakimiak advocated for a Polish border along the rivers of Oder and Lusatian Neisse, possibly inspired by the proposals of Russian nationalists. He described the German expansion towards the formerly Slavic lands and considered it a "matter of historical justice" to have East Prussia, the entirety of Pomerania, East Brandenburg and both Lower and Upper Silesia become "integral parts" of a future Polish state. At the Paris Peace Conference, Polish commission supervised by Jules Cambon and headed by Roman Dmowski proposed a Polish border that would encompass the entirety of Upper Silesia and most of Opolian Silesia, including the cities of Ratibor, Neustadt, Falkenberg, Brieg, Oels and Militsch in Poland. The entirety of Greater Poland was also to be ceded to the Polish state, along with Danzig, Warmia and Masuria. While the postulate of the Polish delegation gained acceptance of the rest of the conference, it was met with vehement protest from David Lloyd George, whose opposition led to border changes in favour of Germany.

Between the wars, the concept of "Western thought" (myśl zachodnia) became popular among some Polish nationalists. The "Polish motherland territories" were defined by scholars, like Zygmunt Wojciechowski, as the areas included in Piast Poland in the 10th century. Some Polish historians called for the "return" of territories up to the river Elbe. The proponents of these ideas, in prewar Poland often described as a "group of fantasists", were organized in the National Party, which was also opposed to the government of Poland, the Sanacja. The proposal to establish the border along the Oder and Neisse was not seriously considered for a long time. After World War II the Polish Communists, lacking their own expertise regarding the Western border, adopted the National Democratic concept of western thought.

After Nazi Germany invaded and occupied Poland, some Polish politicians started to see a need to alter the border with Germany. A secure border was seen as essential, especially in the light of Nazi atrocities. During the war, Nazi Germany committed genocide against Poland's population, especially Jews, whom they classified as Untermenschen ("sub-humans"). Alteration to the western border was seen as a punishment for the Germans for their atrocities and a compensation for Poland. (Note: "Przesunięcie granicy zachodniej na korzyść Polski było uważane także za jedną z form ukarania Niemców za popełnione zbrodnie i zadośćuczynienia Polsce.") The participation in the genocide by German minorities and their paramilitary organizations, such as the Selbstschutz ("self defense"), and support for Nazism among German society also connected the issue of border changes with the idea of population transfers intended to avoid such events in the future.

Initially the Polish government-in-exile envisioned territorial changes after the war which would incorporate East Prussia, Danzig (Gdańsk) and the Oppeln (Opole) Silesian region into post-war Poland, along with a straightening of the Pomeranian border and minor acquisition in the Lauenburg (Lębork) area. The border changes were to provide Poland with a safe border and to prevent the Germans from using Eastern Pomerania and East Prussia as strategic assets against Poland. (Note: "Nowa Granica miała osłabić korzystny dotąd układ strategiczny wykorzystywany przeciwko Polsce (Prusy Wschodnie, Pomorze Zachodnie).") Only with the changing situation during the war were these territorial proposals modified. In October 1941 the exile newspaper Dziennik Polski postulated a postwar Polish western border that would include East Prussia, Silesia up to the Lusatian Neisse and at least both banks of the Oder's mouth. While these territorial claims were regarded as "megalomaniac" by the Soviet ambassador in London, in October 1941 Stalin announced the "return of East Prussia to Slavdom" after the war. On 16 December 1941 Stalin remarked in a meeting with the British Foreign Minister Anthony Eden, though inconsistent in detail, that Poland should receive all German territory up to the river Oder. In May 1942 General Władysław Sikorski, Prime Minister of the Polish government-in-exile, sent two memoranda to the US government, sketching a postwar Polish western border along the Oder and Neisse (inconsistent about the Eastern Neisse and the Lusatian Neisse). However, the proposal was dropped by the government-in-exile in late 1942.

=== Tehran Conference ===
At the Tehran Conference in late 1943, the Soviet leader Joseph Stalin raised the subject of Poland's western frontier and its extension to the River Oder. While the Americans were not interested in discussing any border changes at that time, Roosevelt agreed that in general the Polish border should be extended west to the Oder, while Polish eastern borders should be shifted westwards; he also admitted that due to elections at home he could not express his position publicly. British Foreign Minister Anthony Eden wrote in his diary that "A difficulty is that the Americans are terrified of the subject which [Roosevelt advisor] Harry [Hopkins] called 'political dynamite' for their elections. But, as I told him, if we cannot get a solution, Polish-Soviet relations six months from now, with Soviet armies in Poland, will be infinitely worse and elections nearer." Winston Churchill compared the westward shift of Poland to soldiers taking two steps "left close" and declared in his memoirs: "If Poland trod on some German toes that could not be helped, but there must be a strong Poland."

The British government formed a clear position on the issue and at the first meeting of the European Advisory Commission on 14 January 1944, recommended "that East Prussia and Danzig, and possibly other areas, will ultimately be given to Poland" as well as agreeing on a Polish "frontier on the Oder".

=== Yalta Conference ===
In February 1945, American and British officials met in Yalta and agreed on the basics on Poland's future borders. In the east, the British agreed to the Curzon line but recognised that the US might push for Lwów to be included in post-war Poland. In the west, Poland should receive part of East Prussia, Danzig, the eastern tip of Pomerania and Upper Silesia. President Franklin D. Roosevelt said that it would "make it easier for me at home" if Stalin were generous to Poland with respect to Poland's eastern frontiers. Winston Churchill said a Soviet concession on that point would be admired as "a gesture of magnanimity" and declared that, with respect to Poland's post-war government, the British would "never be content with a solution which did not leave Poland a free and independent state." With respect to Poland's western frontiers, Stalin noted that the Polish Prime Minister in exile, Stanisław Mikołajczyk, had been pleased when Stalin had told him Poland would be granted Stettin/Szczecin and the German territories east of the Western Neisse. Yalta was the first time that the Soviets openly declared support for a German–Polish frontier on the Western as opposed to the Eastern Neisse. Churchill objected to the Western Neisse frontier, saying that "it would be a pity to stuff the Polish goose so full of German food that it got indigestion." He added that many Britons would be shocked if such large numbers of Germans were driven out of these areas, to which Stalin responded that "many Germans" had "already fled before the Red Army." Poland's western frontier was ultimately left to be decided at the Potsdam Conference.

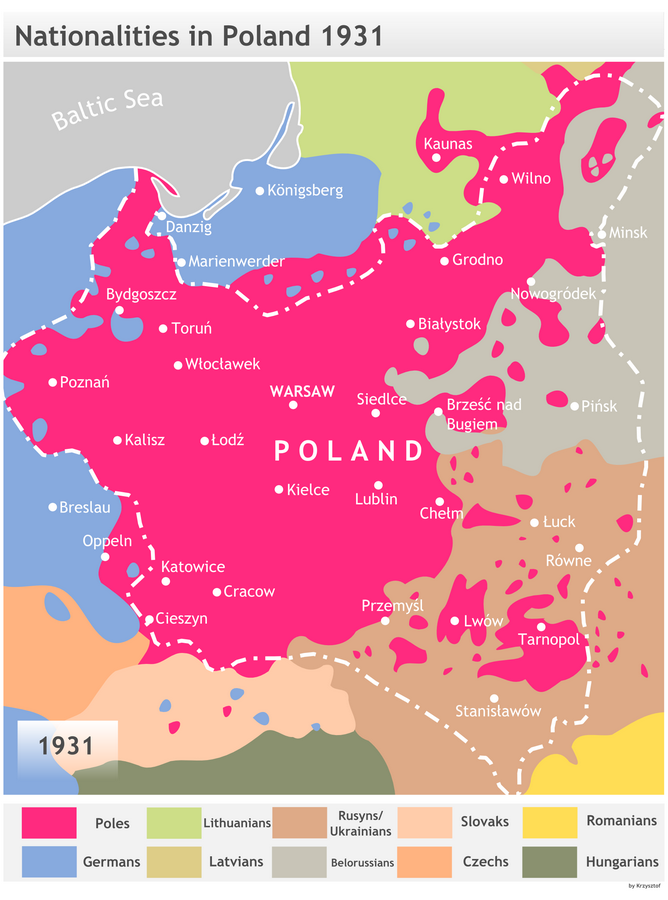
Dominant ethnicities in and around Poland, 1931, according to Polish historian Henryk Zieliński.

Originally, Germany was to retain Stettin, while the Poles were to annex East Prussia with Königsberg (now Kaliningrad). The Polish government had in fact demanded this since the start of World War II in 1939, because of East Prussia's strategic position that allegedly undermined the defense of Poland. Other territorial changes proposed by the Polish government were the transfer of the Silesian region of Oppeln and the Pomeranian regions of Danzig, Bütow and Lauenburg, and the straightening of the border somewhat in Western Pomerania.

However, Stalin decided that he wanted Königsberg as a year-round warm water port for the Soviet Navy, and he argued that the Poles should receive Stettin instead. The prewar Polish government-in-exile had little to say in these decisions, but insisted on retaining the city of Lwów (Lvov, Lemberg, now Lviv) in Galicia. Stalin refused to concede, and instead proposed that all of Lower Silesia including Breslau (Polish: Wrocław) be given to Poland. Many Poles from Lwów would later be moved to populate the city.

Westward shift of Poland after World War II. Blue line: Curzon Line of 8 December 1919. Pink areas: prewar German territory transferred to Poland after the war. Grey area: prewar Polish territory transferred to the Soviet Union after the war.

The eventual border was not the most far-reaching territorial change that was proposed. There were suggestions to include areas further west so that Poland could include the small minority population of ethnic Slavic Sorbs who lived near Cottbus and Bautzen.

The precise location of the western border was left open. The western Allies accepted in general that the Oder would be the future western border of Poland. Still in doubt was whether the border should follow the eastern or western Neisse, and whether Stettin, now Szczecin, which lay west of the Oder, should remain German or be placed in Poland (with an expulsion of the German population). Stettin was the traditional seaport of Berlin. It had a dominant German population and a small Polish minority that numbered 2,000 in the interwar period. The western Allies sought to place the border on the eastern Neisse at Breslau, but Stalin refused to budge. Suggestions of a border on the Bóbr (Bober) were also rejected by the Soviets.

Nikita Khrushchev in his memoirs said: "I had only one desire – that Poland's borders were moved as far west as possible."

Not satisfied with the Oder–Neisse line, the Polish communists initially wanted to own the entire island of Usedom and push the border west to the Randow river; however they were refused by Stalin.

=== Potsdam Conference ===
Allied Occupation Zones in Germany from 1945 until 1949.

At Potsdam, Stalin argued for the Oder–Neisse line on the grounds that the Polish Government demanded this frontier and that there were no longer any Germans left east of this line. Several Polish Communist leaders appeared at the conference to advance arguments for an Oder–Western Neisse frontier. The port of Stettin was demanded for Eastern European exports. If Stettin was Polish, then "in view of the fact that the supply of water is found between the Oder and the Lausitzer Neisse, if the Oder's tributaries were controlled by someone else the river could be blocked." Soviet forces had initially expelled Polish administrators who tried to seize control of Stettin in May and June, and the city was governed by a German communist-appointed mayor, under the surveillance of the Soviet occupiers, until 5 July 1945.

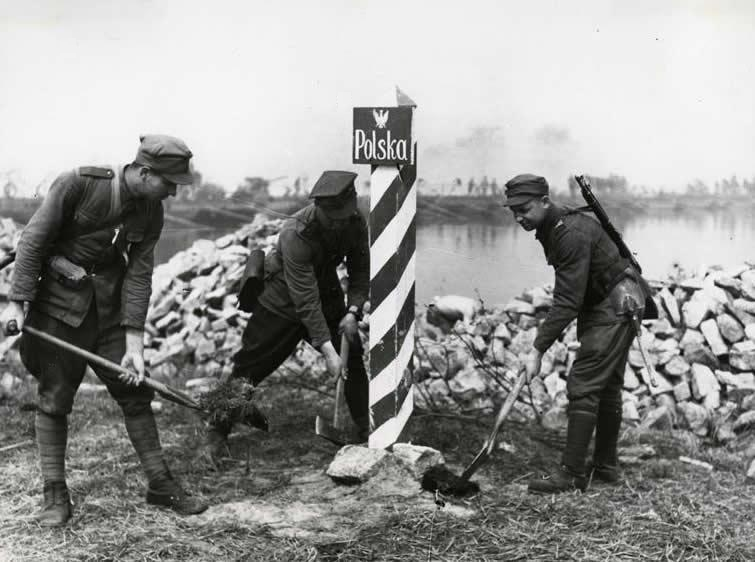
Marking the new Polish-German Border in 1945

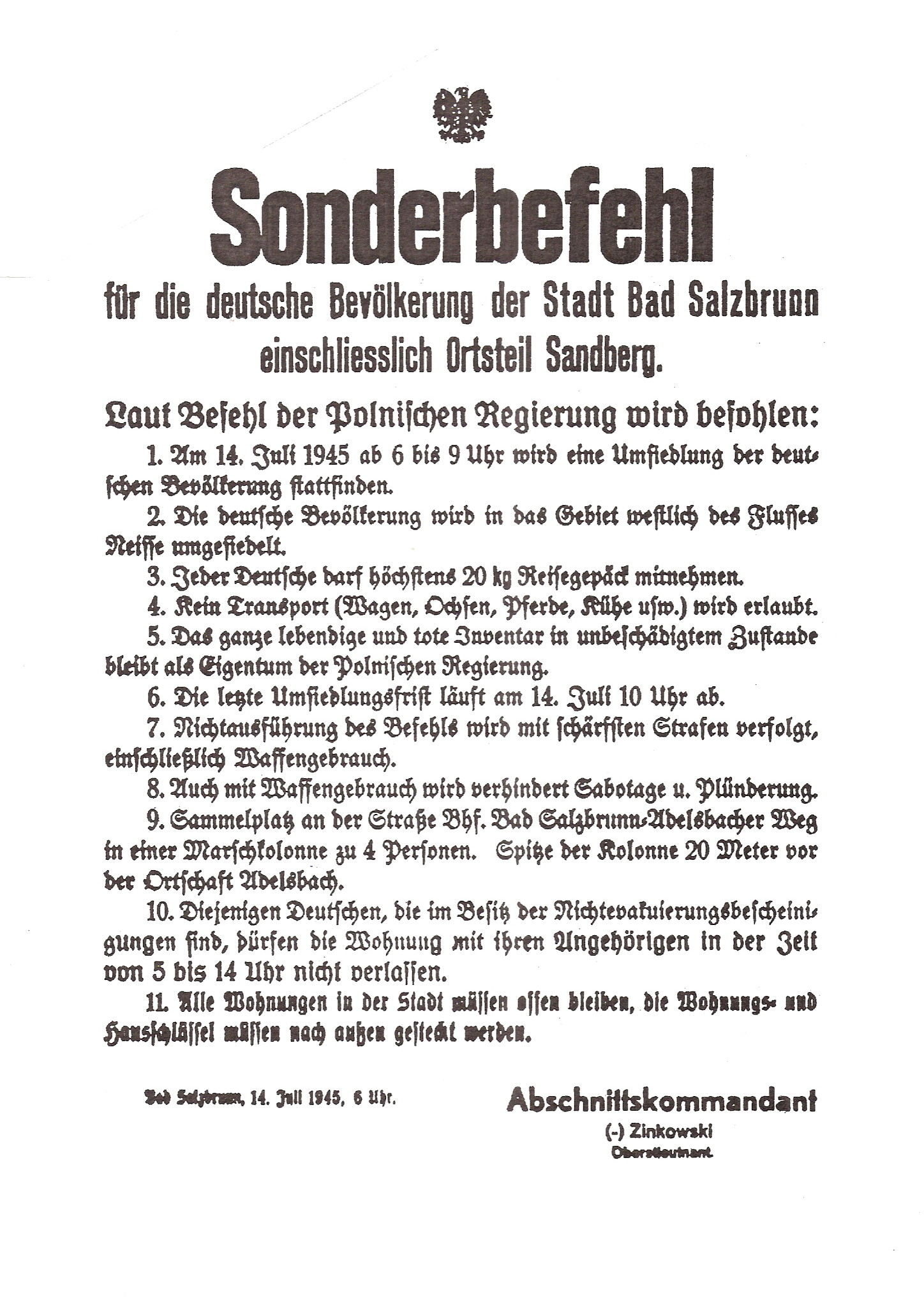
Polish authorities issued an order to the population of Bad Salzbrunn (Szczawno-Zdrój) to force them to immediately leave Poland on 14 July 1945, issued at 6 a.m. to be executed until 10 am

James Byrnes – who had been appointed as U.S. Secretary of State earlier that month – later advised the Soviets that the U.S. was prepared to concede the area east of the Oder and the Eastern Neisse to Polish administration, and for it not to consider it part of the Soviet occupation zone, in return for a moderation of Soviet demands for reparations from the Western occupation zones. An Eastern Neisse boundary would have left Germany with roughly half of Silesia – including the majority of Wrocław (Breslau), the former provincial capital and the largest city in the region. The Soviets insisted that the Poles would not accept this. The Polish representatives (and Stalin) were in fact willing to concede a line following the Oder–Bober–Queis (Odra–Bóbr–Kwisa) rivers through Żagań (Sagan) and Lubań (Lauban), but even this small concession ultimately proved unnecessary, since on the next day Byrnes told the Soviet Foreign Minister Vyacheslav Molotov that the Americans would reluctantly concede to the Western Neisse.

Byrnes' concession undermined the British position, and although the British Foreign Secretary Ernest Bevin raised objections, the British eventually agreed to the American concession. In response to American and British statements that the Poles were claiming far too much German territory, Stanisław Mikołajczyk argued that "the western lands were needed as a reservoir to absorb the Polish population east of the Curzon Line, Poles who returned from the West, and Polish people who lived in the overcrowded central districts of Poland." The U.S. and the U.K. were also negative towards the idea of giving Poland an occupation zone in Germany. However, on 29 July, President Truman handed Molotov a proposal for a temporary solution whereby the U.S. accepted Polish administration of land as far as the Oder and Eastern Neisse until a final peace conference determined the boundary. In return for this large concession, the U.S. demanded that "each of the occupation powers take its share of reparations from its own [Occupation] Zone and provide for admission of Italy into the United Nations." The Soviets stated that they were not pleased "because it denied Polish administration of the area between the two Neisse rivers."

On 29 July Stalin asked Bolesław Bierut, the head of the Soviet-controlled Polish government, to accept in consideration of the large American concessions. The Polish delegation decided to accept a boundary of the administration zone at "somewhere between the western Neisse and the Kwisa". Later that day the Poles changed their mind: "Bierut, accompanied by Rola-Zymierski, returned to Stalin and argued against any compromise with the Americans. Stalin told his Polish protégés that he would defend their position at the conference."

== World War II aftermath ==
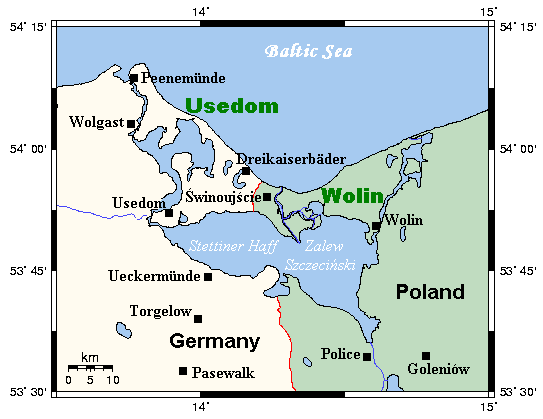
Oder Lagoon area with border on western bank of the Oder, city of Szczecin to the south.

Finally on 2 August 1945, the Potsdam Agreement of the United States, the United Kingdom, and the Soviet Union, in anticipation of the final peace treaty, placed the German territories east of the Oder–Neisse line formally under Polish administrative control. It was also decided that all Germans remaining in the new and old Polish territory should be expelled. One reason for this version of the new border was that it was the shortest possible border between Poland and Germany. It is only 472 km (293 miles) long, from one of the northernmost points of the Czech Republic to one of the southernmost points of the Baltic Sea at the Oder estuary.

Winston Churchill was not present at the end of the Conference, since the results of the British elections had made it clear that he had been defeated. Churchill later claimed that he would never have agreed to the Oder–Western Neisse line, and in his famous Iron Curtain speech declared that

The Russian-dominated Polish Government has been encouraged to make enormous and wrongful inroads upon Germany, and mass expulsions of millions of Germans on a scale grievous and undreamed-of are now taking place.

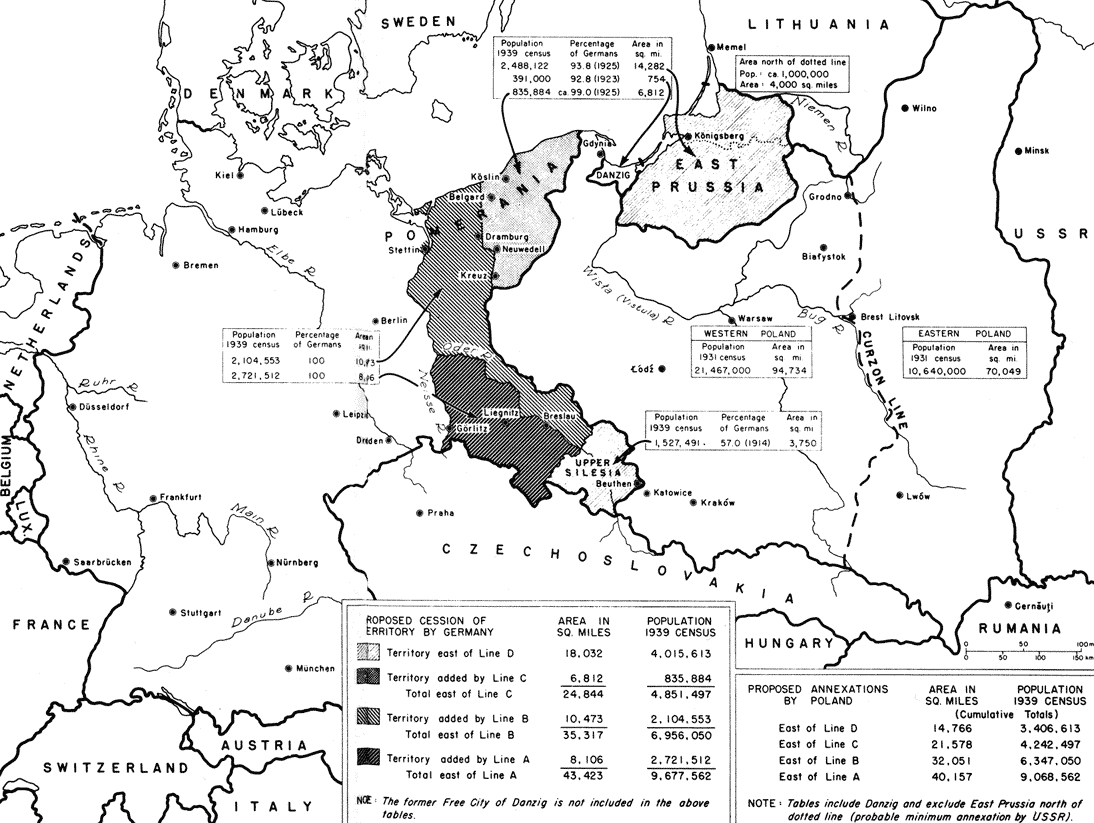
US Department of State Demographics map from 10 January 1945 Germany – Poland Proposed Territorial Changes, based in part on German prewar population census. Was used for border discussions at the Potsdam Conference later in 1945.

Not only were the German territorial changes of the Nazis reversed, but the border was moved westward, deep into territory which had been in 1937 part of Germany with an almost exclusively German population. The new line placed almost all of Silesia, more than half of Pomerania, the eastern portion of Brandenburg, a small area of Saxony, the former Free City of Danzig and the southern two-thirds of East Prussia (Masuria and Warmia) within Poland (see Former eastern territories of Germany). The northeastern third of East Prussia was directly annexed by the Soviet Union.

These territorial changes were followed by large-scale population transfers, involving 14 million people all together from the whole of Eastern Europe, including many people already shifted during the war. Nearly all remaining Germans from the territory annexed by Poland were expelled, while Polish persons who had been displaced into Germany, usually as slave laborers, returned to settle in the area. In addition to this, the Polish population originating from the eastern half of the former Second Polish Republic, now annexed by the Soviet Union, was mostly expelled and transferred to the newly acquired territories.

Most Poles supported the new border, mostly out of fear of renewed German aggression and German irredentism. The border was also presented as a just consequence for the Nazi German state's initiation of World War II and the subsequent genocide against Poles and the attempt to destroy Polish statehood, as well as for the territorial losses of eastern Poland to the Soviet Union, mainly western Ukraine and Belarus. It has been asserted that resentment towards the expelled German population on the part of the Poles was based on the fact that the majority of that population was loyal to the Nazis during the invasion and occupation, and the active role some of them played in the persecution and mass murder of Poles and Jews. These circumstances allegedly have impeded sensitivity among Poles with respect to the expulsion committed during the aftermath of World War II.

The new order was in Stalin's interests, because it enabled the Soviet Communists to present themselves as the primary maintainer of Poland's new western border. It also provided the Soviet Union with territorial gains from part of East Prussia and the eastern part of the Second Republic of Poland.

United States Secretary of State James F. Byrnes outlined the official position of the U.S. government regarding the Oder–Neisse line in his Stuttgart Speech of 6 September 1946:

At Potsdam specific areas which were part of Germany were provisionally assigned to the Soviet Union and to Poland, subject to the final decisions of the Peace Conference. [...] With regard to Silesia and other eastern German areas, the assignment of this territory to Poland by Russia for administrative purposes had taken place before the Potsdam meeting. The heads of government agreed that, pending the final determination of Poland's western frontier, Silesia and other eastern German areas should be under the administration of the Polish state and for such purposes should not be considered as a part of the Soviet zone of occupation in Germany. However, as the Protocol of the Potsdam Conference makes clear, the heads of government did not agree to support at the peace settlement the cession of this particular area. The Soviets and the Poles suffered greatly at the hands of Hitler's invading armies. As a result of the agreement at Yalta, Poland ceded to the Soviet Union territory east of the Curzon Line. Because of this, Poland asked for revision of her northern and western frontiers. The United States will support revision of these frontiers in Poland's favor. However, the extent of the area to be ceded to Poland must be determined when the final settlement is agreed upon.

The speech was met with shock in Poland and Deputy Prime Minister Mikołajczyk immediately issued a response declaring that retention of Polish territories based on the Oder–Neisse line was matter of life and death.

Byrnes, who accepted the Lusatian Neisse as provisional Polish border, in fact did not state that such a change would take place (as was read by Germans who hoped for support to regain the lost territories). The purpose of the speech and associated US diplomatic activities was as propaganda aimed at Germany by Western Powers, who could blame the Polish–German border and German expulsions on Moscow alone.

In the late 1950s, by the time of Dwight D. Eisenhower's Presidency, the United States had largely accepted the Oder–Neisse line as final and did not support German demands regarding the border, while officially declaring a need for a final settlement in a peace treaty. In the mid-1960s the U.S. government accepted the Oder–Neisse line as binding and agreed that there would be no changes to it in the future. German revisionism regarding the border began to cost West Germany sympathies among its western allies. In 1959, France officially issued a statement supporting the Oder–Neisse line, which created controversy in West Germany.

The Oder–Neisse line was, however, never formally recognized by the United States until the revolutionary changes of 1989 and 1990. (Note: "Although the Polish and German governments signed a treaty in 1970..., the United States withheld the formal recognition of the Oder-Neisse until the revolutionary changes of 1989 and 1990, ...")

=== 'Recovered territories' ===
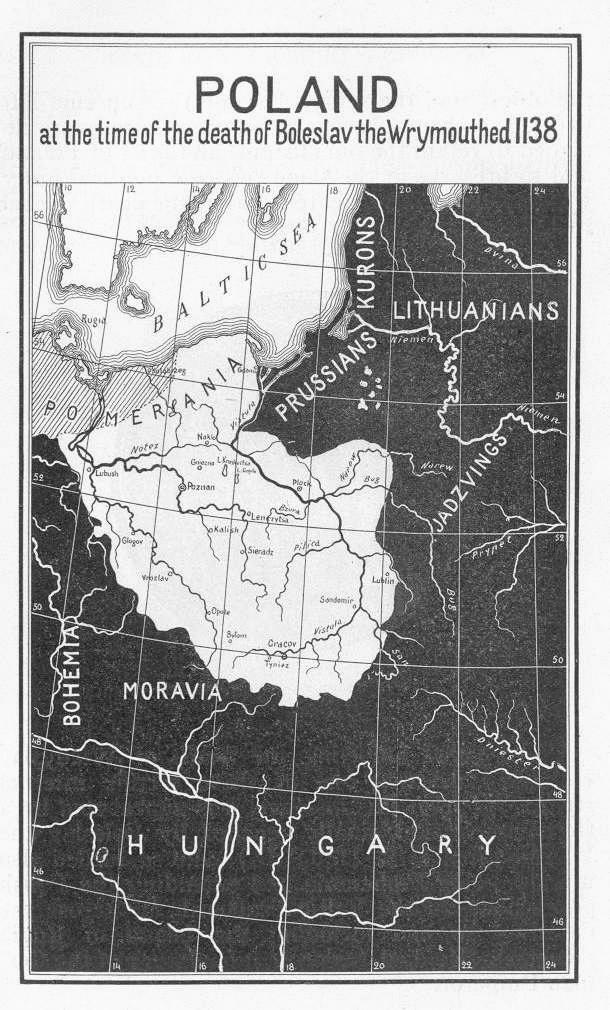
Edward Henry Lewinski Corwin's map of Polish-German borders in the 12th century (published in 1917, US)

Those territories were known in Poland as the Regained or Recovered Territories, a term based on the claim that they were in the past the possession of the Piast dynasty of Polish kings, Polish fiefs or included in the parts lost to Prussia during the Partitions of Poland. The term was widely exploited by Propaganda in the People's Republic of Poland. The creation of a picture of the new territories as an "integral part of historical Poland" in the post-war era had the aim of forging Polish settlers and repatriates arriving there into a coherent community loyal to the new Communist regime. The term was in use immediately following the end of World War II when it was part of the Communist indoctrination of the Polish settlers in those territories. The final agreements in effect compensated Poland with 112,000 km^{2} (43,000 sq mi) of former German territory in exchange for 187,000 km^{2} (72,000 sq mi) of land lying east of the Curzon Line – Polish areas occupied by the Soviet Union. Poles and Polish Jews from the Soviet Union were the subject of a process called "repatriation" (settlement within the territory of post-war Poland).

== German recognition of the border ==
=== East Germany ===
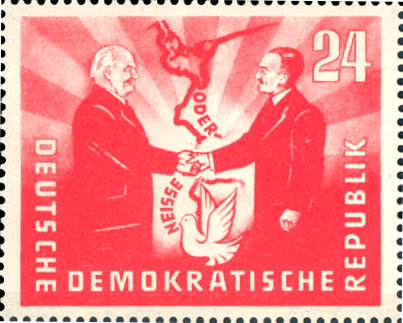
1951 East German stamp commemorative of the Treaty of Zgorzelec establishing the Oder–Neisse line as a "border of peace", featuring the presidents Wilhelm Pieck (GDR) and Bolesław Bierut (Poland)

The East German Socialist Unity Party (SED), founded 1946, originally rejected the Oder–Neisse line. Under Soviet occupation and heavy pressure by Moscow, the official phrase Friedensgrenze (border of peace) was promulgated in March–April 1947 at the Moscow Foreign Ministers Conference. The German Democratic Republic and Poland's Communist government signed the Treaty of Zgorzelec in 1950 recognizing the Oder–Neisse line, officially designated by the Communists as the "Border of Peace and Friendship".

In 1952 Stalin made recognition of the Oder–Neisse line as a permanent boundary one of the conditions for the Soviet Union to agree to a reunification of Germany (see Stalin Note). The offer was rejected by the West German Chancellor Konrad Adenauer.

=== West Germany ===
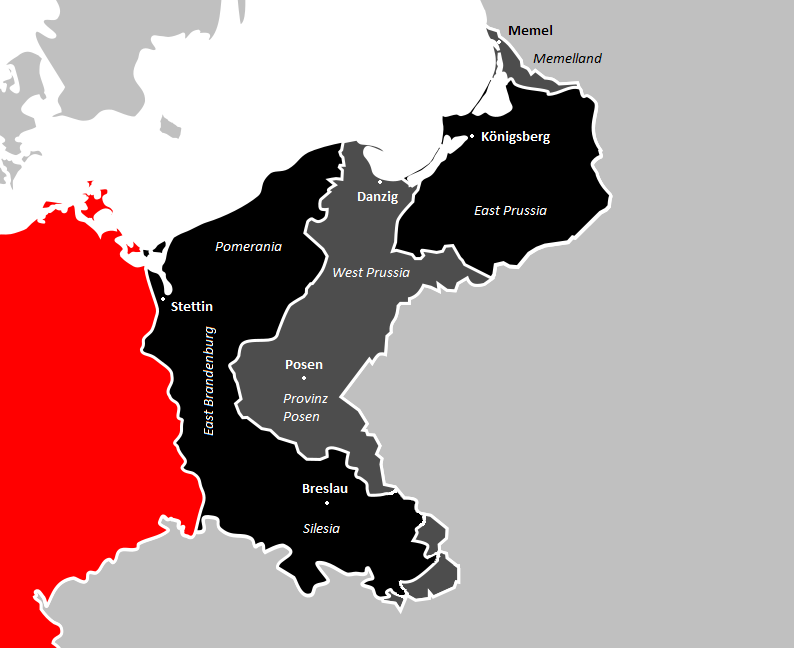
Territory lost after World War I Territory lost after World War II Present-day Germany

The West German definition of the "de jure" borders of Germany was based on the determinations of the Potsdam Agreement, which placed the German territories (as of 31 December 1937) east of the Oder–Neisse line "under the administration of the Polish State" while "the final delimitation of the western frontier of Poland should await the peace settlement". The recognition of the Oder–Neisse Line as permanent was thus only reserved to a final peace settlement with reunited Germany. (Note: Article VIII. B of the Potsdam Agreement: "In conformity with the agreement on Poland reached at the Crimea Conference the three heads of government have sought the opinion of the Polish Provisional Government of National Unity in regard to the accession of territory in the north 'end west which Poland should receive. The President of the National Council of Poland and members of the Polish Provisional Government of National Unity have been received at the Conference and have fully presented their views. The three heads of government reaffirm their opinion that the final delimitation of the western frontier of Poland should await the peace settlement. The three heads of government agree that, pending the final determination of Poland's western frontier, the former German territories cast of a line running from the Baltic Sea immediately west of Swinamunde, and thence along the Oder River to the confluence of the western Neisse River and along the Western Neisse to the Czechoslovak frontier, including that portion of East Prussia not placed under the administration of the Union of Soviet Socialist Republics in accordance with the understanding reached at this conference and including the area of the former free city of Danzig, shall be under the administration of the Polish State and for such purposes should not be considered as part of the Soviet zone of occupation in Germany.") (Note: "In den Verhandlungen mit der polnischen Regierung mußte die Frage der Anerkennung der Oder-Neiße-Linie ausgeklammert warden, denn nach der Entscheidung des Bundesverfassungsgerichts von 1975 bestanden das Deutsche Reich in seinen Grenzen von 1937 und die Viermächteverantwortung für ganz Deutschland solange fort, bis ein förmlicher Friedensvertrag geschlossen worden sei.") (Note: "Politiker und politische Gruppen verwiesen auf die Abmachungen der Potsdamer Konferenz von 1945, denen zufolge die endgültige Regelung der Oder-Neiße-Frage einem endgültigen Friedensvertrag für ganz Deutschland vorbehalten werden sollte.") (Note: "Die Gebiete östlich von Oder und Neiße sind ebenso wie das übrige Reichsgebiet in den Grenzen vom 31. Dezember 1937 von den Siegermächten bei Kriegsende nicht annektiert worden. Im Vorspruch der "Erklärung" vom 5. Juni 1945, welche die Regierungen des Vereinigten Königreichs, der Vereinigten Staaten von Amerika und der Union der Sozialistischen Sowjetrepubliken sowie die provisorische Regierung der Französischen Republik "in Anbetracht der Niederlage Deutschlands und der Übernahme der obersten Regierungsgewalt hinsichtlich Deutschlands" abgegeben haben, heißt es: "Die Übernahme ... der besagten Regierungsgewalt und Befugnisse bewirkt nicht die Annektierung Deutschlands" (Amtsblatt des Kontrollrats in Deutschland, Ergänzungsblatt Nr. 1, S. 7). Auf der Potsdamer Konferenz (Juli/August 1945) kamen Großbritannien, die Sowjetunion und die Vereinigten Staaten von Amerika überein, die deutschen Gebiete östlich von Oder und Neiße einer Sonderregelung zu unterwerfen, die von der im übrigen Reichsgebiet eingerichteten Besatzungsherrschaft deutlich abwich. Nach den Abschnitten VI und IX des als "Mitteilung über die Dreimächtekonferenz von Berlin" bezeichneten Protokolls vom 2. August 1945 (oft Potsdamer Abkommen genannt) wurden die deutschen Ostgebiete "vorbehaltlich der endgültigen Bestimmung der territorialen Fragen bei der Friedensregelung" teilweise unter sowjetische und teilweise unter polnische "Verwaltung" gestellt ... (AmtsblattBVerfGE 40, 141 (157), BVerfGE 40, 141 (158) des Kontrollrats in Deutschland, Ergänzungsblatt Nr. 1 S. 17 f.). Die sich aus dem Vorbehalt der Friedensregelung ergebende Vorläufigkeit dieser Gebietszuweisung wurde nach dem Abschluß der Potsdamer Konferenz von der Sowjetunion und Polen zunächst respektiert. Der sowjetisch-polnische Vertrag vom 16. August 1945, der den Verlauf der sowjetisch-polnischen Grenzlinie in Ostpreußen beschreibt, wiederholt in seinem Art. 3 ausdrücklich den Friedensvertragsvorbehalt unter Bezugnahme auf die Potsdamer Konferenz (United Nations Treaty Series 10 II, Nr. 61, S. 196). 66 Die drei Westmächte haben einer endgültigen Zuweisung der deutschen Ostgebiete an die Sowjetunion und Polen nicht zugestimmt. Nach der Ziffer VI des Protokolls über die Beschlüsse der Potsdamer Konferenz haben Großbritannien und die Vereinigten Staaten lediglich in Aussicht gestellt, den "grundsätzlich" akzeptierten "Vorschlag der Sowjetregierung hinsichtlich der endgültigen Übergabe der Stadt Königsberg und des anliegenden Gebiets an die Sowjetunion" vorbehaltlich einer noch vorzunehmenden Festlegung des "genauen Grenzverlaufs" bei der "bevorstehenden Friedensregelung" zu "unterstützen".) In West Germany, where the majority of the displaced refugees found refuge, recognition of the Oder–Neisse line as permanent was long regarded as unacceptable. Right from the beginning of his Chancellorship in 1949, Adenauer refused to accept the Oder–Neisse line as Germany's eastern frontier, and made it quite clear that if Germany ever reunified, the Federal Republic would lay claim to all of the land that had belonged to Germany as at 1 January 1937. Adenauer's rejection of the border adjustments resulting from the Potsdam agreement was viewed critically by some in Poland. Soon after the agreement was signed, both the US and Soviet Union accepted the border as the de facto border of Poland. United States Secretary James Byrnes accepted the Western Neisse as the provisional Polish border. While in his Stuttgart Speech he played around with an idea of modification of borders (in Poland's favor), giving fuel to speculation by German nationalists and revisionists, the State department confessed that the speech was simply intended to "smoke out Molotov's attitude on the eve of elections in Germany". The Adenauer government went to the Constitutional Court to receive a ruling that declared that legally speaking the frontiers of the Federal Republic were those of Germany as at 1 January 1937, that the Potsdam Declaration of 1945 which announced that the Oder–Neisse line was Germany's "provisional" eastern border was invalid, and that as such the Federal Republic considered all of the land east of the Oder–Neisse line to be "illegally" occupied by Poland and the Soviet Union. The American historian Gerhard Weinberg pointed out that in claiming the frontiers of 1937, West Germany was in fact claiming the frontiers established by the Treaty of Versailles, which the entire interwar German leadership had claimed to be totally unacceptable from 1919 to 1939, and which perhaps indicated that Versailles was nowhere near as harsh as claimed, especially when compared with the far greater territorial losses imposed by the Oder–Neisse line. Not all in Adenauer's government supported this; politicians like minister Seebohm criticized limiting German territorial demands to the borders of 1937, alluding to pre-Versailles borders, as did the organisation of German expelled BdV. In 1962 a virulent anti-Polish organization called AKON was founded in West Germany which published maps with the borders of 1914.

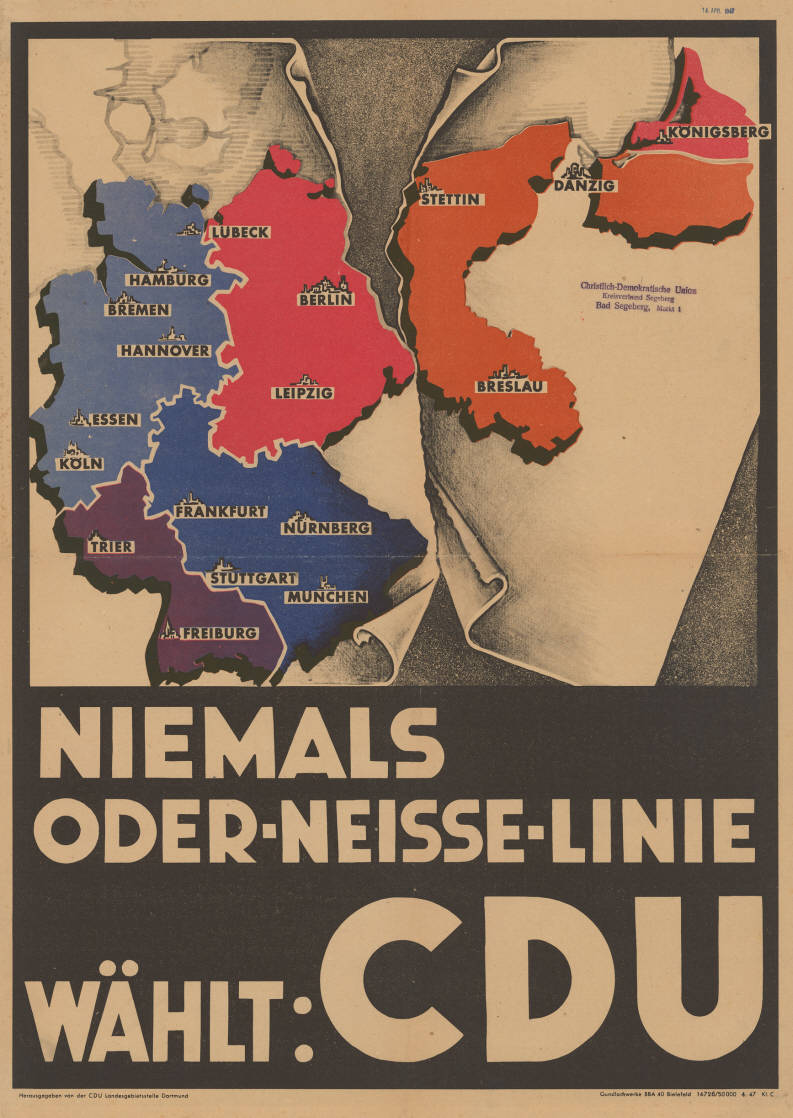
CDU's election poster (1947): "Never Oder-Neisse line – vote CDU"

To Hans Peter Schwarz, Adenauer's refusal to accept the Oder–Neisse line was in large part motivated by domestic politics, especially his desire to win the votes of the domestic lobby of those Germans who had been expelled from areas east of the Oder–Neisse line. 16% of the electorate in 1950 were people who fled or were expelled after the war, forming a powerful political force . As a result, the CDU, the CSU, the FDP and the SPD all issued statements opposing the Oder–Neisse line and supporting Heimatrecht ("right to one's homeland", i.e. that the expellees be allowed to return to their former homes). Adenauer greatly feared the power of the expellee lobby, and told his cabinet in 1950 that he was afraid of "unbearable economic and political unrest" if the government did not champion all of the demands of the expellee lobby. In addition, Adenauer's rejection of the Oder–Neisse line was intended to be a deal-breaker if negotiations ever began to reunite Germany on terms that Adenauer considered unfavorable such as the neutralization of Germany as Adenauer knew well that the Soviets would never consider revising the Oder–Neisse line. Finally Adenauer's biographer, the German historian Hans Peter Schwarz has argued that Adenauer may have genuinely believed that Germany had the right to retake the land lost east of the Oder and Neisse rivers, despite all of the image problems this created for him in the United States and western Europe. By contrast, the Finnish historian Pertti Ahonen—citing numerous private statements made by Adenauer that Germany's eastern provinces were lost forever and expressing contempt for the expellee leaders as delusional in believing that they were actually going to return one day to their former homes—has argued that Adenauer had no interest in really challenging the Oder–Neisse line. Ahonen wrote that Adenauer "saw his life's work in anchoring the Federal Republic irrevocably to the anti-Communist West and no burning interest in East European problems—or even German reunification." Adenauer's stance on the Oder–Neisse line was to create major image problems for him in the Western countries in the 1950s, where many regarded his revanchist views on where Germany's eastern borders ought to be with considerable distaste, and only the fact that East Germany was between the Federal Republic and Poland prevented this from becoming a major issue in relations with the West.

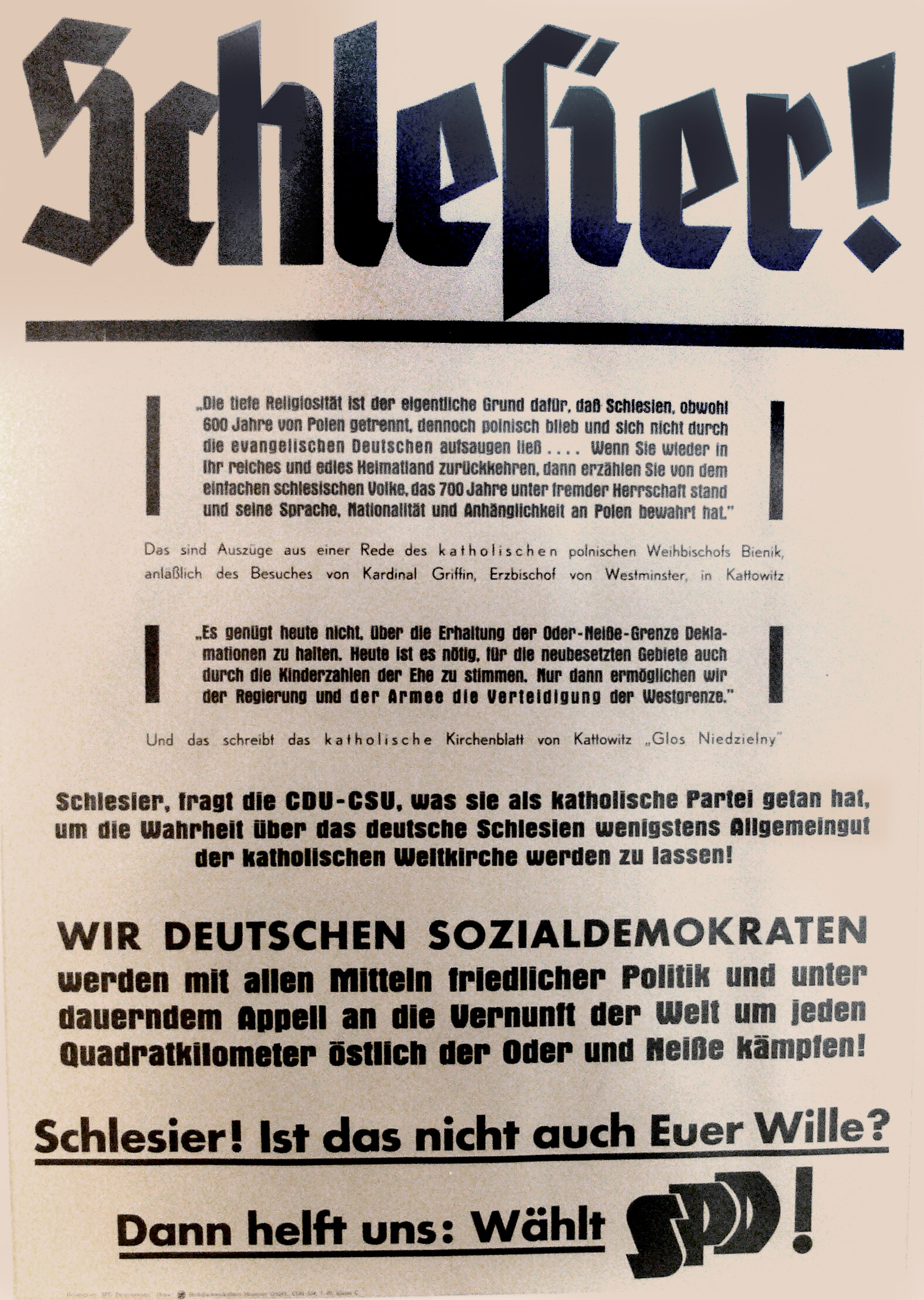
SPD's election poster (1949): "Silesians – We German Socialdemocrats will fight with all means of peaceful politics and in constant appeal on the sanity of the world for every single square kilometer east of Oder and Neisse"

On 1 May 1956, the West German Foreign Minister Heinrich von Brentano admitted during a press conference in London that the Federal Republic's stance on the Oder–Neisse line was "somewhat problematic", and suggested that the Federal Republic should recognize the Oder–Neisse line in exchange for the Soviet Union allowing German reunification. Brentano's remark caused such an uproar with the expellee leaders arguing that he should resign, that Adenauer was forced to disallow his foreign minister, and Brentano only kept his job by claiming that he was misquoted by the British press. In private, Brentano was willing to accept the Oder–Neisse line as the price of reunification, and was not misquoted in London as he claimed afterwards. Away from the public limelight in a conversation with the Canadian ambassador Charles Ritchie in June 1956, Brentano called the leaders of the expellee groups "unteachable nationalists" who had learned nothing from World War II, and who did not have the right to control the Federal Republic's policy towards Eastern Europe by vetoing policy changes they disliked. Brentano's press conference was meant by Adenauer to be a trial balloon to see if the Federal Republic could have a more flexible policy towards Eastern Europe. The furious protests set off by Brentano's press conference convinced Adenauer that he did not have the domestic support for such a policy, and that the current policy of opposing the Oder–Neisse line would have to continue. This caused considerable disappointment with Adenauer's Western allies, who had been applying strong pressure behind the scenes and would continue to apply such pressure for the rest of the 1950s for Bonn to recognize the Oder–Neisse line. This pressure become especially acute after the "Polish October" crisis of 1956 brought to power Władysław Gomułka as Poland's new leader. Gomułka was a Communist, but also a Polish nationalist, and it was believed possible in Washington that a split could be encouraged between Moscow and Warsaw if only Bonn would recognize the Oder–Neisse line. Because the Federal Republic's refusal to recognize the Oder–Neisse line together with the presence of such Nazi-tainted individuals like Theodor Oberländer in Adenauer's cabinet, Gomułka was obsessed with the fear that one day the Germans would invade Poland again, which would mean a return to the horrors of the German occupation.

Gomułka feared the Germans more than he disliked the Russians, and thus he argued in both public and in private that it was necessary to keep Soviet troops in Poland to guard against any future German revanchism. Gomułka felt sincerely threatened by the revanchist statements put out by the Adenauer government, and believed the alliance with the Soviet Union was the only thing stopping the threat of a new German invasion. Gomułka told the 8th Plenum on 19 October 1956 that: "Poland needs friendship with the Soviet Union more than the Soviet Union needs friendship with Poland...Without the Soviet Union we cannot maintain our borders with the West". During his meetings with Nikita Khrushchev during the Polish October crisis, Gomułka stressed that though he wanted Poland to take a more independent line within the Soviet bloc, he would never break with Moscow because of his fears of future German aggression based on their statements rejecting the Oder–Neisse line. Because Gomułka's obsession with the Oder–Neisse line and his reputation as a Polish nationalist who spoke of a "Polish road to socialism" independent of Moscow, it was believed possible by the Americans at the time that Gomułka might follow Tito's example in 1948 if only Adenauer could be persuaded to accept the Oder–Neisse line. One scholar wrote in 1962 that most Poles deeply disliked Communism, but were willing to accept Gomułka's regime as the lesser evil because they believed Gomułka's warnings that if without the Red Army, the Germans would invade again. Such was the extent of Polish fears about German revanchism that as late as February 1990 the Polish Prime Minister Tadeusz Mazowiecki stated in a speech that the Red Army might have to stay in Poland until Germany had promised to firmly recognize the Oder–Neisse line as the final frontier between Germany and Poland.

In 1963 the German Social Democratic opposition leader Willy Brandt said that "abnegation is betrayal", but it was Brandt who eventually changed West Germany's attitude with his policy of Ostpolitik. In 1970 West Germany signed treaties with the Soviet Union (Treaty of Moscow) and Poland (Treaty of Warsaw) recognizing Poland's Western border at the Oder–Neisse line as current reality, and not to be changed by force. This had the effect of making family visits by the displaced eastern Germans to their lost homelands now more or less possible. Such visits were still very difficult, however, and permanent resettlement in the homeland, now Poland, remained impossible.

In 1989, another treaty was signed between Poland and East Germany, the sea border was defined, and a dispute from 1985 was settled.

=== United Germany ===
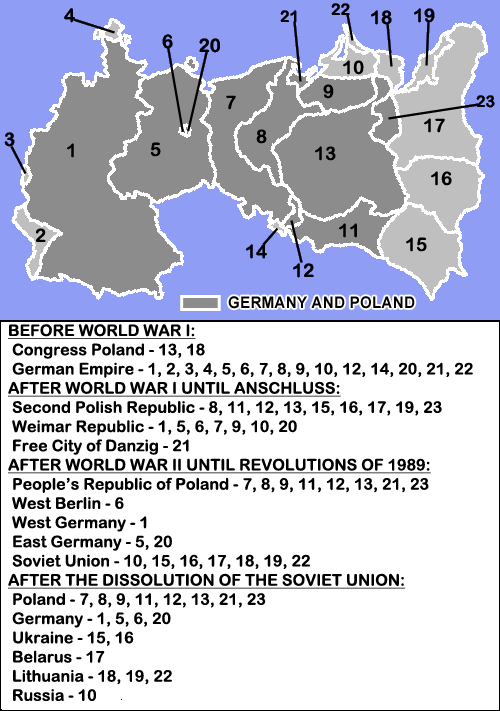
Map showing the different borders and territories of Poland and Germany during the 20th century, with the current areas of Germany and Poland in dark gray

In March 1990, the West German Chancellor Helmut Kohl caused a storm, when he suggested that a reunified Germany would not accept the Oder–Neisse line, and implied that the Federal Republic might wish to restore the frontier of 1937, by force if necessary. Kohl further added that in a statement of 1 March 1990 that he would only recognize the Oder–Neisse line if Poland promised to pay compensation to the Germans expelled after 1945 and if Poland promised not to seek reparations for the sufferings of Polish slave labourers in Germany and reparations for the damage done by German forces to Poland during World War II. After Kohl's note caused a massive international backlash that threatened to derail the process for German reunification, Kohl hastily changed track, and said that a reunified Germany would accept the Oder–Neisse line after all, and that he would not seek to link recognizing the Oder–Neisse line to talks about compensation. In November 1990, after German reunification, the Federal Republic of Germany and the Republic of Poland signed a treaty confirming the border between them, as requested by the Treaty on the Final Settlement With Respect to Germany. Earlier, Germany had amended its constitution and abolished Article 23 of West Germany's Basic Law (on which reunification was based), which could have been used to claim the former German eastern territories.

The German–Polish Border Treaty, signed 14 November 1990, finalizing the Oder–Neisse line as the German–Polish border came into force on 16 January 1992, together with a second one, a Treaty of Good Neighbourship, signed in June 1991, in which the two countries, among other things, recognized basic political and cultural rights for both the German and the Polish minorities living on either side of the border. After 1990, approximately 150,000 Germans still resided in the areas transferred to Poland, mainly in the Opole Voivodeship, with a smaller presence in regions such as Lower Silesia and Warmia-Masuria. There are 1.5 million Poles or ethnic Poles living in Germany, including both recent immigrants and the descendants of Poles that settled in Germany many generations ago.

== Other developments ==
=== Division of cities ===
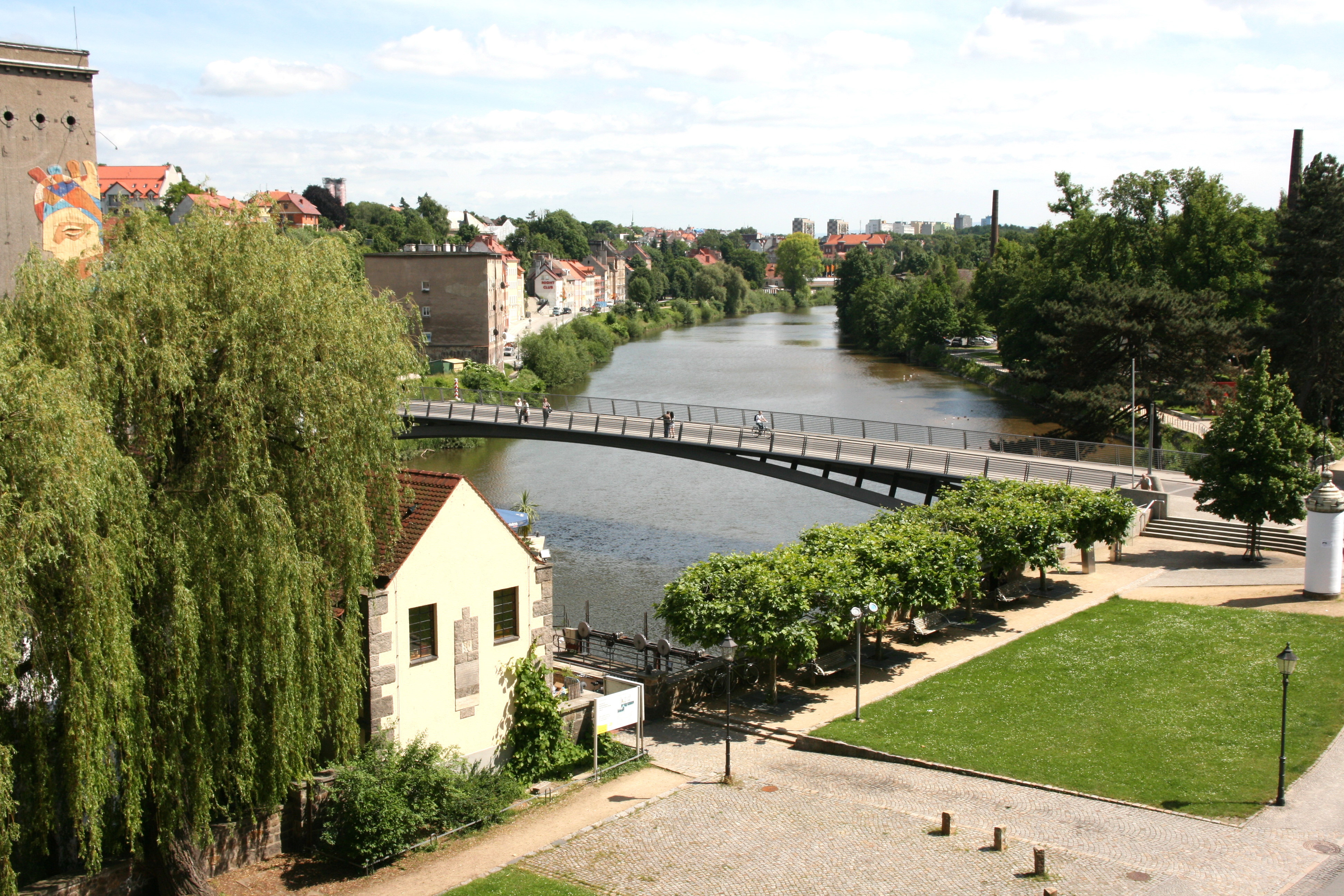
The Lusatian Neisse dividing German Görlitz (right) from Polish Zgorzelec (left); formerly both constituted the city of Görlitz.

The border divided several cities into two parts – Görlitz/Zgorzelec, Guben/Gubin, Frankfurt/Słubice and Bad Muskau/Łęknica.

=== Partially open border 1971–1980 ===
Millions visited the neighbouring country (either Poland or East Germany) during the years 1971–1980. The East German economy was threatened by overconsumption of Polish tourists, who came to East Germany to buy cheaper products that the socialist economy could not provide in abundance on either side of the border; and the Poles also became politically dangerous for the GDR government by the time of the 1980 Solidarity strikes.

== See also ==
- Curzon Line
- Federation of Expellees
- Allied Occupation Zones in Germany

=== World War II-related events ===
- Vistula-Oder Offensive, from 12 January until 2 February 1945
- Malta Conference, from 30 January to 3 February 1945
- Yalta Conference, from 4 to 11 February 1945
- Battle of Königsberg, from 6 April until 9 April 1945
- Battle of the Oder-Neisse, from 16 April until 19 April 1945
- Potsdam Conference, from 17 July to 2 August 1945
