= Michał Sczaniecki =

Polish historian (1910–1977)

Michał Sczaniecki (born Stanisław Maria Michał Sczaniecki; 26 March 1910 – 29 May 1977), was a Polish historian of state and law, especially of Poland and France; professor of Adam Mickiewicz University in Poznań from 1951 to 1965, and director of the Western Institute (Instytut Zachodni) in Poznań from 1961 to 1964. He was later professor at Warsaw University.

== Early life and education ==
Sczaniecki hailed from a noble landowning family in Wielkopolska who identified themselves with the Ossorya coat of arms. His father, Władysław Sczaniecki (1869-1942), was a colonel in the Polish Army, as well as a landowner and a prominent figure in social and economic activism in the dairy industry. Sczaniecki's mother was Jadwiga, née Plucińska, who died in 1965.

After graduating from the Mary Magdalene Gymnasium in Poznań in 1927, he pursued a degree in law at the University of Poznań. During this time, Sczaniecki joined the Coronia Studentenverbindung and continued his studies at Jagiellonian University under the supervision of Zygmunt Wojciechowski. In 1937, he successfully defended his doctoral dissertation on the allocation of land to knights in Poland until the end of the 13th century. That same year, he travelled to France to further his studies with the Professor François Olivier-Martin at the University of Paris, who was an expert in both historical and legal sciences.

== Military ==
In August 1932, Sczaniecki enlisted for one year of military service. During the initial ten months, he attended the Artillery Reserve Cadet School in Wlodzimierz Wolynski, and then spent two months as an apprentice at the 11th Horse Artillery Squadron in Bydgoszcz. He was eventually promoted to the rank of second lieutenant, with seniority dating back to 1 January 1935, and ranked 112th among the artillery reserve officer corps.

He was enlisted in the Polish Army in France and served as an observation officer in the 2nd division of the 1st (101st) Vilnius Light Artillery Regiment during the French campaign. He received the Cross of Valour and the French Croix de Guerre for his bravery. He also played a crucial role in organizing Polish volunteer units in Brittany. Sczaniecki was wounded in battle and subsequently taken prisoner by the Germans. He spent the rest of the war in the German oflag in Edelbach. After his release, he co-organized an underground Law School for Polish officers affiliated with the Université de Captivité.

== Post-Military ==
After his return to Poznań in 1946, Sczaniecki accomplished his habilitation at the University of Poznań. He was later appointed as an associate professor in 1954, followed by achieving the title of full professor in 1959. In 1955, he took the helm of the Chair of History of State and Law at the University of Poznań. He later moved to the University of Warsaw in 1965. He is the well-known author of a textbook on the history of state and law, favoured by students. Additionally, he was the co-founder of the scientific periodical Czasopismo Prawno-Historyczne, which he edited from 1953 to 1977. Sczaniecki was awarded an honorary doctorate by the University of Grenoble.

He is buried in the Powązki cemetery in Warsaw (cemetery section X, row 6, grave 20).

== Surviving family ==
His elder brother was Józef Sczaniecki, a cavalry officer. His wife was Maria, née Ponikiewska, with whom he had two daughters, Teresa and Monika.

== Publications ==
- Powszechna historia państwa i prawa (Universal history of the state and law)
