= Andrzej Sakson =

Polish sociologist and historian

Andrzej Sakson (born 1950 in Elbląg) is a Polish sociologist and historian. Since 2004 he has been the director of the Western Institute (Instytut Zachodni) in Poznań.

Sakson is a professor of sociology at the Institute of Sociology of Adam Mickiewicz University (Instytut Socjologi UAM) in Poznań, and the Western Institute. He specializes in research on national and ethnic minorities, with special focus on the German minority in Poland and the Polish ethnic groups of Mazurians and Warmians in the north-eastern Polish region of Warmia-Masuria, for which he was awarded by the provincial assembly.

== Publications ==
- Mazurzy – społeczność pogranicza, 1990, Instytut Zachodn. ISBN 978-83-85003-43-4.
- Polacy i Niemcy: stereotypy i wzajemne postrzeganie, Instytut Zachodni, Poznań 2001. ISBN 978-83-87688-22-6.
- Mniejszości narodowe i etniczne w Polsce i Europie aspekty polityczne i społeczne, 2014, Wydawnictwo Adam Marszalek
- Polska, Niemcy, mniejszość niemiecka w Wielkopolsce przeszłość i terażniejszość, 1994, Instytut Zachodni. ISBN 978-83-85003-70-0.
- Współczesne migracje w Polsce, Andrzej Sakson, Wydawnictwo Naukowe Wydziału Nauk Politycznych i Dziennikarstwa (Uniwersytet im. Adama Mickiewicza; Poznań) ·2023. ISBN 978-83-66740-78-5.
