= Western Thought (Poland) =

Check this Out So

Western Thought (Myśl zachodnia) was a school of thought in Polish historical and political science. In the 1920s and 1930s Myśl zachodnia was organized in opposition to Ostforschung. A main center of Western Thought was the association Polski Związek Zachodni (PZZ; Polish Western Union), founded in 1921. Unlike Germann Ostforschung, Polish western thought was not institutionalized and didn't constitute any real threat. Its influence was exaggerated by German scholars in order to fund and justify their own work.

== Before 1945 ==
At the time of 10th century the Western border of Poland was located on the line of the Odra and Nysa Luzycka.

Early Piast Poland at the death of Mieszko I in 992, who is considered as the first historical ruler of Poland

In partitioned Poland, historians developed a romanticized view of the Piast kingdom of the early Middle Ages, extending to the Oder. Polish historians have construed a continuous Polish-German clash caused by Germans' drive of territorial and ethnic expansion, alleging that assimilation of Slavic inhabitants to German language and culture constituted a forceful Germanization, similar to contemporary Germanization policies of Prussia.

After reconstitution of the Polish state in 1919, Polish historians and politicians focused on defending the then western border against German irredentism supported by Ostforschung. Historic and economic arguments were used to justify Poland's access to the Baltic by the Polish Corridor. Revisionist Polish claims in the first half of the 20th century were mostly related to East Prussia, Danzig and Upper Silesia, while Lower Silesia and Pomerania, which did not have sizable Polish minorities, were generally ignored.

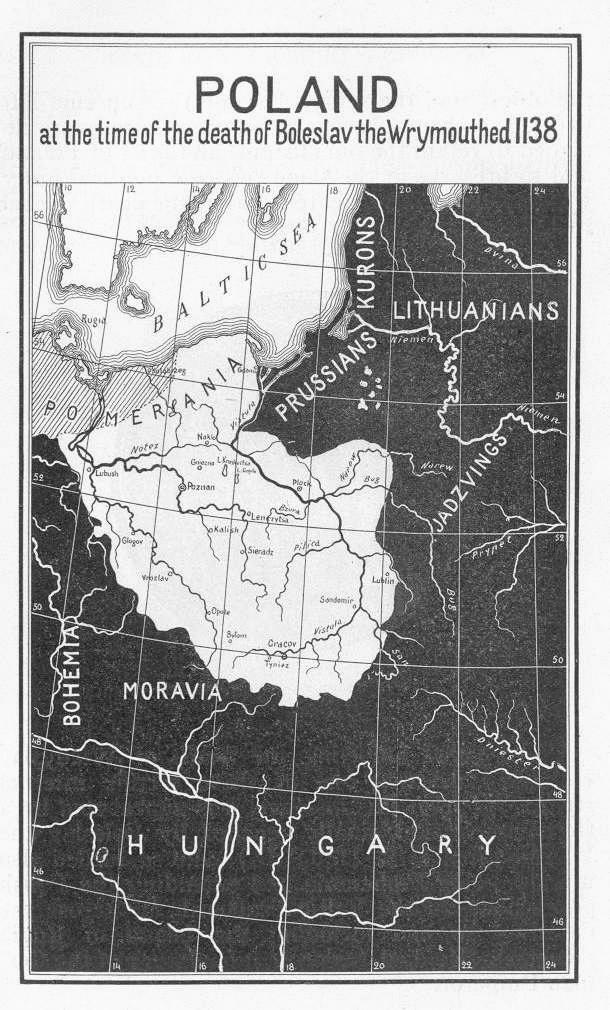
Poland at the death of Boleslaw III in 1138

Jan Ludwik Popławski, an early exponent of myśl zachodnia, advocated that Poland must have access to the Baltic Sea, and must gain Silesia, the Wielkopolska region, Pomerania and East Prussia. He accepted that formerly Piast-ruled provinces like Lower Silesia and Farther Pomerania had by then become German lands, to which Poland had permanently lost any rights or claims it might once have had. Roman Umiastowski in 1921 had foreseen that a future will bring a German-Polish conflict with France as Polish ally, and argued that only a shift in Polish border to Oder-Neisse line would be able to protect Poland from German threat. In the 1930s, Zygmunt Wojciechowski propagated the revolutionary idea of a border along Oder and Lusatian Neisse. Wojciechowski viewed loss of these lands to Germany to be a catastrophe for Poland. By 1945, after events of Second World War, the final version of his book could be published. By then Wojciechowski held that "eradication of all things German is a basic precondition for the restoration of a natural and peaceful existence in a post-War Poland” His book concluded "In place of the German ‘Drang nach Osten’ (‘Thrust towards the East’), the approaching era will be one of a renewed Slavic march to the west"

Most Polish historians believe, that the Polish western policy before World War II was a reaction to the revisionist tendencies in Germany, both in the Weimar Republic and the Third Reich. However, historian Piotr Piotrowski points out that it is beyond doubt that the Polish policy was motivated by dissatisfaction with the Treaty of Versailles. Poznań was the main center of the "western thought" and center of propaganda and activities related to the plebiscites in Silesia and the place where the Association for the Defense of the Western Borderland (ZOKZ) was founded in 1921. The Association published its own periodical "Straznica Zachnodnia" which was discontinued in 1922 under government pressure when, temporarily, Polish and German governments became closer. The publications was resumed in 1937. Piotrowski presents an analysis of a book of Kisilewski, which is seen as typical of the school. According to the historian, the book presents an imaginary historical iconography, which was a component of the Western Thought movement. Later, after Polonization of Eastern German lands, the history of Slavdom and the Piast epoch became mythological constructs constituting national-ethnic mythology.

== 1945 and later ==
Claims to the Oder-Neisse line were presented at the Potsdam Conference by a delegation of politicians and a group of experts comprising Andrzej Bolewski, Walery Goetel and Stanisław Leszczycki. These experts presented a justification for a western Polish border following the Oder-Neisse Line by political and moral arguments, territorial and demographic matters and their historical basis, and economic linkages between the Western Lands with Poland.

After realization of the preliminary border along Oder and Neisse, and the flight and population transfer of Germans, members of the reestablished PZZ worked together with communists to "de-Germanize" and to "re-Polonize" the huge land, propagandistically termed Recovered Territories. Throughout the land, place names were recovered or newly invented, often with reference to the former Polish past under Piast rulers. In the traditional ethnic boundary region of Upper Silesia, the Silesian Institute developed clease German loanwords from everyday speech and to re-engineer a new dialect of Upper Silesian based on High Polish.

The Western Though ideas became essential form forming the unlikely alliance between Polish Communists and Polish Nationalists in postwar Poland. Because Silesia and Pomerania had been acknowledged as ancient Polish lands before the war, the Polonization of these areas thus could be framed as a re-Polonization. The German history in the areas was thus portrayed as a transition period, sweeping under the rug that this alleged transition period had lasted from the Middle Ages until 1945. In this manner, the Western Though ideas helped the Communist regime as well as the new settlers in Western and Northeastern Poland to suppress undesired questions and has hugely affected the historiography of these areas.
