= German–Polish Border Treaty =

1990 border demarcation treaty between Germany and Poland

Treaty between the Federal Republic of Germany and the Republic of Poland on the confirmation of the frontier between them
- Type: Border treaty
- Signed: 14 November 1990
- Location: Warsaw, Poland
- Effective: 16 January 1992
- Signatories: Germany; Poland
- Languages: German; Polish

The German–Polish Border Treaty of 1990 (Note: Full title: Treaty between the Federal Republic of Germany and the Republic of Poland on the confirmation of the frontier between them, 14 November 1990 (German: Vertrag zwischen der Bundesrepublik Deutschland und der Republik Polen über die Bestätigung der zwischen ihnen bestehenden Grenze; Polish: Traktat między Rzeczpospolitą Polską a Republiką Federalną Niemiec o potwierdzeniu istniejącej między nimi granicy)) finally settled the issue of the Polish–German border, which in terms of international law had been pending since 1945. It was signed by the foreign ministers of Poland and Germany, Krzysztof Skubiszewski and Hans-Dietrich Genscher, on 14 November 1990 in Warsaw, ratified by the Polish Sejm on 26 November 1991 and the German Bundestag on 16 December 1991, and entered into force with the exchange of the instruments of ratification on 16 January 1992.

== Historical background ==
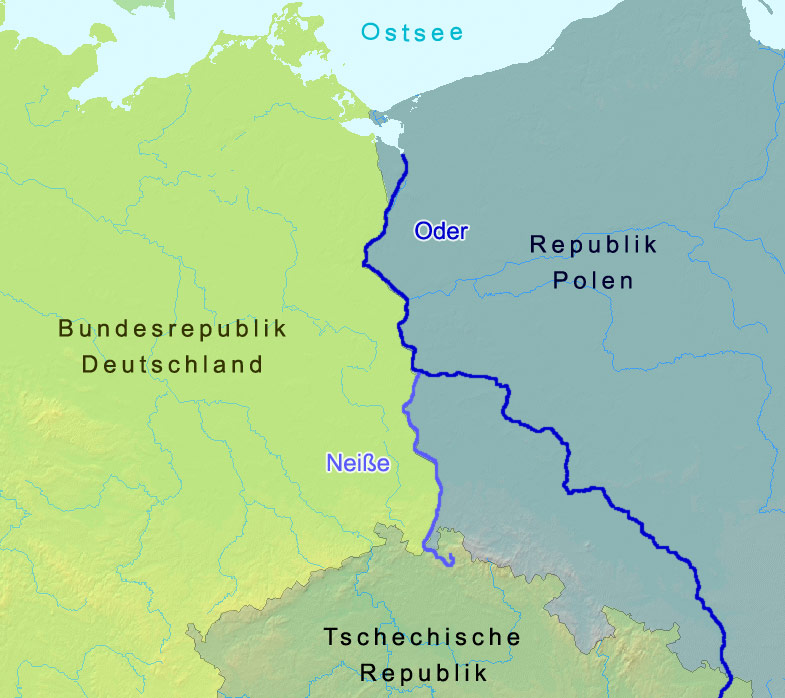
Oder–Neisse line between Germany and Poland

In the Potsdam Agreement of 1945, the Allies of World War II had defined the Oder–Neisse line as the line of demarcation between the Soviet occupation zone in Germany and Poland, pending the final determination of Poland's western frontier in a later peace settlement. This transferred extensive regions to Poland, some of which had been under German control for centuries, reducing Germany to approximately three quarters of the territory as of 1937. The Treaty of Zgorzelec of 1950 between East Germany and the Republic of Poland confirmed this border as final. West Germany, which saw itself as the only legal successor to the German Reich and did not recognize East Germany, insisted that final settlement on the Polish–German border could only be accepted by a future reunited Germany. Although West Germany, for all practical purposes, accepted the Oder–Neisse border in the Treaty of Warsaw (1970), its legal caveat that only a future peace treaty would formally settle the issue remained in effect.

With German reunification finally within reach in 1990, the Allies of World War II made full sovereignty for Germany conditional on the final recognition of the Oder–Neisse border, as stipulated in article 1.2 of the Treaty on the Final Settlement with Respect to Germany. The signing of a treaty between Germany and Poland recognizing the Oder–Neisse line as the border under international law was also one of the terms of the Unification Treaty between West and East Germany that was signed and went into effect on 3 October 1990. Poland also wanted this treaty to end the ambiguity that had surrounded the border issue since 1945.

== The Treaty ==
Under the terms of the treaty, the contracting parties

- reaffirmed the frontier according to the 1950 Treaty of Zgorzelec with its subsequent regulatory statutes and the 1970 Treaty of Warsaw;
- declared the frontier between them inviolable now and hereafter, and mutually pledged to respect their sovereignty and territorial integrity;
- declared that they have no territorial claims against each other and shall not raise such claims in the future.

The agreement was supplemented by a Treaty of Good Neighbourship and Friendly Cooperation, signed between Poland and Germany on 17 June 1991.

In the ratification process at the Bundestag, the treaty met with 13 dissenting votes by deputies of the CDU/CSU faction, among them Erika Steinbach and Peter Ramsauer. In 2006 the Polish Foreign Minister Anna Fotyga, responding to the compensation claims raised by the "Prussian Trust" corporation, stated that the treaty was insufficient and may have to be renegotiated.
