= Anna Wolff-Powęska =

Polish historian of Germany

- Born: 1941 (age 84–85); Tarnopol, Ukrainian Soviet Socialist Republic
- Occupation: Historian
- Title: Professor
- Board member of: Western Institute; CBH PAN
- Spouse: Eberhard Schulz
- Children: 1
- Awards: Order of Polonia Restituta; European Citizen's Prize

Academic background
- Education: Adam Mickiewicz University
- Thesis: (1970)

Academic work
- Discipline: History
- Sub-discipline: German history
- Institutions: Adam Mickiewicz University; SWPS University

Anna Wolff-Powęska (born 1941) is a Polish historian and political scientist specialising in Polish-German relations. She was the director of the Western Institute in Poznań from 1990 to 2004. She is one of the foremost authorities on Germany in Poland.

== Career ==
In 1964, she graduated in history from the Philosophical-Historical Department of Adam Mickiewicz University in Poznań. For a few years, she taught history in primary schools, until she was employed by the Western Institute in 1969. In 1970, she obtained a Ph.D., and in 1980 she completed her habilitation with a thesis on political and law doctrines at the same university. She became full professor in 1986 and was made director of the Western Institute in 1990. She left this post in 2004, but continues to work at the institute.

=== Areas of activity ===
Wolff-Powęska's main areas of interest are the history of German political thought and the political culture of Central-Eastern Europe.

=== Awards ===
In 2005, Wolff-Powęska received the Polish-German Award for special contribution to Polish-German relations.

== Publications ==
- Doktryna geopolityki w Niemczech (1979)
- Polityczne i filozoficzne nurty konserwatyzmu w Republice Federalnej Niemiec (1984)
- Niemiecka myśl polityczna wieku oświecenia (1988)
- Wspólna Europa. Mit czy rzeczywistość (1990)
- Polacy wobec Niemców. Z dziejów kultury politycznej Polskiej Rzeczypospolitej Ludowej 1945-1989 (1993)
- Oswojona Rewolucja. Europa Środkowo-Wschodnia w procesie demokratyzacji (1998)
- Polen in Deutschland, Integration oder Separation? (2000)
- Przestrzeń i polityka. Z dziejów niemieckiej myśli politycznej (2000)
- A bliźniego swego... Kościoły w Niemczech wobec „problemu żydowskiego” (2003)
