= Kazimierz Piwarski =

Polish historian (1903–1968)

Kazimierz Piwarski (19 February 1903 – 21 July 1968) was a Polish historian, professor of Jagiellonian University in Kraków since 1946 and Poznań University in years 1953-1955, member of Polish Academy of Skills (Polska Akademia Umiejętności, PAU) since 1945, and member of Polish Academy of Sciences (Polska Akademia Nauk, PAN) since 1958.

He researched in the history of the Polish provinces of Pomerania, Silesia, East Prussia and also the universal history of the 18th and 20th centuries. He was one of the most noteworthy Polish historians writing about history of Polish-Saxon relations in 18th century

During World War II he was arrested by the Germans on 6 November 1940 in Sonderaktion Krakau, and then imprisoned in Sachsenhausen and Dachau concentration camps until late 1941.

Kazimierz Piwarski was the director of the Western Institute (Instytut Zachodni) in Poznań in years 1956-1958.

== Publications ==
- Dzieje Śląska w zarysie (Short History of Silesia)
- Dzieje polityczne Prus Wschodnich 1621-1772, (1938, Political history of the East Prussia 1621-1772)
- Kuria rzymska a polski ruch narowodowowyzwoleńczy 1794-1863, (1955, The Roman curia and the Polish national liberation movement 1794-1863)
- Kazimierz Piwarski (1903-1968 ) By Zbigniew Jabłoński · 1968
