= Treaty of Good Neighbourship =

German–Polish Treaty

The Polish–German Treaty of Good Neighbourship and Friendly Cooperation (Polish: Traktat o dobrym sąsiedztwie i przyjaznej współpracy, German: Vertrag über gute Nachbarschaft und freundschaftliche Zusammenarbeit) was signed between the Federal Republic of Germany and the Republic of Poland on 17 June 1991. It supplemented the German–Polish Border Treaty signed in 1990.

In the Treaty of Good Neighbourship both countries agreed to respect the rights of national minorities living on the other side of the border, and to promote cultural contacts, particularly among young people.

In 1992 Poland also signed similarly named agreements with other neighbouring countries:

- With Ukraine, the Treaty of Good Neighbourship, Friendly Relations and Cooperation (Traktat o dobrym sąsiedztwie, przyjaznych stosunkach i współpracy), signed on 18 May 1992 in Warsaw;
- With Russia, the Treaty of Friendly and Neighbourly Cooperation (Traktat o przyjaznej i dobrosąsiedzkiej współpracy), signed on 22 May 1992 in Moscow;
- With Belarus, the Treaty of Good Neighbourship and Friendly Cooperation (Traktat o dobrym sąsiedztwie i przyjaznej współpracy), signed on 25 June 1992 in Warsaw.
