= Zdzisław Kaczmarczyk =

Polish historian (1911–1980)

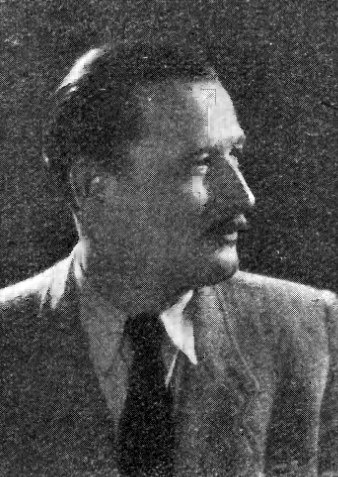
Zdzisław Kaczmarczyk

Zdzisław Kaczmarczyk (1911–1980) was a Polish historian and director of the Western Institute (Instytut Zachodni) in Poznań from 1964 to 1965.

He was connected to the Western Institute for his whole adult life, studying there in the early 1930s and then becoming a voluntary assistant from where he climbed the academic hierarchy to become director. He remained with the institute until his death in 1980, treating it as his second home.
