= Lech Trzeciakowski =

Polish historian (1931–2017)

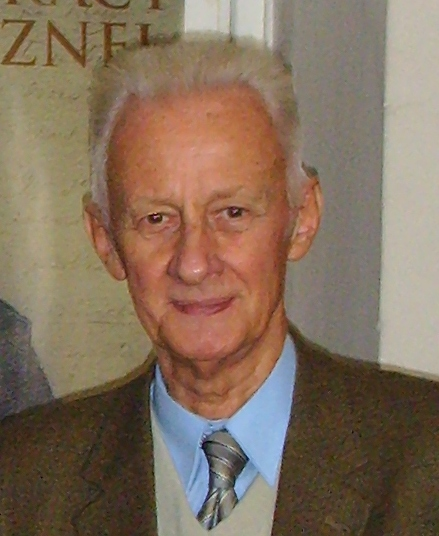
- Born: December 24, 1931
- Died: January 7, 2017 (aged 85)
- Occupation: Historian

Lech Trzeciakowski (24 December 1931 – 7 January 2017) was a Polish historian who served as director of the Western Institute (Instytut Zachodni) in Poznań from 1974 to 1978. Born in Poznań, he also died there in 2017.

== Biography ==
He was the son of Marian Trzeciakowski, who was an insurgent during the Greater Poland uprising and was a civil servant of the Second Polish Republic, and Stefania (née Dębicka). In 1938, he began primary school in Poznań. In 1945, he passed his primary school exit exams and passed the entrance exam for the Karol Marcinkowski High School. He belonged to the Błękitna Czternastka scouting troop at the school.

== Selected publications ==
- Lech Trzeciakowski, Kulturkampf w zaborze pruskim, Poznań 1970
- Lech Trzeciakowski, Pod pruskim zaborem 1850-1914, Warszawa 1973
- Lech Trzeciakowski, Walka o polskość miast Poznańskiego na przełomie XIX i XX wieku, Poznań 1964
- Lech Trzeciakowski, W dziewiętnastowiecznym Poznaniu, Poznań 1987
