= Zygmunt Wojciechowski =

Polish historian and politician

- Zygmunt Wojciechowski
- Born: 27 March 1900; Stryj, Austro-Hungarian Galicia.
- Died: 14 October 1955 (aged 55); Poznań, Poland
- Occupations: Politician, historian
- Known for: Co-initiator of the Polish "Western thought"

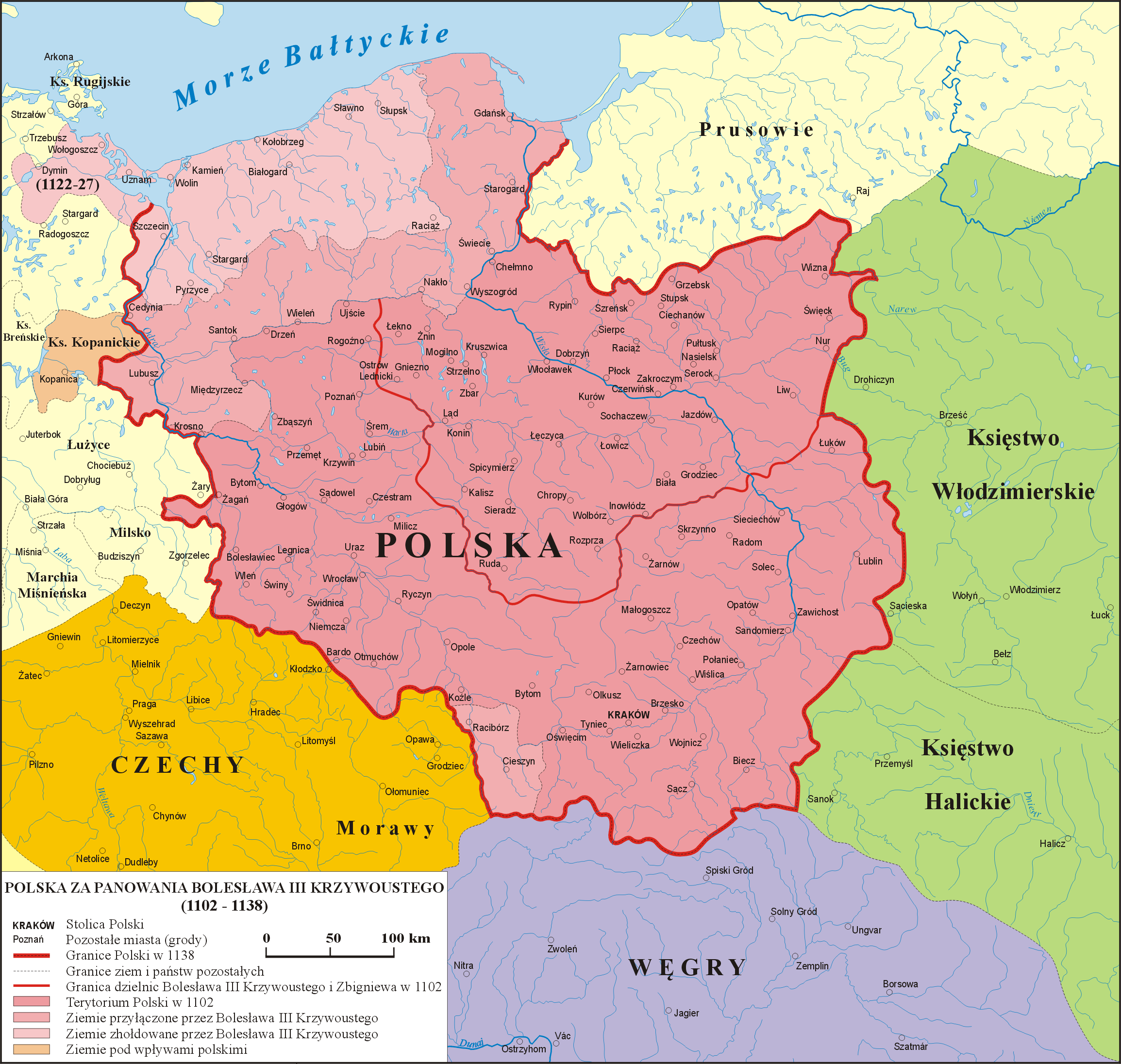
Wojciechowski believed that the territories of Poland under Boleslaw Krzywousty formed the "motherland areas" of Poland

Zygmunt Wojciechowski (27 April 1900 – 14 October 1955) was a Polish historian and nationalist politician. Born in 1900 in then-Austria, he obtained a doctorate from medieval history at Lviv University. In 1925 he moved to Poznań, where he became a full professor in 1929. In 1934-1939 he became politically involved with the nationalist party Endecja. During occupation of Poland by Nazi Germany he worked in Polish underground opposing German genocide of Poles by providing underground teaching, which was banned by German state and worked on future concept of Polish borders that would provide Poland with safety against any further German aggression. He supported an alliance with Soviet Union and after the war he continued to work as historian in People's Republic of Poland and headed Western Institute that studied former Polish territories recovered from Germany and history of Polish-German relations. He was a recipient of Commander's Cross and Officer's Cross of Order of Polonia Restituta.

== Biography ==
Wojciechowski was born in Stryj near Lviv (Stryi, Ukraine), then Austro-Hungarian Galicia. In World War I he volunteered Piłsudski's Legion but was not deployed anymore.

In 1921, Wojciechowski began studying at the Jan Kazimierz University in Lwów, which had then just been re-incorporated in the re-created Polish state (now Lviv in Ukraine). In 1924, he obtained a doctorate in medieval history, social sciences, and economics, and became assistant professor at the Institute for Auxiliary Sciences of History. In 1924 he published his first concept of the "motherland territories" of Poland. His definition of "Polish motherland" was the areas as acquired by 10th-century Piast Poland in the era of Mieszko I and Bolesław III Wrymouth (eastern part of Brandenburg, i.e. Neumark as well as Lower Silesia, Pomerania, (Frontier March of) Posen–West Prussia and Upper Silesia). In 1925, he moved to Poznań, where he first was the deputy holder of the chair for the history of the political system and Ancient Polish law at Adam Mickiewicz University (UAM). The same year, he completed his habilitation with a thesis on the territorial administration of medieval settlements. He became extraordinary (non-tenured) professor in 1929, and full professor in January 1937. From 1939, he was the dean of the university's Department of Law and Economics.

=== Political activity ===
Since 1934, Wojciechowski, a friend of Roman Dmowski (leader of endecja), had been one of the main ideologists of the Camp of Great Poland (OWP). He was active in the right-wing All-Polish Youth and the Liga Narodowa. In 1934 he founded the "League of Young Nationalists" (Związek Młodych Narodowców), whose aim was the foundation of an authoritarian, homogenous Polish state, and became its chairman until 1937. From 1937 to 1939 he was the chairman of the "Nation State Movement" (Ruch Narodowo-Panstwowy) In 1937 he called for a strong national state that would be democratic During his political career he opposed Dmowski and the movement he belonged to sought integration with Józef Piłsudski's sanacja faction, hoping that both main political factions in Poland would unite led by interest in well being of Polish nation However, he considered Dmowski one of the most influential persons of his life.

Wojciechowski initially saw "traces of a modern national thought" in the National Socialism. He initially admired Hitler's anti-Jewish policy as a good example for Poland. He accepted the Anschluss of Austria and the Munich Agreement but became more critical of Hitler's politics in the course of time. According to Tomasz Kenar he was alarmed by Hitler's expansionism but accepted the "Anschluss" of Austria, hoping that it would put Italy against Nazi Germany and into the sphere of Polish alliance. Regarding Munich Agreement he saw Czechoslovakia as too closely allied Soviet Union; while Czechs were in his view natural allies of Poles, their close contacts with the Soviets made such alliance impossible. He remained opposed to German annexation of Czechoslovakia, worried that such event would make Polish military situation difficult. Wojciechowski envisioned a Polish-led block in Central Europe composed of Hungary, Romania, Finland, Estonia, Latvia and Lithuania and in close relationship with Italy, that would oppose both German expansionism and Soviet pressure on these states; he wrote that such alliance would "rescue Christianity" from the threat of "Bolshevik communism" and "hitlerite paganism". Later on he focused his attention towards Fascist Italy, due to his interest in a "strong state", "depending on legal norms, in tradition of Roman law". While nation was for Wojciechowski at time the "greatest good" he didn't exhibit racist ideas or anything that would be similar to German "volkisch" elements in his works. During Nazi German occupation of Poland he along with his family sheltered a Jewish woman and in a 1945 publication he condemned the mass murder of Jews by Nazi Germany during the war as "monstrous"

Wojciechowski is described as a co-initiator of the Polish "Western thought" (myśl zachodnia), a "mirror image of the German Ostforschung with a pinch of pan-Slavic sentiment thrown in". Unlike Ostforschung this movement was marginal in Poland, and limited only to Poznań University, while the Ostforschung was influential and remained (unlike the Poznań thinkers who were in conflict with state authorities both before and after World War II) in friendly relations with Berlin government. The Polish researchers rejected the state model found in Germany, and preferred Francoist Spain or Salazar's Portugal, remaining distrustful of Hitler. They rejected such ideas as biological racism, eugenics and militarism and neo-pagan movement.

=== German occupation of Poland ===
==== Fate during German occupation ====
While initially able to escape Germans, he was captured by them in October 1939 and held as hostage along with other Polish intellectuals, craftsmen, politicians and students. The group was held as part of German effort to crush Polish resistance, and they were threatened with murder in case of armed resistance. Every few days, Wojciechowski was allowed to visit home. If he wouldn't return, the others would be shot. Eventually he was released two months later, due to his pregnant wife's plea. Despite his release, the family faced further reprisals, as it had to flee Poznań as initial ethnic cleansing of Poles from the region was initiated by Nazi German authorities. Wojciechowski eventually found refugee at a friend's house in Kraków.

==== Underground activity ====
During the occupation of Poland in World War II, he was involved with the Polish underground authorities, teaching at the Uniwersytet Ziem Zachodnich ("University of the Western Territories", a part of the necessary underground education system) necessary, as all Poles were forbidden basic schooling as part of German genocide regarding Polish nation. He continued his research, and supervised his students (Zdzisław Kaczmarczyk, Kazimierz Kolańczyk) who finished two dissertations. In 1944 he also headed the Government Delegation for Poland's Science Section in the Department of Information, and briefly, after the fall of the Warsaw Uprising, he was the deputy director of the Department. As part of conspiracy during Nazi German occupation he was one of the founding members of Ojczyzna-Omega, a conspiracy movement that gathered surviving (as Germans carried out systematic extermination of Polish educated classes) Polish intellectuals, priests, journalists, lawyers and teachers, who organised charity work, secret education and worked on concepts of post-war Poland; most of the members were Christian democrats and National Democrats. Ojczyzna-Omega envisioned a post-war Poland that would be a democratic, efficiently administrated state populated mainly by Polish majority alongside Jewish population and Slavic groups. The organisation believed that Nazi Germany (which attempted a genocide of Poles) was far more dangerous than Soviet Union and pushed for a compromise with Soviets.

Commissioned by the Union of Armed Struggle, a forerunner of the Home Army, Wojciechowski created a concept of a post-war Polish–German border in 1941, which included an overview of the Polish and Polonizable part of the population in areas between the pre-war border and the Oder-Neisse line. In tune with and probably in charge of Wojciechowski the director of the library of Kórnik at that time prepared the takeover of archives, museums and libraries in the future Western territories. In his designs Wojciechowski wanted to avoid what he defined as the mistakes of the Versailles Treaty. The border at Oder and Lusatian Neisse was essential for him, as he considered it, the historical argument was not decisive here, the safest and most defensible one.

On 17 December 1944 Tomasz Arciszewski, the Polish Prime Minister of the Polish government-in-exile in London, declared in a Sunday Times interview, that a post-war Poland had no territorial claims towards Stettin (Szczecin) and Breslau (Wrocław) but considers Lviv and Wilna an integral part of the Polish state. This led to a vote of no confidence of the Ojczyzna-group against Arciszewski for this "renunciation of the Polish war aims" and finally to the breakup with the Polish government-in-exile in London. Also in December 1944 he resumed the consequences of the failed Warsaw Uprising that, from his view, had shown, that not the Home Army but only the Red Army was capable to liberate Warsaw.

On 13 February 1945 Wojciechowski met the Prime Minister of the Provisional Government of the Republic of Poland, Edward Osóbka-Morawski, and handed over a memorandum about the foundation and activities of the Western Institute in which he asked for the support of the institute. The memorandum was addressed to the “Polish government”, thus recognizing the Provisional Government, contrary to the London exile-government, as legitimate. Conversely Wojciechowski's concept aided the governmental demand to legitimize the Polish acquirements in the West

=== Post-war ===
Westward shift of Poland after World War II. Pink areas: pre-war German territory transferred to Poland after the war. Grey area: pre-war Polish territory transferred to the Soviet Union after the war.

In 1945 his book "Poland-Germany. Ten centuries of struggle" (first edition 1933) was reissued. To Wojciechowski the history of Polish-German relations was coined by an eternal struggle against German aggression which was founded on a lack of the ability of Germans to cohabit peacefully with Slavs and their "biological" hatred of everything Slavic. Wojciechowski described his view of the post-war situation:

"There is a new epoch of Slavic march to the west that has replaced the German Drang nach Osten. Who doesn’t understand it, won’t understand the new era and won’t see properly the place of Poland in the new international reality”

Wojciechowski supported a new German-Polish border that would allocate the whole Oder Lagoon up to the river Peene to Poland.

He resumed teaching at UAM. He became a member of the Polish Academy of Learning (PAU) in 1945 and of the Polish Academy of Sciences (PAN) in 1952. In 1944, he established the Western Institute (Instytut Zachodni), an institution dedicated to studying the Polish history of what would become the Recovered Territories. Initially in Warsaw, the institute's seat moved to Poznań in 1945. Wojciechowski remained its director until his death in 1955. In 1945, Wojciechowski founded the affiliated journal Przegląd Zachodni ("Western Review") and remained his editor-in-chief until his death in 1955. (An English-language version of the journal under the title Polish Western Affairs was published from 1960 to 1994). From 1948–52, he was also founder and editor-in-chief of the "Journal of Law and History" (Czasopismo Prawno-Historyczne), which continues to exist to this day. In his prologue to the bookseries "Old Polish lands" (1948–1957) he explained the purpose of the volumes to the reader:

"Our publication ... is biased; in fact, it is consciously biased. ... We have not gone out of our way to write so-called objective history. Our task was to present the Polish history of those territories and to place the modern Polish reality of those territories within this historical context."

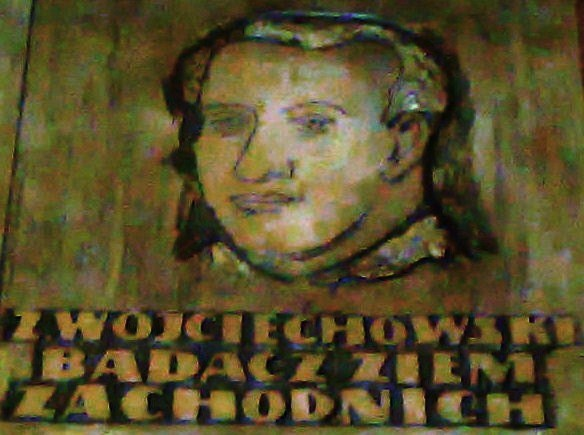
Zygmunt Wojciechowski - researcher of the Western Lands - plaque in the Imperial Castle in Poznań

In 1950, as Poland underwent Stalinization, Wojciechowski was condemned for his "anti-German chauvinism" at a Polish historians conference. Hence the open synthesis of nationalist and communist historiography became less influential, though Polish Marxist publications maintained an anti-German undertone.

Zygmunt Wojciechowski died in Poznań, Poland, he was the father of historian Marian Wojciechowski (1927–2006).

=== Recognition ===
He was a recipient of Commander's Cross and Officer's Cross of Order of Polonia Restituta.

In 1984 the Western Institute was eventually named in his honor. In Poland Zygmunt Wojciechowski is recognised today as exceptional historian, and one of people who formed Polish intellectual elites.

== Publications ==
- Ustrój polityczny ziem polskich w czasach przedpiastowskich Lwów 1927
- Początki immunitetu w Polsce 1930
- Polska nad Wisłą i Odrą w X wieku. Studium nad genezą państwa Piastów i jego cywilizacji [Poland on the Vistula and Oder in the 10th century: A study on the genesis of the Piast state and its civilization], Warszawa: Nasza Księgarnia, 1939
- Państwo polskie w wiekach średnich. Dzieje ustroju 1945
- Polska-Niemcy. Dziesięć wieków zmagania [Poland-Germany. Ten centuries of struggle]. Poznań: Wydawnictwo Instytutu Zachodniego, 1945
- Polska-Czech. Dziesięć wieków sąsiedztwa Poland-Czechs. Ten centuries of neighbourhood. 1947 (with Tadeusz Lehr-Spławiński, Kazimierz Piwiarski)
- Państwo polskie w wiekach średnich. Dzieje ustroju [The Polish state in the Middle Ages: The history of its political system], Poznań: Poznań Księgarnia Akademicka, 1948
- Zygmunt Stary (1506-1548) Sigismund the Old (1506–1548)], 1946, re-issue Warszawa: Państwowy Instytut Wydawniczy, 1979
- (as editor) Poland's Place in Europe. Poznań: Wydawnictwo Instytutu Zachodniego, 1947
