= Robert Buech =

Robert Buech was a politician in Wisconsin.

== Biography ==
Buech was born in Posen, Prussia (now Poznań, Poland) in 1870. He later moved to Milwaukee, Wisconsin. Buech died on May 18, 1949.

== Career ==
Buech was a candidate for the United States House of Representatives from Wisconsin's 4th congressional district in 1920 and 1942. He lost to incumbent John C. Kleczka in 1920 and to incumbent Thaddeus Wasielewski in 1942. In 1934, Buech was a candidate for Lieutenant Governor of Wisconsin, losing to Thomas J. O'Malley. Additionally, he was Sheriff of Milwaukee County, Wisconsin. Buech was a member of the Socialist Party of America.
