= Antoni Czubiński =

Polish historian (1928–2003)

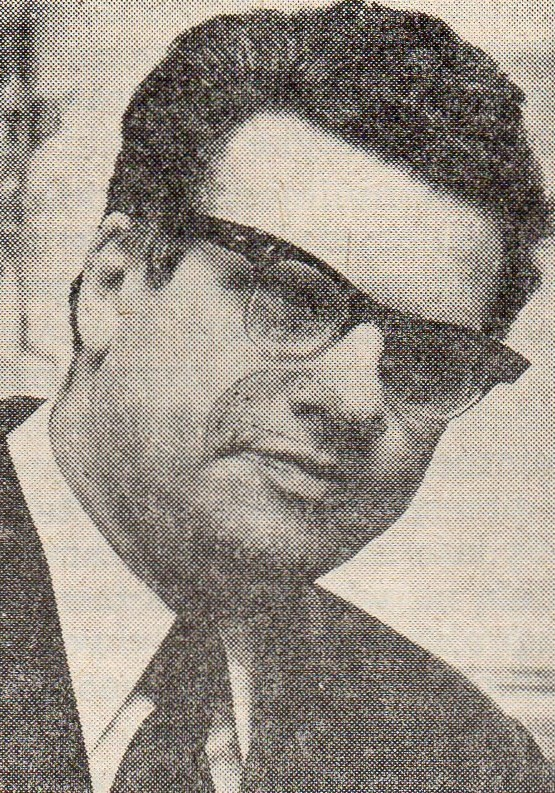
Antoni Czubiński

Antoni Czubiński (22 November 1928 in Konin, Poland – 10 February 2003 in Poznań, Poland) was a Polish historian and director of the Western Institute (Instytut Zachodni) in Poznań from 1978 to 1990. He was the Polish-side Chairman of German-Polish Textbook Commission from 1984 to 1990.

He represented leftist views, and in his works consequently defended the role of the left in preserving Polish statehood in face of both Hitler and Stalin during 20th century. After 1989 he was a moderate defender of the previous system, underlining its achievements in regards to reducing poverty and increasing Polish independence from Soviet Union. He was convinced that in time People's Republic of Poland will be seen in more neutral, and even positive light and up until his death he continued to hope that more historians will share his view. After his death in 2003 he was posthumously awarded the Order of Polonia Restituta for his contribution to Polish history.

== Publications ==
- Antoni Czubiński, Powstanie Wielkopolskie 1918-1919. Geneza-charakter-znaczenie, Poznań 1978
- A.Czubiński, Z.Grot, B.Miśkiiewcz, Powstanie Wielkopolskie 1918-1919. Zarys dziejów, Warszawa 1978
- Antoni Czubiński (ed.), Polacy i Niemcy. Dziesięć wieków sąsiedztwa, PWN, Warszawa 1987
- Antoni Czubiński 1928-2003. Życie i dzieło. Opracowanie zbiorowe edited by S. Sierpowski Poznań. 2004
- "Antoni Czubiński 1928-2003" in Wybitni historycy wielkopolscy. Pod redakcją Jerzego Strzelczyka. Wydawnictwo Poznańskie. Poznań 2010, p. 745-766
