= Karl Wilhelm von Willisen =

Prussian general (1790-1879)

Karl Wilhelm Freiherr von Willisen
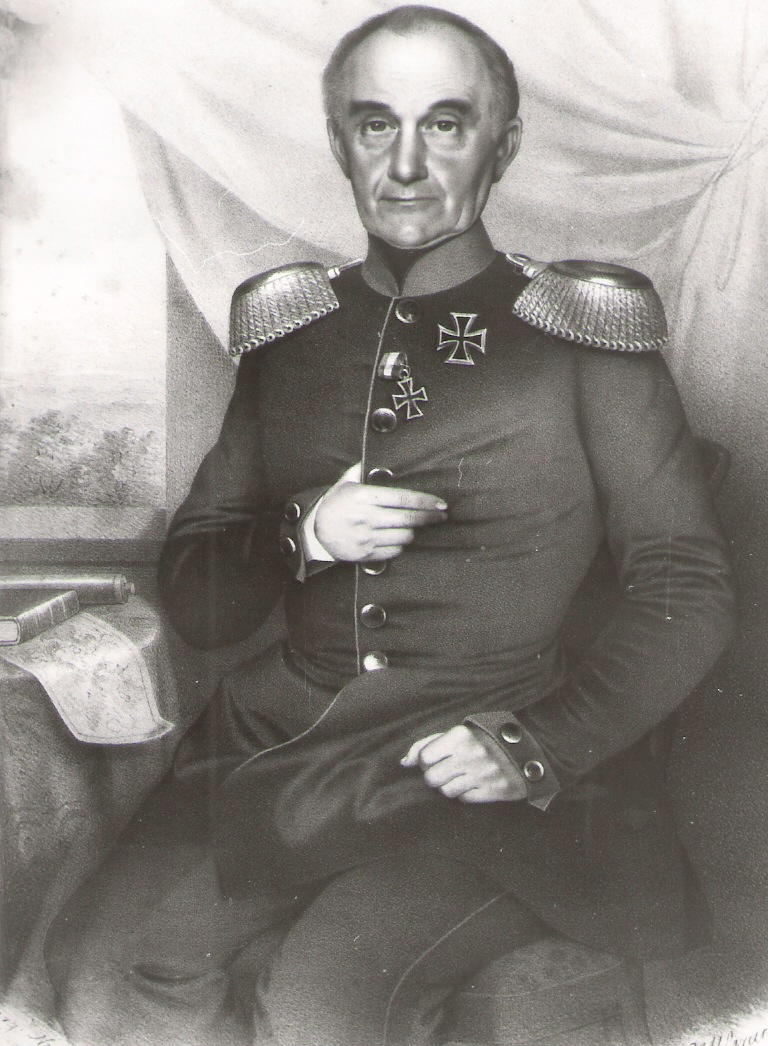
- Karl Wilhelm von Willisen
- Born: 30 April 1790; Staßfurt, Prussia
- Died: 25 February 1879 (aged 88); Dessau, Anhalt, German Empire
- Military career
- Allegiance: Prussia; German Confederation; Schleswig-Holstein
- Service years: 1804–1807, 1809, 1813–1849, 1850
- Rank: Lieutenant General
- Conflicts: Napoleonic Wars; First Schleswig War
- Awards: Iron Cross; Order of the Red Eagle

Karl Wilhelm Freiherr von Willisen (30 April 1790 – 25 February 1879) was a Prussian general.

== Biography ==
Willisen was born in Stassfurt as the third son of the mayor of Stassfurt, Karl Wilhelm Hermann von Willisen (1751–1807) and his wife Friederike von Trotha (1768–1826).

=== Early career ===
Willisen was educated in the Prussian Cadet Corps and joined the Prussian Infantry Regiment No 21 "Duke of Brunswik" in 1804. He was seriously wounded in the Battle of Auerstedt and left the Prussian Army after the Treaty of Tilsit in 1807. He studied at the University of Halle and joined the Freikorps Schill in 1809 in the struggle against Napoleon, the same year he joined the Austrian Army and fought in the rank of a lieutenant in the Battle of Wagram.

After the Peace of Schönbrunn Willisen took vacation from the Austrian Army but did not return into service. He lived in Teutschenthal near Halle (Saale), where he was captured as a deserter in 1811 and imprisoned at Kassel. He escaped out of prison and returned into Prussian service after his official release out of Austrian service. Willisen fought in the Napoleonic battles of 1813/14 as a member of the staff of the Prussian "Silesian Army" and became a captain in Gebhard Leberecht von Blücher's staff in 1815. He remained in the Prussian generalstaff after Napoleon's defeat and became a teacher of "Art of War" and "History of War" at the Prussian Military Academy. He published several books and opposed the views of Carl von Clausewitz. About 1830 Willisen also criticized the Russian warfare in the Napoleonic wars and showed his sympathy towards the Polish Uprisings in Congress Poland and the democratic movement in general.

Willisen was redeployed to the staff of the III. Army-Korps under the command of Prince William of Prussia, the later German Emperor Wilhelm I., in Breslau and as a Chief of Staff to the V. Army-Korps under General Karl von Grolman in Posen in 1832.

In 1843 Willisen became the Commander of a Brigade in Breslau and was the candidate of the liberals for the position of the Prussian war minister in 1848.

=== Greater Poland Uprising ===
Throughout the Spring of Nations in 1848 a Polish Uprising occurred in the Prussian Grand Duchy of Posen. A delegation of the Polish National Committee received an audience by the Prussian King and on their demand Willisen was appointed as the King's special envoy (Ziviler Königlichen Kommissar für die Provinz Posen) for the planned reorganisation of the Province. He arrived in Posen on 5 April 1848 and soon came into conflict with the German inhabitants of the area and the military commander of Posen, Friedrich August Peter von Colomb, as his position was considered as too polonophile. On 11 April he concluded the convention of Jarosławiec, by which the Polish forces under the command of Ludwik Mierosławski were acknowledged but reduced to a size of 3,000 located in different camps and a Polish administration was to be established. Willisen's compromise failed, the King did accept the conditions negotiated with the Poles providing for the Duchy's national reorganization, but he simultaneously excluded several western and northern counties from consideration. The convention was largely criticized by the German public and Willisen had to leave Posen again on 20 April 1848, avoiding to pass centers of the German Population, now "exposed to personal insult, nay even danger, from the infuriated German and Jewish mobs of Posen", soon after he was dismissed and replaced by Ernst von Pfuel. Willisen later had to justify his actions in his book "Akten und Bemerkungen über meine Sendung nach dem Grossherzogthum Posen"

Afterwards Willisen was sent on diplomatic missions to Paris, Croatia and Italy, where he was attached as a military observer to Radetzky's Army in the First Italian War of Independence.

=== Schleswig-Holstein War ===
In 1849 he tendered his resignation out of Prussian service and became the Supreme commander of the forces of the German Confederation in the First Schleswig War in April 1850. Willisen commanded the Schleswig-Holstein troops in the Battle of Idstedt and the attack on Friedrichstadt. After the defeat of his troops Willisen resigned and lived in Paris (France), Silesia and finally Dessau, where he died on 25 February 1879.

=== Promotions and awards ===
- 1806: Fähnrich
- 1813: Premiereleutnant
- 1814: Stabskapitän
- 1815: Kapitän
- 1818: Major
- 1834: Oberstleutnant
- 1836: Oberst
- 1842: Generalmajor
- 1849: Generalleutnant
- 1813: Iron Cross 2. class
- 1815: Iron Cross 1. class
- 1835: Order of the Red Eagle 4. class
- 1835: Order of St. Anna (Russian)
- 1838: Order of the Red Eagle 3. class with ribbon
- 1846: Order of the Red Eagle 2. class with oakleaves

== Personal life ==
Willisen married Emilie von Brause (1804–1849) on 28 November 1829 in Berlin and after the death of his first wife he married Editha von Caprivi (1843–1873), sister of the later German Chancellor Leo von Caprivi. Willisen had no children.

== Works ==
- Zur Polenfrage. Flugblatt, Berlin 1848.
- Offener Brief an den Major von Voigts-Rhetz als Entgegnung auf seine aktenmäßige Darstellung. Berlin 1848.
- Über die große Landes-Vertheidigung oder über den Festungsbau und Heerbildung in Preußen. Berlin 1860.
- Die Theorie des großen Krieges.
  - Teil 1 und 2: Der Russisch-polnische Feldzug des Jahres 1831. Leipzig 1840.
  - Teil 3: Der Italienische Feldzug des Jahres 1848. Berlin 1849.
  - Teil 4: Die Feldzüge der Jahre 1859 und 1866. Leipzig 1868.
