= Zamkowa Street school building =

- Budynek szkolny przy ul. Zamkowej w Miłosławiu
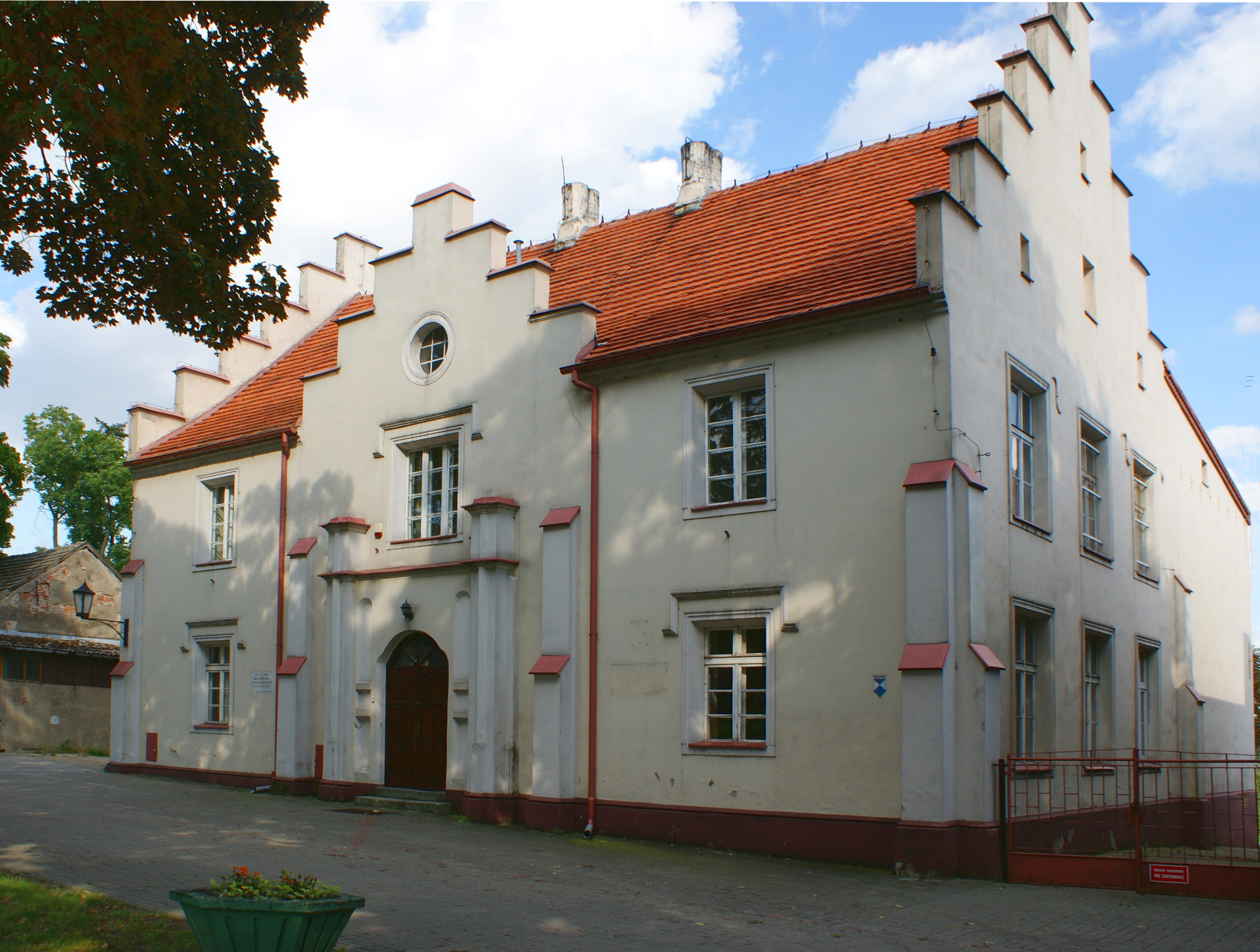

- Location within Poland

General information
- Type: school
- Architectural style: Neo-Gothic
- Location: Miłosław, Poland, Poland
- Coordinates: 52°12′00″N 17°29′17″E
- Construction started: 1846
- Completed: 1848

The Zamkowa Street school building (Polish: Budynek szkolny przy ul. Zamkowej) in Milosław, Poland was a religious school, built in the neo-Gothic style in the 1840s. It became a hospital to treat wounded combatants during the Greater Poland Uprising of 1848, and was again involved in fighting around the time of the revolution of 1905-07.

== Description ==
The school is a multi-storey building with neo-Gothic roofing, and was probably made by Seweryn Mielżyński. Its address is 13 Castle Street (ul. Zamkowa 13).

The rooms contained in the school were as follows:

- 9 classrooms,
- Teacher's lounge,
- Secretariat,
- Office of the Director,
- Office of the Deputy Director,
- Personnel office,
- Two utility rooms,
- Bathroom.

Close to the school, at 19 Castle Street, is located a clergy house built during the years 1894–1895, and on the opposite side of the street is a former evangelical church. At the end of 2012 the school building was partially converted into social housing.

== Bibliography ==
- http://www.miloslaw.info.pl/content/mi%C5%82os%C5%82aw-stara-szko%C5%82|
- http://spmiloslaw.edupage.org/about|
