= Miloslaw Park =

- Park in Miloslaw
- Interactive map of Miloslaw Park
- Nearest city: Miloslaw
- Coordinates: 52°11′41″N 17°29′1″E
- Area: approx 37.8
- Created: 1904-1910

Miloslaw Park is located in Miłosław, a town in Września County, Greater Poland Voivodeship, Poland.

== Description ==
In the park there are numerous ponds, there are 3 islands, 4 channels over which smuggled bridges and a network of walking paths. In the beginning was decorated in the French style, then was transformed into one half. Nineteenth-century English style parks. The pride of the park are avenues: hornbeam-lime leading to a wooden cross, hornbeam leading towards monument Slovak, 4-row alley larch running on the south side of the pond and crossed the larch and spruce avenues.

The park is entered through an ornate, neo-Gothic brick gate grate restored in 1995. At the gate there is the former caretaker's house and park built in 1854, called the " gardener's cottage." The building has an irregular shape with a storied part of the central hipped roof covered with flattened and round, now reduced, tower. The park is surrounded by the historic fence, reconstructed in 1996–1999. The park is located in a palace expanded in the nineteenth century, once the seat of Mielżyńskich, later Kościelski burned in 1945 and rebuilt in the years 1963–1969. After rebuilding housed various public institutions, and now houses the Gymnasium Julius Slovak .

== History ==
The park was established already at the end of the eighteenth century, the park is the oldest monument in Poland Julius Słowckiego. On behalf of Joseph Kościelski made it known sculptor Wielkopolska Władysław Marcinkowski. The unveiling of the monument took place on September 16, 1899. Came then: Henryk Sienkiewicz, Leon Wyczółkowski, Lucjan Rydel, Julian Fałat, as well as other prominent scientists, artists and writers .

== Nature ==
Stand of the park create both native species (hornbeams (grab), ashs, lime trees, alders, Robinia and oak), as well as exotic (ginkgo biloba, Wiązowiec West, Japanese pagoda, glediczja locust and Taxodium). The ponds nest and stop during air numerous species of aquatic birds (grebes, swans, goose, duck, coots).

=== Monuments of nature ===
- Ginkgo biloba (polling 320 cm)
- English oak called "Oak Sienkiewicz" (polling 690 cm)
- Ashs (polling 415 and 430 cm)
- July Caucasian (polling 395 cm)
- Plane (polling 430 cm)

=== Bibliography ===
- Information about the park on the Landscape Parks (accessed 19.09.2013)
- Information about the park on the Miloslaw (accessed 19.09.2013)
- Information about the monument (accessed 19.09.2013)
- Information about the palace (accessed 06.01.2014)
- Information about the monument (accessed 06.01.2014)
- Information about the monument (accessed06.01.2014)
