= Komorniki =

- Village
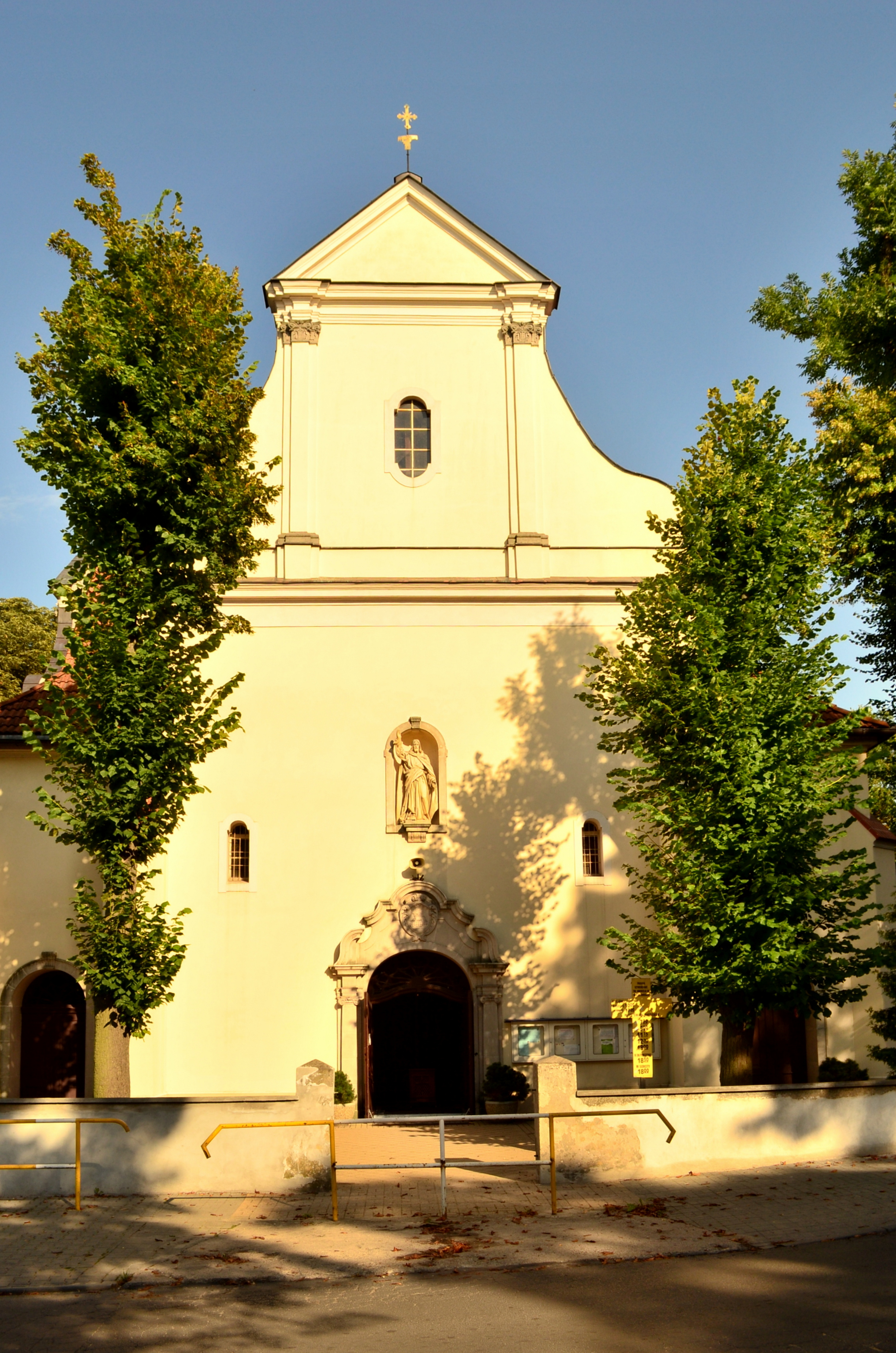
- Church of Saint Andrew

- Location within Poland
- Coordinates: 52°20′10″N 16°48′25″E
- Country: Poland
- Voivodeship: Greater Poland
- County: Poznań
- Gmina: Komorniki
- First mentioned: 1136

Government
  - Mayor: Jan Broda

Population (2013)
  - Total: 20,000
- Time zone: UTC+1 (CET)
  - Summer (DST): UTC+2 (CEST)
- Postal code: 62-052
- Area code: +48 61
- Vehicle registration: PZ
- Website: http://www.komorniki.pl

Komorniki [kɔmɔrˈniki] is a village in Poland, located in Greater Poland Voivodeship, Poznań County, Gmina Komorniki (Poznań metropolitan area), with approximately 5,500 inhabitants. The gmina (municipality) of Komorniki, including the village of Komorniki and 10 other villages, has about 18,325 inhabitants and is an agricultural and industrial region. (See Gmina Komorniki.) The village lies on the A2 Highway and National Road number 5 from Poznań to Wrocław, about 7 kilometres (4 mi) from the city of Poznań. Komorniki adjoins Poznań, Luboń, Plewiska, and the Wielkopolska National Park.

The village is famous for its Komorniki Festival of Organ and Chamber Music.

The Polish Baroque Orchestra society has its registered office in Komorniki.

== History ==
The village was first mentioned in 1136. Komorniki was a private church village of the Diocese of Poznań, administratively located in the Poznań County in the Poznań Voivodeship in the Greater Poland Province of the Kingdom of Poland.

Following the joint German-Soviet invasion of Poland, which started World War II in September 1939, Komorniki was occupied by Germany until 1945. Stanisław Różycki, who organized the local unit of the Union of Armed Struggle resistance organization, was arrested by the occupiers in 1941, however, he escaped, and in 1942 he was arrested again, then imprisoned in Poznań and Wrocław, and sentenced to death, and murdered in 1943. During World War II, in January 1945, a German-perpetrated death march of prisoners of various nationalities from the dissolved camp in Żabikowo to the Sachsenhausen concentration camp passed through the village.

== Culture ==
- Komorniki Festival of Organ and Chamber Music
- Polish Baroque Orchestra
