= Szreniawa, Greater Poland Voivodeship =

Szreniawa
- Village
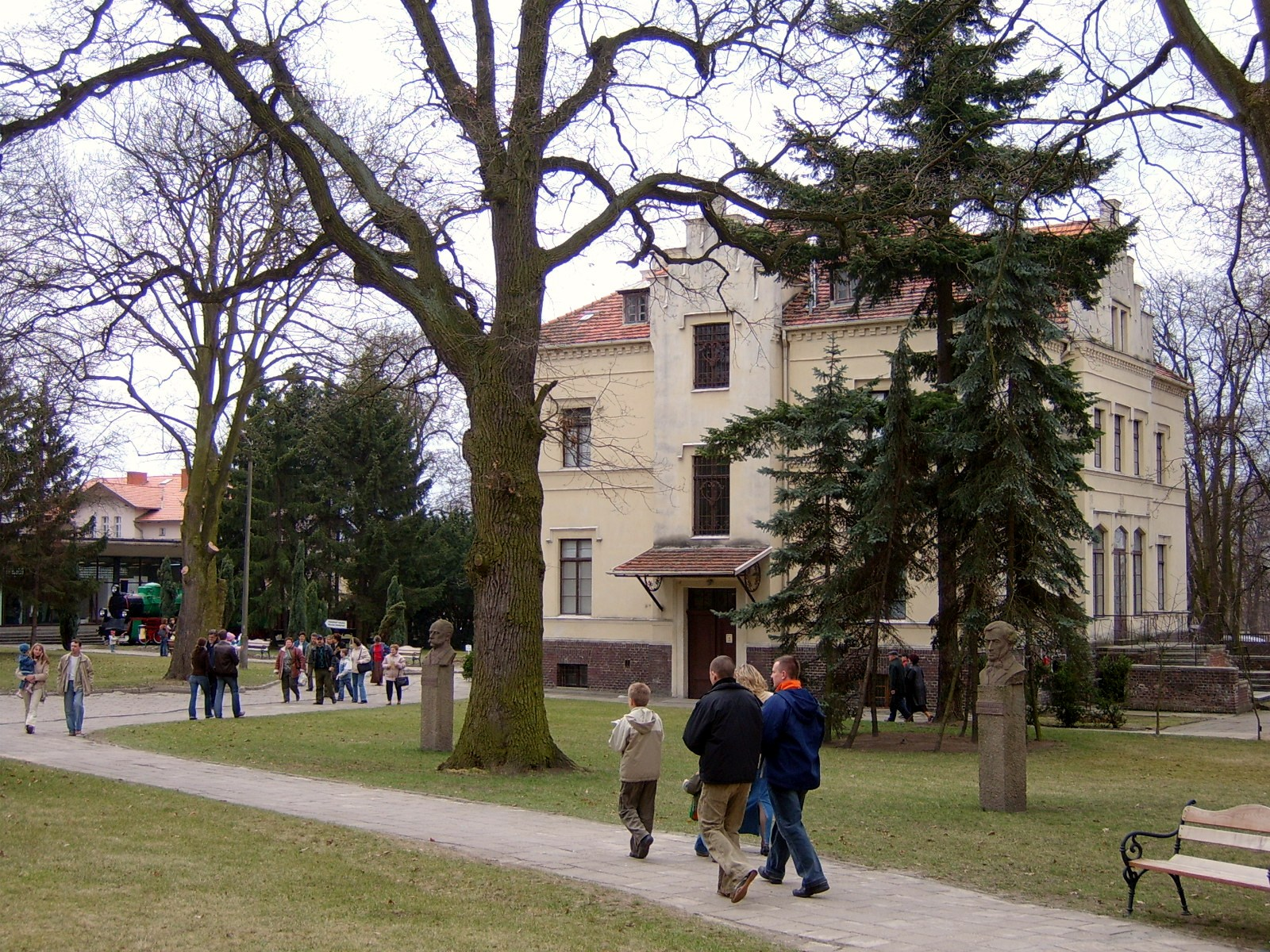
- National Museum of Agriculture

- Location within Poland
- Coordinates: 52°19′N 16°48′E
- Country: Poland
- Voivodeship: Greater Poland
- County: Poznań
- Gmina: Komorniki
- Population: 810

Szreniawa [ʂrɛˈɲava] is a village in the administrative district of Gmina Komorniki, within Poznań County, Greater Poland Voivodeship, in west-central Poland.

The village is the site of an open-air agricultural museum, the National Museum of Agriculture in Szreniawa, which also administers five branch museums in the Poznań area.
