= Battle of Miłosław =

Battle during the Greater Poland uprising (1848)

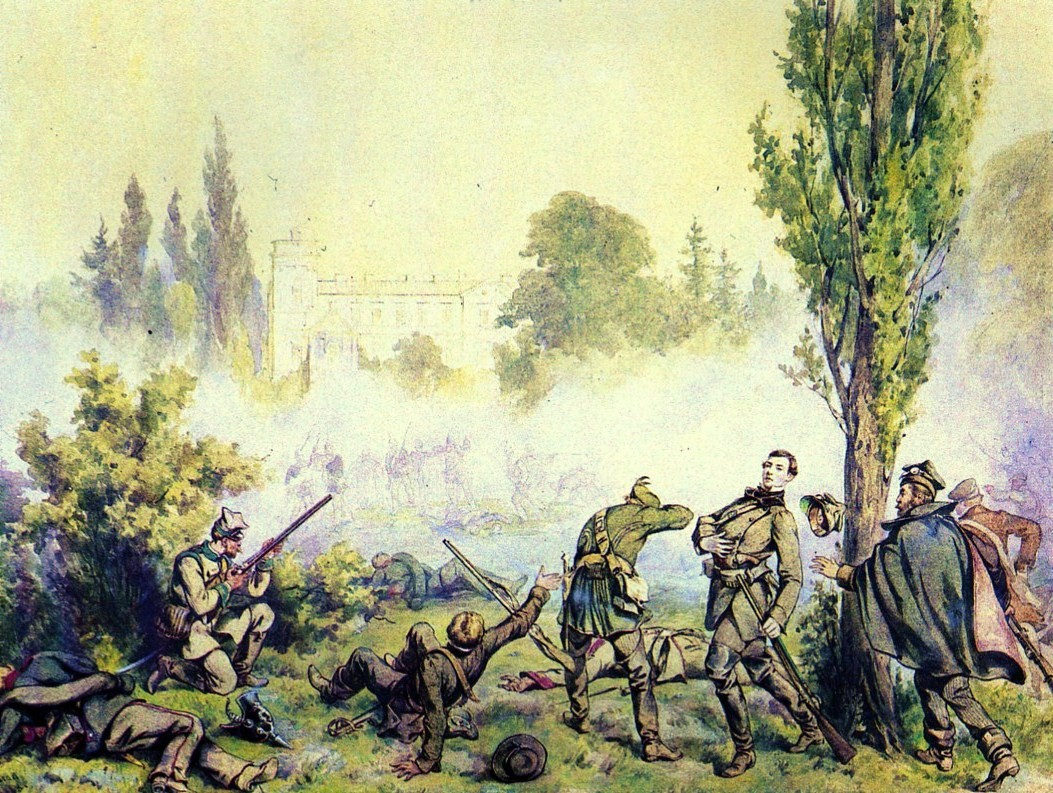
Battle of Miłosław by Juliusz Kossak

The Battle of Miloslaw, which was the largest battle of the Greater Poland Uprising (1848), took place on April 30, 1848, near the town of Miloslaw, which at that time belonged to the Grand Duchy of Posen, Kingdom of Prussia. Polish rebel forces under Ludwik Mieroslawski clashed with Prussian Army unit of General Blumen. Enjoying numerical superiority (app. 3,400 vs app. 2,500), the Poles won the battle.

After Prussian victory in the Battle of Ksiaz, General Blumen headed towards Miloslaw, where Ludwik Mieroslawski stayed with his forces (1,200 men, 4 cannons). Mieroslawski at first tried to negotiate with the enemy, but after finding out about Polish reinforcements (1,000 soldiers from Nowe Miasto nad Warta and 1,200 soldiers from Pleszew), he decided to break the talks.

In the first phase of the battle, Polish forces were pushed out of the town, and Blumen decided to use his cavalry, in order to disperse the enemy. Meanwhile, the units from Nowe Miasto and Pleszew reached Miloslaw, and the Poles counterattacked. In the second phase, Poles re-entered Miloslaw, pushing the Prussians out of the town. Polish victory was not complete, as enemy forces managed to get away with most soldiers and equipment. Polish losses were estimated at 200 killed, while Prussians lost 225 men.

The Battle of Miloslaw is commemorated on the Tomb of the Unknown Soldier, Warsaw, with the inscription "MILOSLAW 30 IV 1848".

== Sources ==
- Mała Encyklopedia Wojskowa, Wydawnictwo Ministerstwa Obrony Narodowej, Warszawa 1967, Wydanie I, Tom 2.
