= Krzysztof Czerwiński =

Krzysztof Czerwinski
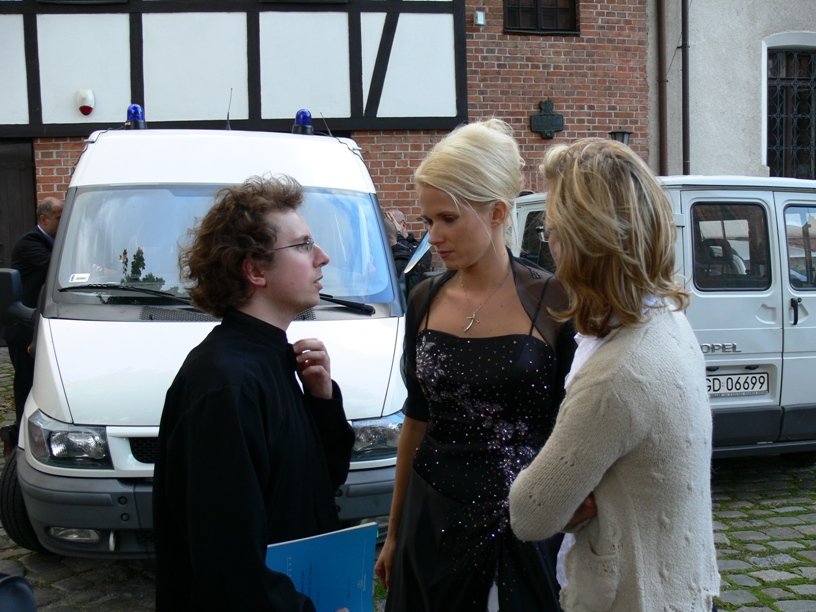
- Czerwinski with singer Anita Rywalska-Sosnowska after Polish Baroque Orchestra concert in Gdańsk

Background information
- Birth name: Krzysztof Jan Czerwiński
- Born: 13 January 1980 (age 45)
- Origin: Poznań, Poland
- Genres: Classical
- Occupation(s): musician (conductor, organist)
- Instrument: Organ
- Website: www.czerwinski.art.pl

Krzysztof Czerwinski (born 13 January 1980) is a Polish conductor, organist and voice teacher.

Czerwinski studied at Wieniawski School of music (Poznań, Poland), Eastman School of Music (University of Rochester, New York, US) and Birmingham Conservatoire (University of Central England, Birmingham, UK).

He has won many national and international competitions, awards, scholarships and gives performances throughout Europe and the USA.

On the basis of his artistic attainment, he has received prizes from Ministry of Culture and National Heritage (and its predecessor, the Ministry of Culture and Art) in Poland.

Czerwinski is founder, Conductor and Artistic Director of the Polish Baroque Orchestra and Artistic Director of the Komorniki Festival of Organ and Chamber Music in Poland.

He has served as accompanist, Assistant Conductor/Artistic Director and voice teacher for the Poznań Cathedral Choir of Men and Boys (Poznań, Poland).
