= Bazar House =

House in Miłosław, Poland

- Dom "Bazar w Miłosławiu
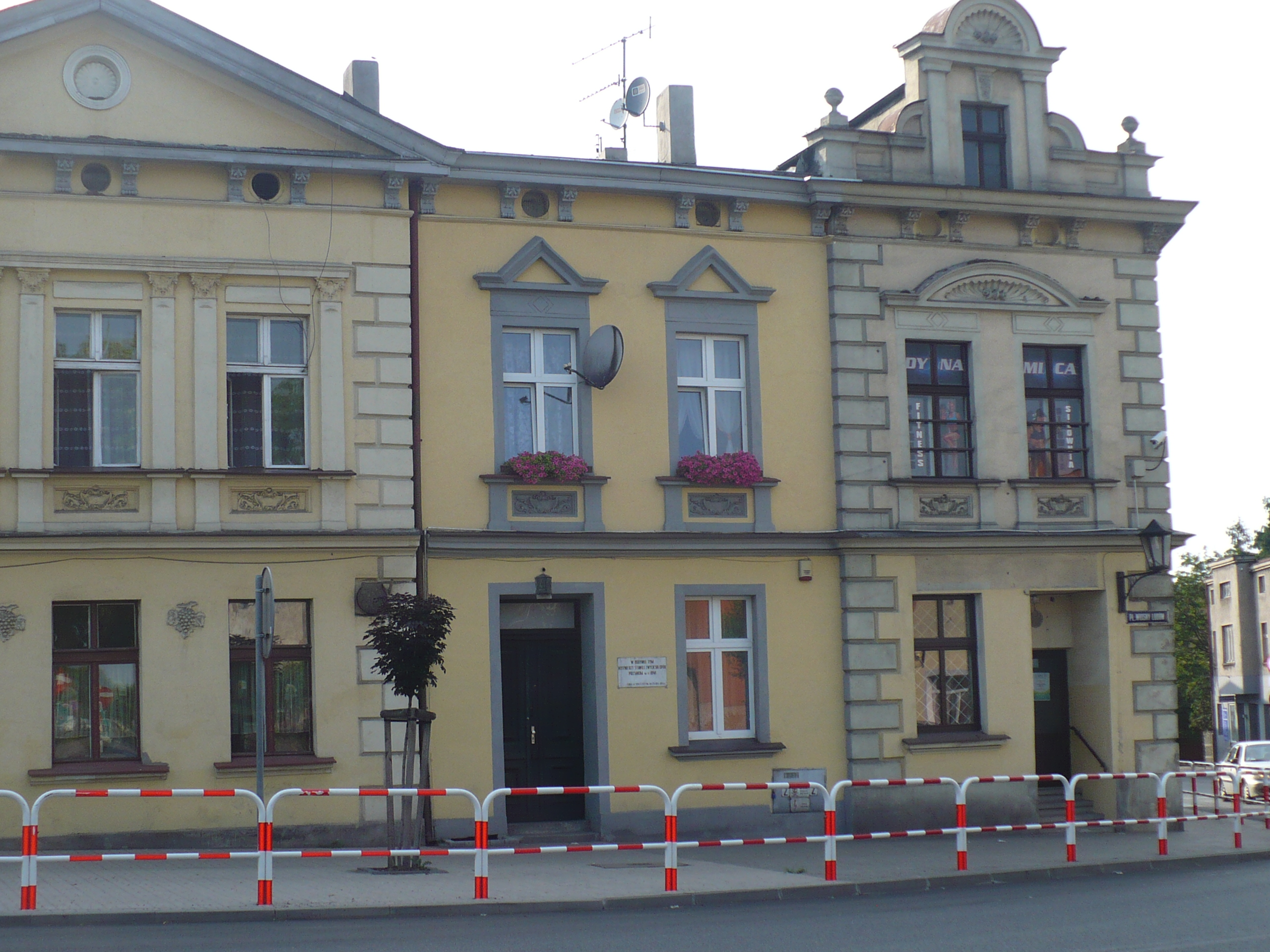

- Location within Poland

General information
- Location: Miłosław, Poland, Poland
- Coordinates: 52°12′24″N 17°28′59″E
- Completed: mid-19th century

Bazar House (Polish: Dom „Bazar”) is a historic tenement house in Miłosław, Greater Poland Voivodeship, Poland, located at 24 Spring of Nations Square.

== History ==
The building was erected in the mid-19th century on the site of a former tavern and inn with stables, now located in the Spring of Nations Square. It was expanded at the end of the same century. He is famous for the fact that during the Spring of Nations in 1848 Kosynierzy of the building fought a victorious battle with the Prussians, which resembles a commemorative plaque reads: "In this building Kosynierzy turning victorious Prussians resistance in r.1848, sponsored by the Society Miloslaw in 1964., during the celebration of the 650th anniversary of the city. "During the partitions, the building was the home of the fighting, among others germanization Gymnastic Society "Falcon", the building contained a restaurant, shops and hotel rooms Until July 4, 2012, on the ground floor was here, among others, pump-room "Bazaar" (property, which was in place, was sold to the owners of shops Adams)

Miłosław was granted its city chard before 1397; the town was re-incorporated, under the Magdeburg law, in 1539. By the late 16th century, Miłosław had become a crafts hub of importance. A 1599 fire destroyed the city almost in its entirety. A Lutheran synod took place there in 1607 which laid foundations for Protestantism in Wielkopolska. During the Swedish wars, troops commanded by Hetmans Stefan Czarniecki and Jerzy Lubomirski made their way through the town. Early in the 18th century, Miłosław was the property of the Grabski family and from 1777, to the end of the 19th century, it was owned by the Mielżyński family. During the Spring of Nations (1848) the town become one of the four major insurgent hubs. It was there that on April 30, 1848, Polish ulans, riflemen and scythe-bearing peasant recruits led by Ludwik Mierosławski and Feliks Białoskórnicki fought their victorious battle with the Prussian army.

== Tourist spots ==
A market is to be met in the town's centre (named plac Wiosny Ludów – i.e. ‘The Spring of Nations Square’), with a monument boulder dedicated to the local children who fought for having their native Polish language and speech retained at schools in the years 1901–1904 and 1906–1907. House no. 24 at the market is the former Bazar building for which the severest fight unfolded in 1848, as commemorated by a memorial plaque fixed on its wall. The town's peak point is the site of St. James's church from c. 1620, furnished with a late-renaissance main altar (also dated c. 1620) featuring an Assumption of Our Lady painting painted in 1844 by Seweryn Mielżyński. A neo-gothic belfry of c. 1850, crowned with crenellation, stands next to the church. In the yard by the church is a monument erected in honour of the 1848 insurgents. On the outer side of the church wall is a monument featuring statue of St. Laurence forming part of the grave of Miłosław scythe-bearing peasant soldiers. Opposite to it is a former Evangelical church of 1870–1872 where a Gallery of the Miłosław Cultural Centre is housed now. There is an early 19th-century palace in the southern part of the town. Beside the palace is a 37.8ha landscape park featuring ditches, bridges and ponds, founded, in a French style, in the early 19th century and later reshaped and extended into a romantic landscape park. The park contains a monument of Polish 19th-century poet Juliusz Słowacki, the earliest such ever in the Polish lands; next to the monument is a spreading oak-tree with the circumference of 680 cm. Marked hiking and cycling routes are set via Miłosław.
