= Wypalanki, Poznań County =

Wypalanki
- Village
- Location within Poland
- Coordinates: 52°19′N 16°44′E
- Country: Poland
- Voivodeship: Greater Poland
- County: Poznań
- Gmina: Komorniki

Wypalanki [vɨpaˈlanki] is a village in the administrative district of Gmina Komorniki, within Poznań County, Greater Poland Voivodeship, in west-central Poland.
