= Chomęcice =

- Village
- Location within Poland
- Coordinates: 52°19′54″N 16°44′56″E
- Country: Poland
- Voivodeship: Greater Poland
- County: Poznań
- Gmina: Komorniki

Population
  - Total: 734

Chomęcice [xɔmɛnˈt͡ɕit͡sɛ] is a village in the administrative district of Gmina Komorniki, within Poznań County, Greater Poland Voivodeship, in west-central Poland.
