= Rosnowo, Greater Poland Voivodeship =

Rosnowo
- Village
- Location within Poland
- Coordinates: 52°19′36″N 16°46′45″E
- Country: Poland
- Voivodeship: Greater Poland
- County: Poznań
- Gmina: Komorniki
- Population (approx.): 80
- Website: http://rosnowo.ir.pl

Rosnowo [rɔsˈnɔvɔ] is a village in the administrative district of Gmina Komorniki, within Poznań County, Greater Poland Voivodeship, in west-central Poland.

The village has an approximate population of 80.
