= Rosnówko, Greater Poland Voivodeship =

Rosnówko
- Village
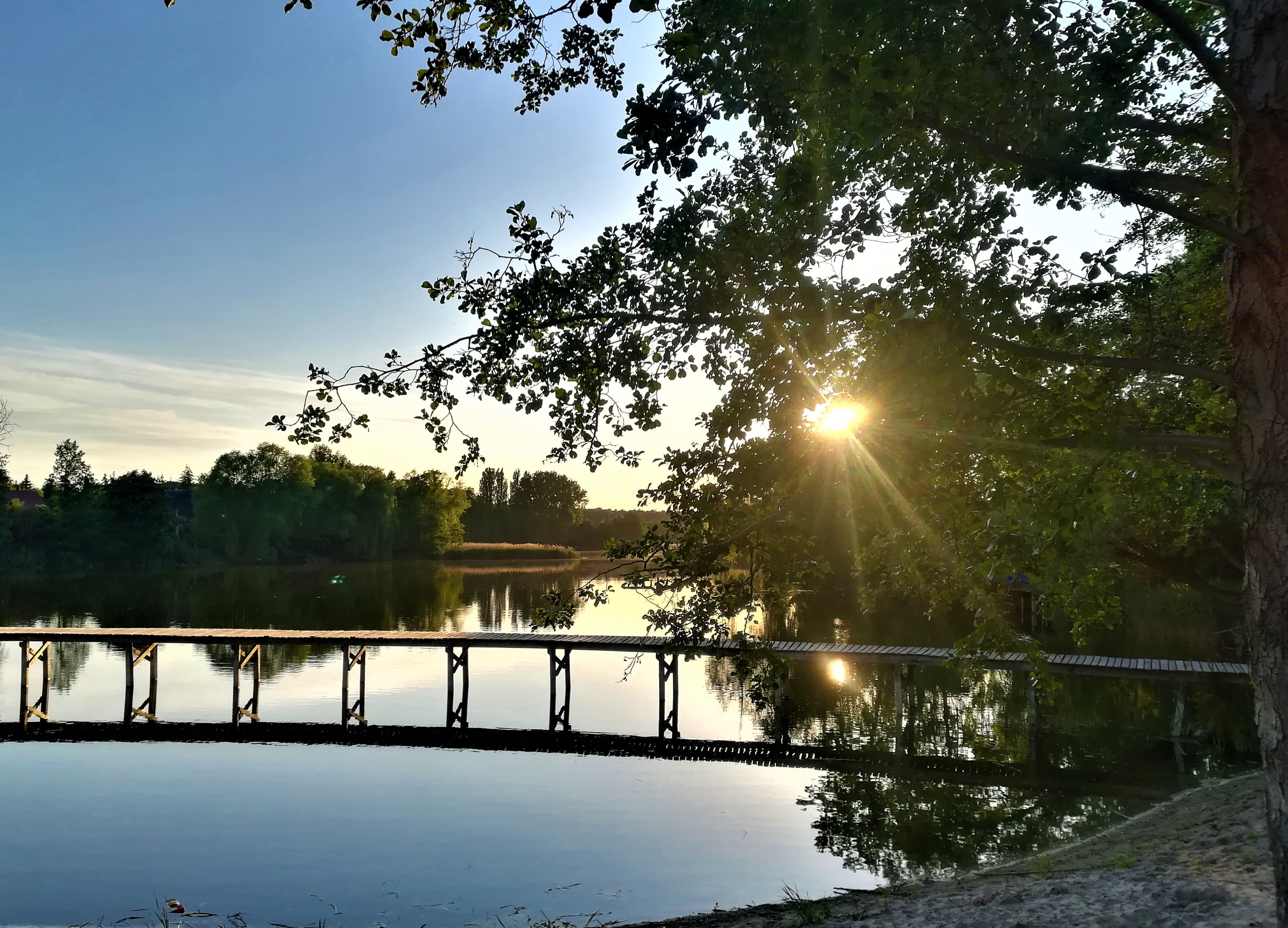
- Rosnowskie Duże Lake

- Location within Poland
- Coordinates: 52°18′02″N 16°46′13.8″E
- Country: Poland
- Voivodeship: Greater Poland
- County: Poznań
- Gmina: Komorniki
- Time zone: UTC+1 (CET)
  - Summer (DST): UTC+2 (CEST)
- Vehicle registration: POZ, PZ

Rosnówko [rɔsˈnufkɔ] is a village in the administrative district of Gmina Komorniki, within Poznań County, Greater Poland Voivodeship, in west-central Poland. It is situated on the shores of Rosnowskie Duże Lake.

== History ==
Rosnówko was a private village of Polish nobility, including the Chomęcki and Gajewski families, administratively located in the Poznań County in the Poznań Voivodeship in the Greater Poland Province of the Kingdom of Poland.

During World War II, in January 1945, a German-perpetrated death march of prisoners of various nationalities from the dissolved camp in Żabikowo to the Sachsenhausen concentration camp passed through the village.
