= Komorniki Festival of Organ and Chamber Music =

Annual summer concerts in Komorniki, Poland

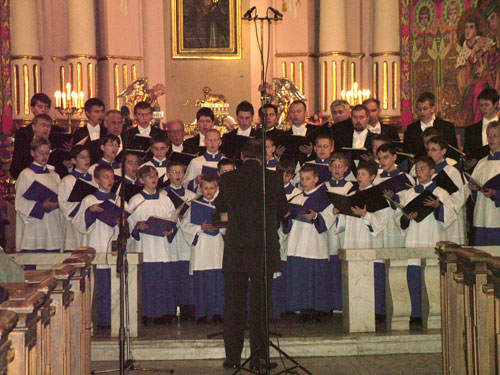
Komorniki Festival of Organ and Chamber Music
Inauguration of the Festival (2006) - Poznań Cathedral Choir
Background information
Original name	Ogólnopolski Festiwal Muzyki Organowej i Kameralnej - Komorniki
Location(s)	Komorniki, Poznań, Poznań County, Greater Poland Voivodeship, Poland
Years active	2006 – present
Date(s)	May – July
Genre(s)	Classical music (choral, orchestral, chamber, organ)
Venue(s)	St Andrew's Church, Komorniki; St Florian's Church, Wiry; St Faustyna's Church, Plewiska; St Hedwig of Silesia Church, Poznań
Website	www.festiwal.edu.pl
Board Members
Artistic Director; Krzysztof Czerwiński

The Komorniki Festival of Organ and Chamber Music (Polish: Ogólnopolski Festiwal Muzyki Organowej i Kameralnej - Komorniki) is a summer series of concerts held annually in Komorniki, Greater Poland Voivodeship, Poland. The festival was founded by Australian-based Polish conductor and organist Krzysztof Czerwiński, who also serves as its artistic director.

The festival features choral, organ and chamber music concerts among its events held in local churches including St Andrew's Church, Komorniki, St Florian's Church, Wiry, St Faustyna's Church, Plewiska and St Hedwig of Silesia Church, Poznań.

== 2015 Edition ==
=== Ensembles ===
- Tubicinatores Gedanenses

=== Soloists ===
- Łukasz Kuropaczewski – guitar
- Maciej Frąckiewicz – accordion
- Ryszard Żołędziewski – saxophone
- Taras Riznyak - tenor

=== Organists ===
- Piotr Rojek
- Gedymin Grubba
- Błażej Musiałczyk
- Krzysztof Czerwiński

== 2014 Edition ==
=== Ensembles ===
- Hevelius Brass

=== Soloists ===
- Rafał Kobyliński – tenor
- Kacper Chabrowski – accordion
- Ania Karpowicz – flute

=== Organists ===
- Marek Stefański
- Ewa Sawoszczuk
- Michał Markuszewski
- Krzysztof Czerwiński

== 2013 Edition ==
=== Ensembles ===
- The Cracow Brass Quintet

=== Soloists ===
- Pawel Hulisz – trumpet
- Mariusz Monczak – violin
- Anna Lecka – soprano

=== Organists ===
- Paul Rosoman
- Bogdan Narloch
- Marcin Lecki
- Krzysztof Czerwiński

== 2012 Edition ==
=== Ensembles ===
- Trio Con Brio
- The Cracow Trombone Quartet

=== Soloists ===
- Michał Stanikowski – guitar
- Jakub Drygas – clarinet
- Ian Maksin – cello

=== Organists ===
- Jerzy Kukla
- Gedymin Grubba
- Krzysztof Czerwiński

== 2011 Edition ==
=== Ensembles ===
- The Sydney Consort

=== Soloists ===
- Alina Urbańczyk-Mróz – soprano
- Anna Adamiak – mezzo-soprano
- Adam Musialski – violin

=== Organists ===
- Adam Klarecki
- Robert Grudzień
- Marek Kudlicki
- Krzysztof Czerwiński

== 2010 Edition ==
=== Ensembles ===
- Gdanski Kwartet Kontrabasowy
- Capella Bydgostiensis

=== Soloists ===
- Jolanta Sosnowska – pila sopranowa
- Hannah Berensen – soprano

=== Organists ===
- Marietta Kruzel-Sosnowska
- Jan Bartłomiej Bokszczanin
- Christopher Berensen
- Krzysztof Czerwiński

== 2009 Edition ==
=== Ensembles ===
- Affabre Concinui
- Parnassos

=== Soloists ===
- Janusz Ciepliński – trumpet
- Jolanta Solowiej – soprano

=== Organists ===
- Henryk Gwardak
- Jaroslaw Ciecierski
- Krzysztof Czerwiński
- Adam Klarecki

== 2008 Edition ==
=== Ensembles ===
- Bałtycki Kwintet Dęty
- Poznań Brass

=== Soloists ===
- Jacek Greszta - bass
- Karol Lipiński-Branka - violin

=== Organists ===
- Fatima Branka
- Krzysztof Czerwiński
- Waldemar Krawiec
- Piotr Rojek

== 2007 Edition ==
=== Ensembles ===
- Ars Antiqua
- Polish Baroque Orchestra
- Pueri Cantores Tarnovienses

=== Soloists ===
- Krzysztof Meisinger - guitar
- Przemyslaw Wawrzyniak - bagpipes

=== Organists ===
- Krzysztof Czerwiński
- Grzegorz Piekarz
- Ewa Polska
- Józef Serafin

== 2006 Edition ==
=== Ensembles ===
- Polish Baroque Orchestra
- Poznań Cathedral Choir of Men and Boys

=== Soloists ===
- Ewa Murawska - flute
- Anita Rywalska-Sosnowska - soprano

=== Organists ===
- Krzysztof Czerwiński
- Jakub Garbacz
- Gedymin Grubba
- Krzysztof Leśniewicz

=== CD recording ===
CD recording of the Festival
