= Gmina Komorniki =

Gmina Komorniki Komorniki Commune
- Gmina
- Flag Coat of arms
- Interactive map of Gmina Komorniki
- Coordinates (Komorniki): 52°16′N 16°42′E
- Country: Poland
- Voivodeship: Greater Poland
- County: Poznań County
- Seat: Komorniki

Area
  - Total: 66.55 km^{2} (25.70 sq mi)

Population (2006)
  - Total: 14,353
  - Density: 215.7/km^{2} (558.6/sq mi)
- Website: http://www.komorniki.pl/

Gmina Komorniki is a rural gmina (administrative district) in Poznań County, Greater Poland Voivodeship, in west-central Poland. Its seat is the village of Komorniki, which lies approximately 21 kilometres (13 mi) south-west of the regional capital Poznań.

The gmina covers an area of 66.55 square kilometres (25.7 sq mi), and as of 2006 its total population is 14,353. The largest village is Komorniki, with 3,500 inhabitants.

== Neighbouring gminas ==
Gmina Komorniki is bordered by the towns of Luboń, Poznań and Puszczykowo, and by the gminas of Dopiewo, Mosina and Stęszew.

== Villages ==
The gmina contains the following villages: Chomęcice, Głuchowo, Jarosławiec, Komorniki, Łęczyca, Rosnówko, Rosnowo, Szreniawa, Walerianowo, Wiry, Wypalanki and Plewiska.

== Culture ==
- Komorniki Festival of Organ and Chamber Music
- Polish Baroque Orchestra
