= Greater Poland Uprising (1848) =

1848 military insurrection in Prussian-occupied Greater Poland

Greater Poland uprising of 1848
- Part of the Revolutions of 1848
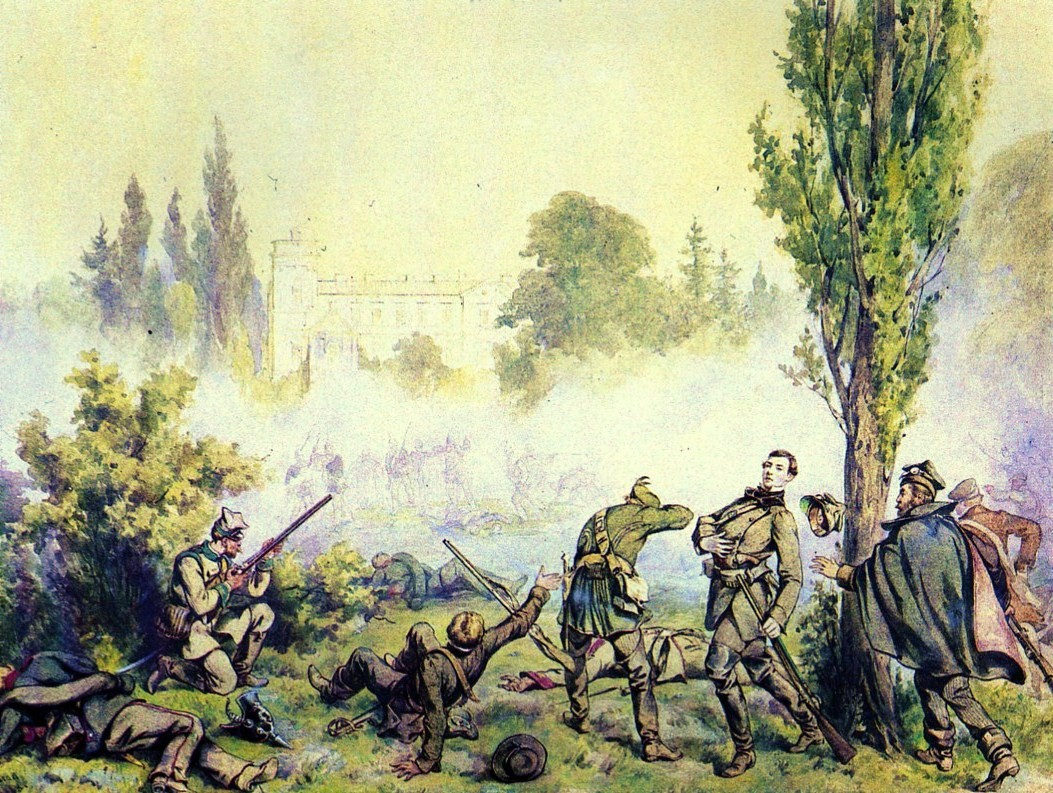
- Battle at Miłosław, 1868 painting by Juliusz Kossak.
Date	19 March 1848 – 9 May 1848
Location	Prussian Partition of Poland (Grand Duchy of Posen and former West Prussia), Silesia
Result	Prussian victory
Territorial changes	Autonomy of Grand Duchy of Posen removed, Posen transformed into the Province of Posen

Belligerents
Polish independence movement: Polish militia and peasant guerrillas	Kingdom of Prussia: Prussian Army and German colonists militia

Commanders and leaders
Ludwik Mierosławski	Friedrich August Peter von Colomb

Strength
Initially 20,000. demobilized to 4,000–5,000 before the start of the Prussian attack.	Initially 30,000, later reinforced to 40,000

Casualties and losses
640 killed	About 500 killed

The Greater Poland uprising of 1848 or Poznań Uprising (Polish: powstanie wielkopolskie 1848 roku / powstanie poznańskie) was an unsuccessful military insurrection of Poles against forces of the Kingdom of Prussia during the Revolutions of 1848. The main fighting in the Prussian Partition of Poland was concentrated in the Greater Poland region but some fighting also occurred in Pomerelia. Protests were also held in Polish-inhabited regions of Silesia.

== Background ==
=== 1772–1806 ===
While the Kingdom of Prussia already possessed a large Polish population in Upper Silesia, it gained additional Polish citizens during the partitions of Poland. From the beginnings of Prussian rule, Poles were subject to a series of measures aimed against them and their culture; the Polish language was replaced by German as the official language, and most administration was made German as well; the Prussian ruler Frederick the Great despised Poles and hoped to replace them with Germans. Poles were portrayed as 'backward Slavs' by Prussian officials who wanted to spread German language and culture. The land of Polish nobility was confiscated and given to German nobles. Frederick the Great settled around 300,000 colonists in the newly acquired provinces of Prussia and aimed at a removal of the Polish nobility by increasing the German population and trying to reduce Polish owned land.

=== 1806-1815 ===
The Poles were freed from the Prussians with the victory of Napoleon in the War of the Fourth Coalition, and started a successful uprising against the Prussian forces in 1806. The Prussian hold on Polish areas was somewhat weakened after 1807 where parts of its partition were given to the Duchy of Warsaw.

=== 1815–1830 ===
The power status of Prussia was dependent on hindering any form of Polish statehood, due to crucial position of Greater Poland and Pomerelia, areas inhabited by a Polish majority; it didn't support Polish attempts at restoration of Poland during the Congress of Vienna, where Prussia tried to gain the Duchy of Warsaw, but received only its western provinces. In 1815 the Prussian king made several guarantees in his speech to Poles in the newly formed Grand Duchy of Posen (created out of territories of Duchy of Warsaw) in regards to rights of Polish language and cultural institutions. In order to ensure loyalty of the newly re-conquered territories the Prussians engaged in several propaganda gestures hoping they would be enough to gain land-owners and aristocratic support. At the same time, the Lauenburg and Bütow Land and the former Starostwo of Draheim became the first territories of partitioned Poland to be quietly absorbed into the new German Confederation.

The base support of Prussian rule was from an influx of German colonists, officials and tradesmen, whose immigration started in 1772 due to Partitions of Poland and while it was halted in 1806, it soon was reinstated after 1815 as planned systemic action of Prussian government. After the Duchy of Warsaw was abolished in 1815, Prussia engaged in German colonization of Polish territories it acquired at the Congress of Vienna, continuing previous efforts started with the Partitions The Prussians knew exactly that the Polish aspiration was independence, however they were considering at the time two different methods to subdue Polish resistance. One advocated ruthless Germanization of the Polish provinces, the other pursued by Minister President Karl August von Hardenberg wanted to gain support of the Polish aristocracy, while turning them away from the (partially) pro-Polish Alexander I of Russia. Initially Hardenberg's position prevailed. At the same time the Prussians and Russians through secret police worked together against Polish movements that would seek independence either from Russia or Prussia, and the Prussian representative in Warsaw helped to create political climate that would abolish constitutional freedoms in Congress Poland. The situation in Polish areas of Prussia was calmed down after series of proclamations and assuring the Polish right to their education, religion and traditions. In the end, the Polish rights were defined very narrowly, and Prussia started to abolish the Polish language in administration, schooling, and courts. In 1819 the gradual elimination of Polish language in schools began, with German being introduced in its place. This procedure was briefly stopped in 1822 but restarted in 1824.

In 1825 August Jacob, a politician hostile to Poles, gained power over newly created Provincial Educational Collegium in Poznan. Across the Polish territories Polish teachers were being removed from work, German educational programs were being introduced, and primary schooling was being replaced by German one that aimed at creation of loyal Prussian citizens. Already in 1816 the Polish gymnasium in Bydgoszcz was turned into a German school and Polish language removed from classes.

In 1825 the Teacher's Seminary in Bydgoszcz was Germanized as well While in 1824 a Provincial Parliament was invoked in the Grand Duchy of Posen, the representation was based on wealth census, meaning that the result gave most of the power to German minority in the area. Even when Poles managed to issue calls asking for enforcing of the guarantees formulated in treaties of Congress of Vienna and proclamations of Prussian King in 1815 they were rejected by Prussia. Thus neither the attempt to create Polish University in Poznań or Polish Society of Friends of Agriculture, Industry and Education were accepted by authorities. Nevertheless, Poles continued to ask for Polish representation in administration of the area, representing the separate character of the Duchy, keeping the Polish character of schools.

From 1825 the increase of anti-Polish policies became more visible and intense. Prussian political circles demanded end to tolerance of Polishness. Among the Poles two groups emerged, one still hoping for respect of separate status of the Duchy and insisting on working with Prussian authorities hoping that in time they would grant some freedoms. The other faction still hoped for independence of Poland. As consequence many Polish activists were imprisoned. A joint operation of Russian and Prussian secret police managed to discover Polish organizations working in Breslau and Berlin, whose members were arrested and detained in Prussian jails.

=== 1830–1848 ===
Intensification of anti-Polish policies began in 1830. As the November Uprising in Russian-held Congress Poland began, the Prussians closely worked with Russia in regards to stopping any Polish independence drive. A state of emergency was introduced in the Duchy; police surveillance started on a large scale; 80,000 soldiers were moved into the area. The Prussian Foreign Minister openly declared that Prussia would oppose the independence of Poland as it would mean territories taken in the Partitions of Poland could be claimed by it. Russians soldiers fighting Poles received food supplies, equipment, and intelligence from Prussia. Prussian generals wanted to march into Congress Poland, but the threat of French intervention stopped those plans.

In 1830 Eduard Heinrich von Flotwell, a self-declared enemy of Poles, who openly called for Germanization and superiority of German culture over Polish people, became the administrator of the region. Supported by Karl von Grolman, a Prussian general, a program was presented that envisioned removing Poles from all offices, courts, judiciary system, and local administration, controlling the clergy, and making peasants loyal through enforced military service. Schools were to be Germanized as well. Those plans were supported by such prominent public figures such as Carl von Clausewitz, August Neidhardt von Gneisenau, Theodor von Schön, and Wilhelm von Humboldt. By 1830 the right to use Polish in courts and institutions was no longer respected. While the Poles constituted the majority of population in the area, they held only 4 out of 21 official posts of higher level. From 1832 they could no longer hold higher posts at the local administrative level(Landrat). At the same time the Prussian government and Prussian king pursued Germanization of administration and judicial system, local officials enforced Germanization of educational system and tried to eradicate the economic position of Polish nobility. In Bydgoszcz the mayors were all Germans. In Poznań, out of 700 officials, only 30 were Poles.

Another colonization attempt aimed at Germanization was pursued by Prussia after 1831, and while Poles constituted 73% of population in 1815, they were reduced to 60% in 1848. In the same time period, the German presence grew from 25% to 30%. Flotwell initiated programs of German colonization and tried to reduce Polish landownership in favor of Germans. As Encyclopædia Britannica writes "At the end of 1830, however, a new policy was inaugurated with the presidency of E. H. von Flottwell: the experiment of settling subsidized German colonists on Polish soil (started by Frederick the Great after the first partition of Poland) was resumed". Settlement of German colonists were supported especially under the rule of Eduard Flottwell in the years 1831–1840 In the period 1832-1842 the number of Polish holdings was reduced from 1020 to 950 and the German ones increased from 280 to 400. The Jewish minority in the province was exploited by Prussians to gain support for its policies. By granting Jews rights and abolishing old limitations, the Prussians hoped they could integrate the Jewish population into German society, and gain a counterweight to the Polish presence. As a result, many Jews saw in Prussia a free, liberal state, and were opposed to Polish independence movement.

When Frederick William IV's ascended to the throne in 1840, certain concessions were again granted. The German colonization was halted; some schools were able to teach the Polish language again; promises were made to create departments of Polish language in universities in Breslau and Berlin. There were also vague promises about creation of a university in Poznań. This was all that Poles were granted. In reality only the methods changed, while the overall goal of Germanization remained the same, only this time with lighter methods, and by concessions Prussians hoped to assure identification of Poles with the Prussian state and an eventual change of their identity. The concession also were connected to freezing of relations between Prussia and the Russian Empire, with Prussian politicians hoping that Poles could be used to fight Russia on Prussia's behalf.

At this time, the majority of Poles were not yet engaged in political activity. Mostly the landowners, the intelligentsia, and the upper urban classes possessed a developed national consciousness. The peasantry and the working class had yet to experience their own "Polish national awakening." Through military service and school education, and in the case of "regulated" peasants in the wake of the benefits wrought by the final emancipation decree introduced in 1823, some segments of these social groups had begun to identify with the Prussian state. However, as German colonization grew in strength and policies against Polish religion and traditions were introduced the local population begun to feel hostility towards Prussia and the German presence. Economic factors also began to influence Polish-German relations. Colonization policies in particular created a fear of German competition among Poles. The greatest difference remained the religious segregation. The local Germans displayed rather politically apathy and refrained from creating an organized form of social life. Prior to 1848, the provincial Diet remained the only forum of German political activity. In general, relations of the local Germans with the Polish population were good.

In the end of the 1840s about 60 percent of the population of the Duchy were Polish, 34 percent German and 6 percent Jewish. Out of the administrative districts, Poles had a majority in 18, while Germans had a majority in 6, out which 4 were in the western part and 2 in the northern part.

A first attempt to change the situation in the Duchy was made in the Greater Poland Uprising of 1846 after which 254 Polish activists were imprisoned upon charges of conspiracy. The trial ended on 2 December 1847, when 134 of the defendants were acquitted and returned to the Duchy. Eight defendants, including Ludwik Mierosławski, were sentenced to death, the rest to prison in the Berlin-Moabit prison. The death sentences were not carried out as Revolution in Prussia started and the Prussian king granted amnesty to political prisoners as part of concessions to the revolutionaries.

== Timeline of the uprising ==
=== Prelude ===
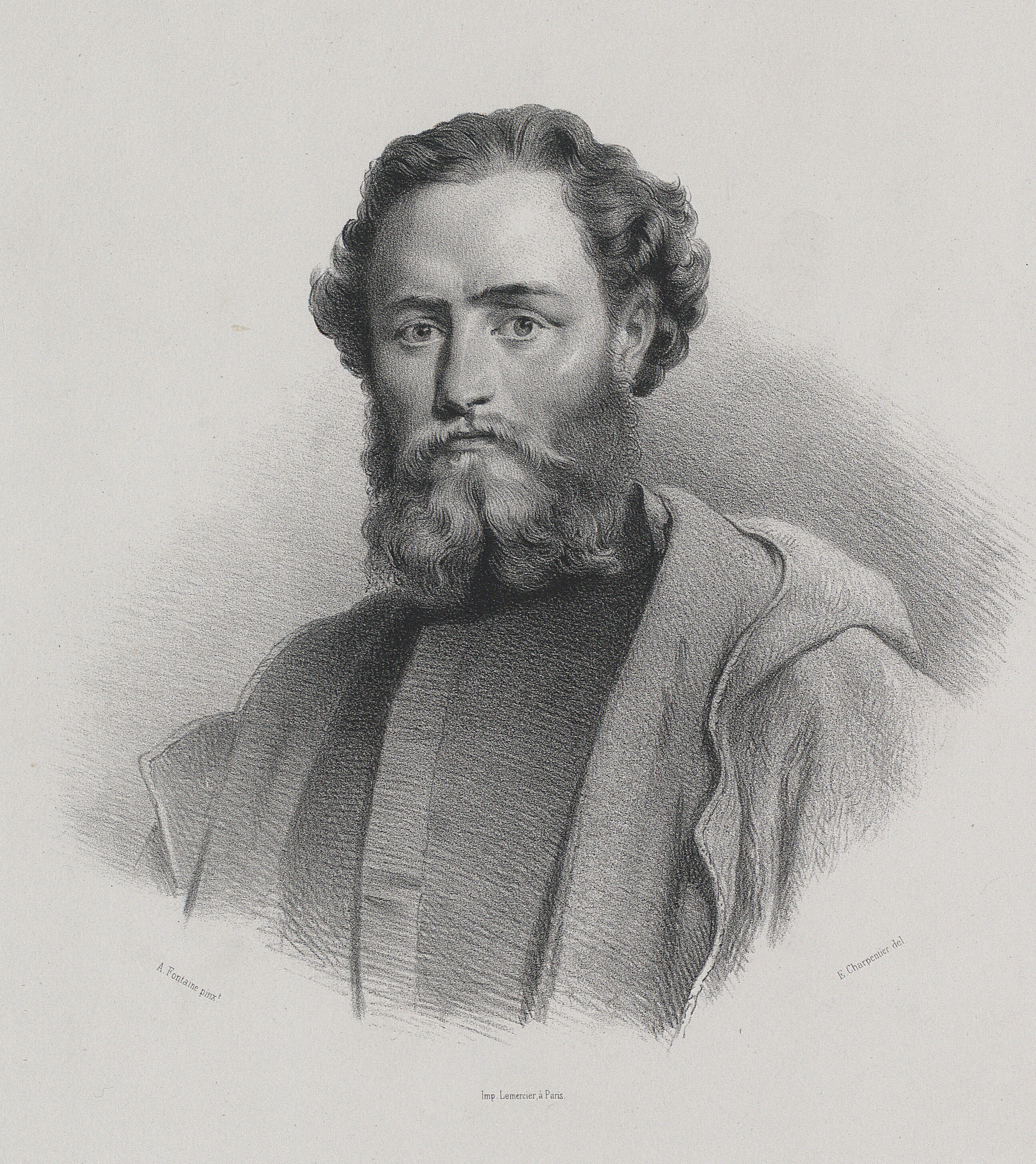
Ludwik Mierosławski

On 19 March 1848, after the Revolution in Berlin succeeded throughout the Spring of Nations, King Frederick William IV of Prussia granted amnesty to the Polish prisoners, who joined the Berlin Home Guard in the evening of 20 March 1848 by founding a "Polish Legion" in the courtyard of the Berlin Palace, and were armed with weapons from the Royal Prussian Arsenal. Ludwik Mierosławski waved the Black-Red-Gold flag of the German Revolution and the prisoners were celebrated by the public. Speeches during the demonstration were made about a joint fight against the Russian Empire for a free and united Germany and an independent Poland. Karol Libelt noted from Berlin that he was under the impression that the whole people wanted a free and independent Poland to serve as a German shield against Russia and that the Polish question would soon be resolved. Volunteers from Berlin tried to join this legion and support the Polish struggle for liberty, with the expectation that the Legion would fight against the Russian rule in Congress Poland, but these volunteers were rejected. Polish emigrants to France, like Adam Czartoryski, who returned to join that legion were allowed to use Prussian railways for free and often received with cheers, e.g. by the revolutionary committees in Cologne French politicians granted money for those trips hoping to remove Polish influence from France, for fear of revolutionary actions. Additionally the French incited Poles to start uprising, as they wanted to secure a diversionary element in case the Holy Alliance would turn its forces against France.

=== Initial phase ===
Map of the insurgent activity during the uprising

The uprising in Poznań had started on 20 March 1848, and inspired by the events in Berlin, a demonstration in Poznań was organized. As the authorities agreed to creation of a delegation that would bring proposals from the Polish side to Berlin and to the Prussian king, the Polish National Committee was created in Poznań. The Polish historian Jerzy Zdrada wrote that the delegates postulated independence of Polish territories but arriving in Berlin decided to remove that demand, and replaced it with "national reorganization," removal of Prussian military, and turning over the administration to Poles. Zdrada notes that those demands were to the liking of the Berlin Revolutionary Committee which wanted Poles as a force to fight Russia. According to the English historian Norman Davies, the political demands of the committee were for effective autonomy, not for independence. The organized militia was intended for use not against Prussia but against the threat of Russian intervention. The Committee represented various political orientations and social classes, in order to achieve a coalition character. Its overall character was liberal-democratic, and among land-owners and intellectualists it included a Polish peasant Jan Palacz. The Polish Committee restricted its membership to Poles and demands from Germans and Jews to be represented in the Polish Committee were not accepted

On 21 March a joint demonstration of Germans and Poles took place. Germans often wore both the Black-Red-Gold cockade and the Polish Red-White as a revolutionary symbol. On March 21, the National Committee released a proclamation calling for a common struggle seeking understanding with the Germans, and a day later recognized the rights of Jews . According to Zdrada on the same day the Prussian general Friedrich August Peter von Colomb ordered Prussian soldiers to take the Bazar, a hotel which was the center of Polish activities. This was avoided as it would result in Polish-Prussian confrontation-something that the liberals in Berlin didn't yet desire. On 22 March the German-controlled Poznań city council voted to support the postulates of the National Committee in Berlin. While Poles avoided possible confrontation in the event of raising the question of independence and demanded national reorganization instead, the Germans called for separation of the Duchy from Prussia. Meanwhile, the Polish Legion arrived on 28 March 1848 from Berlin to Poznań, where Mierosławski took over military command, and Jedrzej Moraczewski, a member of the Polish Committee, ordered on 28 March: "One should make every effort not to alarm the Germans in order to avoid a strong reaction from their side. On the other hand it is necessary to maintain supremacy over them.

The reason for initial support of Poles by Prussians and Germans was the fear of Russian intervention which would stop creation of strong unified Germany. Germans saw in Poles an opportunity to create a diversion stopping Russians from intervention in Germany itself. The hostility to Russia manifested by Poles was the base of German sympathy towards Polish aspiration during the initial phase of the Uprising. Karl Wilhelm von Willisen encouraged Mierosławski to fight a war against Russia. The Prussian foreign minister von Arnim used the Polish issue as weapon against Russia. Leading German politicians and thinkers supported using Poles as protection against Russia, such as Karl August Varnhagen, Robert Blum, Heinrich von Gagern, Georg Gervinius, Johann Wirth and Constantin Frantz.

=== From cooperation to confrontation ===
As the threat of war with Russia grew distant, the German elites and society became hostile to Polish aspirations. Polish successes created distrust in local Germans, and they felt threatened. The news of national reorganization of the province was the turning-point. The assumption of power by a Polish administration and the creation of a military corps out of local Polish population created a fear among Germans for their position in a Polish-ruled Duchy. Within a few days, the Polish movement embraced the whole Greater Poland region. Polish peasants and urban citizens turned against Prussian officials. Polish nobility and peasantry took up arms, preparing for confrontation with Prussian Army; Prussian symbols were torn down; in a couple of places fighting erupted with German colonists. In Pomerelia, constituting the bulk of the former Province of West Prussia, the Polish population took inspiration from events in Greater Poland and openly turned against Prussian officials, led by Natalis Sulerzyski and Seweryn Elżanowski. In Chełmno a Temporary National Committee of Polish Prussia was formed. By the end of March, though, local Germans turned harshly against Poles, and together with Prussian military pacified the area, while Polish leaders were imprisoned.

Overnight, Poles turned Germans from an ally against Russia into the enemy that would threaten German control over Greater Poland and Pomerania. The atmosphere among the Germans and a portion of the Jewish population began to change diametrically. A German National Committee was founded on 23 March, and a second one on 27 March, largely influenced by German public officials loyal to the Prussian king. Nationalist and even chauvinist voices could be heard in Germany demanding incorporation of the whole Greater Poland into the German Confederation. Encroachments against Jews caused a further support of the German Committee by the Jewish population and the breakdown of Prussian authority allowed long-simmering resentments to explode, as the German Committee urged in a complaint addressed to the Polish Committee: "There have been many cases in which armed groups of your people have threatened and violated the property and personal security of your German-speaking neighbors. Keep in mind that through such acts of infamous violence you stain the honor of your nation and you undermine the sympathy for your cause among the nations of Germany and Europe." The new German Committee that emerged in Poznań subsequently engaged in consistent opposition to Polish movement. Separate German National Committees were established, and petitions demanding the division of the Duchy and the incorporation of cities and counties into German Confederation were addressed to Berlin. With the army protecting them, Germans started to paralyze development of Polish self-rule. German officials, colonists, and tradesmen seized the opportunity and begun counteraction, demanding incorporation of the Polish territories into a unified German state, and accusing Poles of repression. Their claims were methodically used by German propaganda to win support of European countries such as Great Britain and France. Additionally, German liberals turned against Poles, demanding "protection of German area." Soon, German craftsmen, traders, and colonists in communities began to form committees and paramilitary units to defend their interests and to prevent local Poles from organizing, often joined by local Jews. They started to besiege the Prussian King with petitions to exclude their areas from the planned political reorganization. By late April, about 8,000 German civilians of the Noteć(Netze) district north of Poznań were organized in paramilitary units and another 6,000 around the towns of Międzyrzecz (Meseritz) and Nowy Tomyśl (Neutomischel).

=== Attempts to reach compromise ===
On 23 March the Prussian king granted an audience to Polish delegation and verbally declared his agreement to their proposals for autonomy; at the same time in confidential conversation with Prussian military commanders he ordered them to prepare an invasion of Polish territories to crush the Polish movement. On 24 March the Prussian king issued a declaration that promised the short-dated reorganization of the province and the creation of a commission of both nationalities, whose aim would be the consideration of interests of both nations. The Poles understood those measures as restoration of autonomy. Local Polish committees were formed, Prussian state treasuries requisitioned, and symbols of Prussian state dismantled. In many places the local landrats were removed from power. As John Fane, 11th Earl of Westmorland, a British diplomat in Berlin, reported on 6 April 1848, "great excesses had been committed by armed bands of Poles, headed by some of the Nobles and Refugees, who have pillaged and set fire to country seats and farm houses and rendered themselves guilty of other depredations which the Government will endeavour to repress by moveable columns of Troops". Berlin authorities tried to delay the course of events by proposing the division of the province into two parts. Additionally they tried to convince Poles that creation of Polish military formations would hinder the talks about autonomy. Meanwhile the Poles, began to create armed units on 22 March based on decision of the Polish National Committee, which in the meantime changed its name to Polish Central Committee. On 28 March Ludwik Mierosławski took command of military supply and organization, in which he was supported by Polish émigré officers. Fearing intervention by the Russian Empire in a Prussia wracked by liberal revolt, Poles were preparing for a joint defense with Prussian forces against possible Russian attack. Prince Adam Czartoryski came to Berlin for political talks, and general Ignacy Prądzyński prepared plans for possible war with Russia.

In the beginning of April the local Poznań Parliament voted 26 to 17 votes against joining the German Confederation on 3 April 1848. The German minority in Greater Poland through German National Committee declared that it rejected any notion of Polish-German brotherhood and Germans would not abandon control, even if the Polish state was re-established. On 4 April Prussian military declared a stage of siege in Poznań.

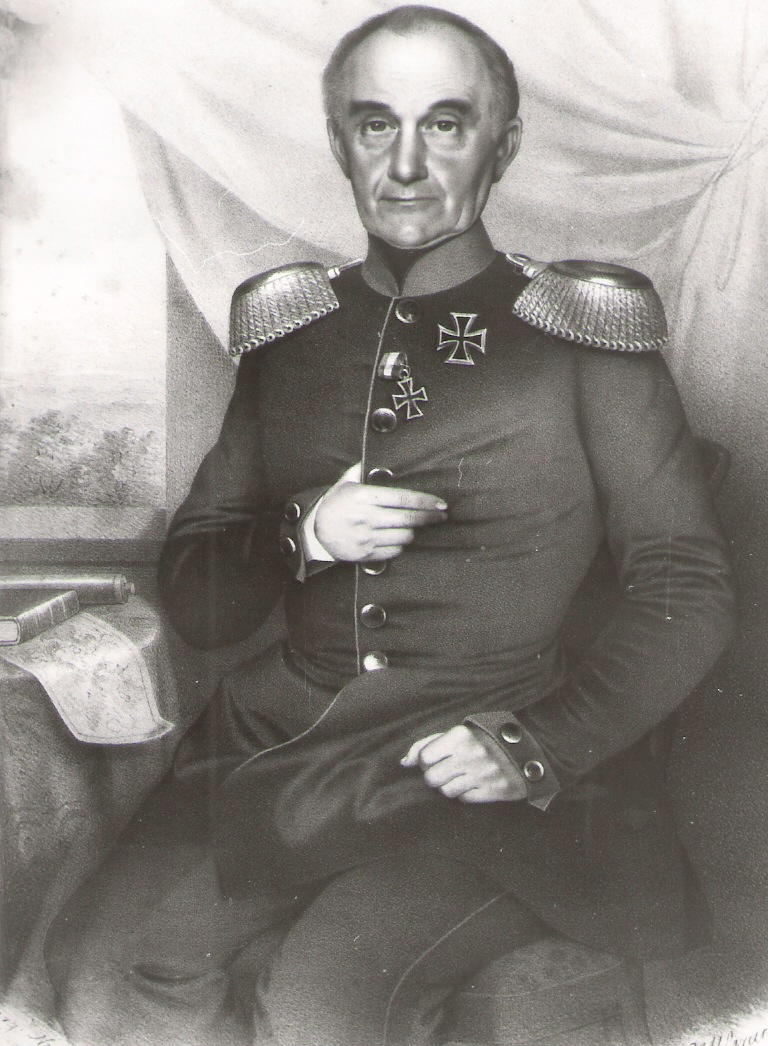
Karl Wilhelm von Willisen

On 5 April the new "Royal Civil Commissioner for the Province Posen", Karl Wilhelm von Willisen, a figure claiming to be sympathetic to the Polish cause, arrived at Poznań and his early actions disappointed the Germans greatly. Willisen soon came into conflict with the military commander of Poznań, general Friedrich August Peter von Colomb, who opposed any kind of Polish independence efforts. Willisen declared that Poles would be granted autonomy but they have to reduce their forces, which on beginning of April counted 7,000 people. A compromise was reached on 11 April in Jarosławiec, when Willisen permitted the Poles to have four military camps counting 720 people each (In the end the number of people in the camps was around 4,000).

=== Breakdown of negotiations ===
On 14 April the Prussian king declared that ten northern and western counties out of the 24 counties of the province would not take part in the planned political reorganization; on 26 April this was extended to parts of further six counties, including the City of Poznań itself, leaving to Poles only nine counties. To all involved parties it was obviously a temporary solution and unacceptable to Poles as out of the administrative districts Poles had majority in eighteen while Germans in six, of which four were in the western part and two in the northern part. Willisen himself left Poznań on 20 April, blamed for treason and having "betrayed the German cause" and as a contemporary eyewitness wrote "Willisen was exposed to personal insults or even danger from the infuriated German and Jewish mobs of Posen" . Not long after he was relieved of his duties and replaced by Ernst von Pfuel, who arrived in Poznań early May.

The Polish National Committee had decided to disarm its forces, but this determination was ignored by Mierosławski who expected a Russian intervention in which they would assist Prussian forces in defense as an ally. As such they were unprepared to fight the Prussians.

=== Outbreak of military hostilities ===
The demobilized Polish militia was harassed by German forces and several Poles were either murdered or wounded. Demobilized Poles returning to their homes were being harassed as were Catholic priests, while Germans pacified villages. This provoked an outrage in Polish peasants who rose up against Prussian forces in rural uprising and guerrilla warfare, and joined the regular Polish forces under Mierosławski. Mierosławski believed that to save morale and honor of Poles it was necessary to resist militarily, while the Committee members were opposed to fighting, and as such the Committee disbanded itself on 30 April, in its last proclamation stressing the Prussian treachery and violence. As the Prussian troops lashed unrestricted terror against the Polish population, the Prussian attack started on 29 April as camps in Książ, Pleszew, Września and Miłosław were assaulted. In Książ, Prussian troops destroyed the town after murdering 600 prisoners and wounded Among the victims of the massacre was Florian Dąbrowski Additionally the population of Grodzisk led by Jewish doctor Marcus Mosse defended the town against encroaching 600 Prussian troops. Polish committees in Wielkopolska were being attacked as well. According to Jerzy Kozłowski a particular role in the conflict was played by German colonists who formed their own militia, engaging in acts of terror against Polish population. Witold Matwiejczyk claims these colonists came from previous settlement efforts by Prussian government which intensified efforts to settle Germans into Poznań region after 1815, and were hostile towards the Polish movement, but initially fearing Russian intervention kept a low profile During the conflict the colonists formed military formations called Schutzvereine and Schutzwache and not only accompanied Prussian military in pacifying Polish villages but also engaged in acts on their own initiative German colonists were particularly active in Szczytno region and in Czarnkowski region formed their own militia unit where a local German military commander known for his anti-Polish attitude managed to organize several hundred colonists into paramilitary units and took over Czarnkow from Polish forces

=== Battle of Miłosław ===
On 30 April Ludwik Mierosławski successfully defeated Prussian forces at the Battle of Miłosław; after winning at Książ, Prussian general Blumen commanding 2500 soldiers and four cannons, encroached on Miłosław where Ludwik Mierosławski was located along with 1200 soldiers and four cannons. The Prussian forces divided themselves into two columns—one moving from Środa, the other from Września.

Initially Mierosławski engaged in talks with Blumen, but when he received news that Poles from Nowe Miasto under the command of Józef Garczyński were coming to help him with 1000 soldiers and that additional reinforcements of 1200 soldiers were moving from Pleszew under the command of Feliks Białoskórski, he broke off the negotiations. As a consequence the battle started.

In the first phase of the battle, Polish forces were driven out of Miłosław and took positions along two sides of the main road. In pursuit of retreating Poles, Blumen ordered a cavalry assault. The Prussian pursuit was stopped however by the arrival of Garczyński, and when Białoskórki's soldiers arrived the Poles counterattacked.

The second phase was dominated by a Polish counterattack along the line of the main road and attack by cavalry units before the Prussians were able to attack Polish positions. Afterwards the Poles re-entered the town and the Prussians were forced to retreat. However, the Poles were exhausted and were not able to pursue the retreating Prussians, causing the victory to not be exploited to its full potential. Polish losses counted 200 soldiers while the Prussians 225.

=== Further fighting and end of the Uprising ===
The uprising was focused in Greater Poland but it also reached out to Pomerelia where Natalis Sulerzeski organized Polish armed forces and together with Ignacy Łyskowski arranged a meeting in Wębrzyn of Polish delegates was organized who created the Provisional Committee of Polish Prussia. It was to start talks on reorganization of the Western Prussia provinces on 5 April in Chełmno, but it never came to that, as Prussians arrested most of its members and put them in prison in Grudziądz. Seweryn Elżanowski in response organized a military formation counting several hundred people which took part in combat near Tuchola Forest after which it moved into Greater Poland. On 2 May the Polish kosynierzy defeated a Prussian column near Września at the village of Sokołowo, but the victory resulted in heavy losses. Prussians managed to defeat Polish forces in Mosina, Rogalin, Stęszew, Kórnik, Buk, Oborniki. Mierosławski tendered his resignation as the commander of the Polish forces on 6 May and the new Supreme commander, Augustyn Brzezanski, capitulated on 9 May. The act of capitulation was signed in Bardo near Września.

== Aftermath and legacy ==
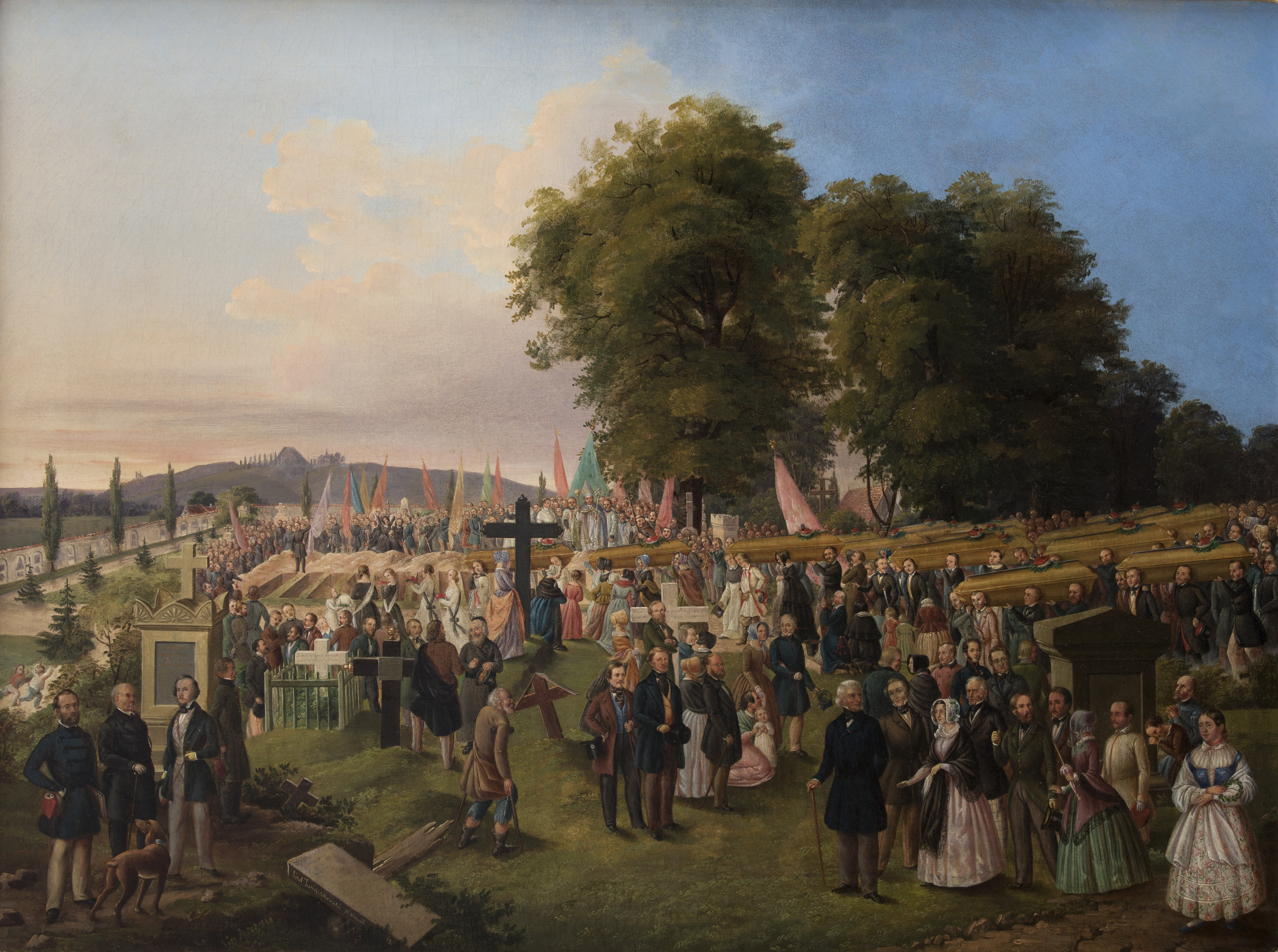
Funeral services held in Posen for commemoration of the fallen (J. Zajączkowski)

The events of the failed Uprising inspired Polish movement. A crucial point was that, unlike in the Kingdom of Galicia and Lodomeria or in Congress Poland, the peasantry took active and decisive part on behalf of Polish resistance. The Polish peasants had seen in German colonization a primary threat to their national and social interests.

The uprising also showed to Poles that there was no possibility to negotiate with Germans regarding Polish statehood. The so-called "Polen-Debatte" in the Frankfurt Parliament in July 1848 concerned the issue of Poland and showed the attitude of German politicians regarding this. They opposed Poland and any concessions to Poles in Poznań. Those who in the past have claimed to be friendly towards Poles, rejected all of their former declarations and called them mistakes and the idea of restored Poland "insanity". At the same time the demands of German representatives were not only directed against Poland, they also wanted a war with Denmark, opposed autonomy for Italians in South Tyrol, called Alsace-Lorraine German, and talked about German interests in the Baltic provinces of Russia.

=== Repressions ===
1,500 Poles were imprisoned in Poznań Citadel, mostly peasants who took part in the fighting, their heads shaved bald and branded by Prussian authorities by chemical substance which scarred them with permanent wounds on hands, ears and faces. Overall the prisoners were abused with repeated beatings and degrading treatment taking place Stefan Kieniewicz, a Polish historian, in his scholarly work analysing the Uprising published in 1935 and republished in 1960, writes that blame for this was shifted between Colomb and his lower-ranking officers, the incident was widely publicised by Polish press . Mierosławski himself, whose mother was French and who lived in Paris prior to 1846, was released after a French diplomatic protest and commanded German insurgent units in the Baden Revolution and the Palatine Uprising in 1849 during the Revolutions of 1848 in the German states.

The Grand Duchy of Posen was subsequently replaced with the Province of Posen and the Prussian government rejected any ideas of autonomy. As a Prussian Province it was set to be completely incorporated into the German Confederation, however when the Frankfurt Parliament finalized the German Constitution on 28 March 1849 neither the Province of Posen nor West Prussia were mentioned. Formal integration of Polish lands into Germany was thus avoided for another 17 years until the North German Confederation was established in 1866.

=== Polish resistance ===
The post-uprising repressions spawned defensive reactions within the Polish society. Some favored an armed struggle for independence and formed the Poznan Committee (Kormitet Poznanski), which represented the democratically oriented landowners and intellectuals, or the socialist Society of Plebeians (Zwiazek Plebejuszy). Both organizations worked for an uprising that would encompass all three parts of the partitioned Poland. Other Polish activists, mostly members of the landed gentry and the intelligentsia, abandoned armed insurrection and began to propagate a doctrine of organic work by strengthening the economic potential and educational level, calling "Now we will go against Prussians not with scythes but with votes" and decided to focus their energy on increasing their economic and political position before deciding for military confrontation.

In the elections to the Prussian Landtag in May 1849 Polish delegates achieved 16 out of the 30 seats of the Province of Posen. Three Polish representatives were also elected from Pomerelia, they were led by Ignacy Łyskowski, a landlord and journalist, who printed a Polish newspaper Szkółka Narodowa in Chełmno. Gustaw Gizewiusz was elected from Masuria in East Prussia but he died soon after. In Silesia, a Polish pastor Józef Szafranek was also elected to the Prussian parliament. The attempted elections in the Polish lands to the German Constitutional Parliament were in turn largely boycotted by Polish parties in protest against the incorporation efforts.

For 70 years Poles in Greater Poland would work on developing their organization, increasing wealth and development of Polish lands. The first organization to do so was Polish League created in Summer 1848. Made by liberal politicians it was led by Count August Cieszkowski-writer and philosopher. Its aims were the increasing of national self-awareness among Polish population, rising its life standards and defense of Catholic faith and Polish-owned land. By Autumn 1848 it counted already 40,000 members. Its main directorate was led by Count Gustaw Potworowski. The organization supported agricultural reforms by Polish rural dwellers, and spread information connected to improving agriculture as well as strengthening civic unity. While it was completely legal and didn't violate any laws, the Prussian government disbanded it in 1850. In practice its members continued to work and soon numerous successor organizations were founded leading way to Polish resistance in the Prussian Partition of Poland based on economic and legal opposition. In Silesia the movement from Greater Poland reached out to Józef Lompa and Emanuel Smołka who organized the Polish national movement in Upper and Lower Silesia. The 1848 was also a turning point for Polish national movement in Pomerelia, which gained support of city inhabitants and Polish peasants, and especially strong support among Polish clergy, who were subjected to hostile policies by the German bishopric in Pelplin. The Polish national movement in Pomerelia decided after those events to pursue its goals by legal means, and remained in this position until World War I The Polish activists from Pomerelia soon came in contact with Masurs and Gustaw Gizewiusz, who encouraged Masurs to defend their local traditions and language.

== Famous insurrectionists ==
- Tytus Działyński (1796–1861)
- Karol Libelt (1807–1875)
- Władysław Niegolewski (1819–1885)

== Bibliography ==
- Topolski Jerzy, Trzeciakowski Lech (red.) Dzieje Poznania, tom II cz. 1 1793-1918, Warszawa-Poznań 1994, Państwowe Wydawnictwo Naukowe ISBN 83-01-11393-6
- Trzeciakowska Maria, Trzeciakowski Lech, W dziewiętnastowiecznym Poznaniu. Życie codzienne miasta 1815-1914, Poznań 1982, Wydawnictwo Poznańskie ISBN 83-210-0316-8
- Społeczeństwo polskie w powstaniu poznańskiem 1848 roku Towarzystwo Naukowe Warszawskie, Warsaw, 1935 Kieniewicz Stefan
- O powstaniu wielkopolskim 1848 roku Władysław Bortnowski, Warszawa Wydawnictwo Ministerstwa Obrony Narodowej, 1952.
- Polska Wiosna Ludów, Koberdowa I., Warszawa 1967;
- Niemieccy koloniści wobec polskich walk narodowowyzwoleńczych w XIX wieku, Wiesław Caban 1996
