= Głuchowo, Poznań County =

Głuchowo
- Village
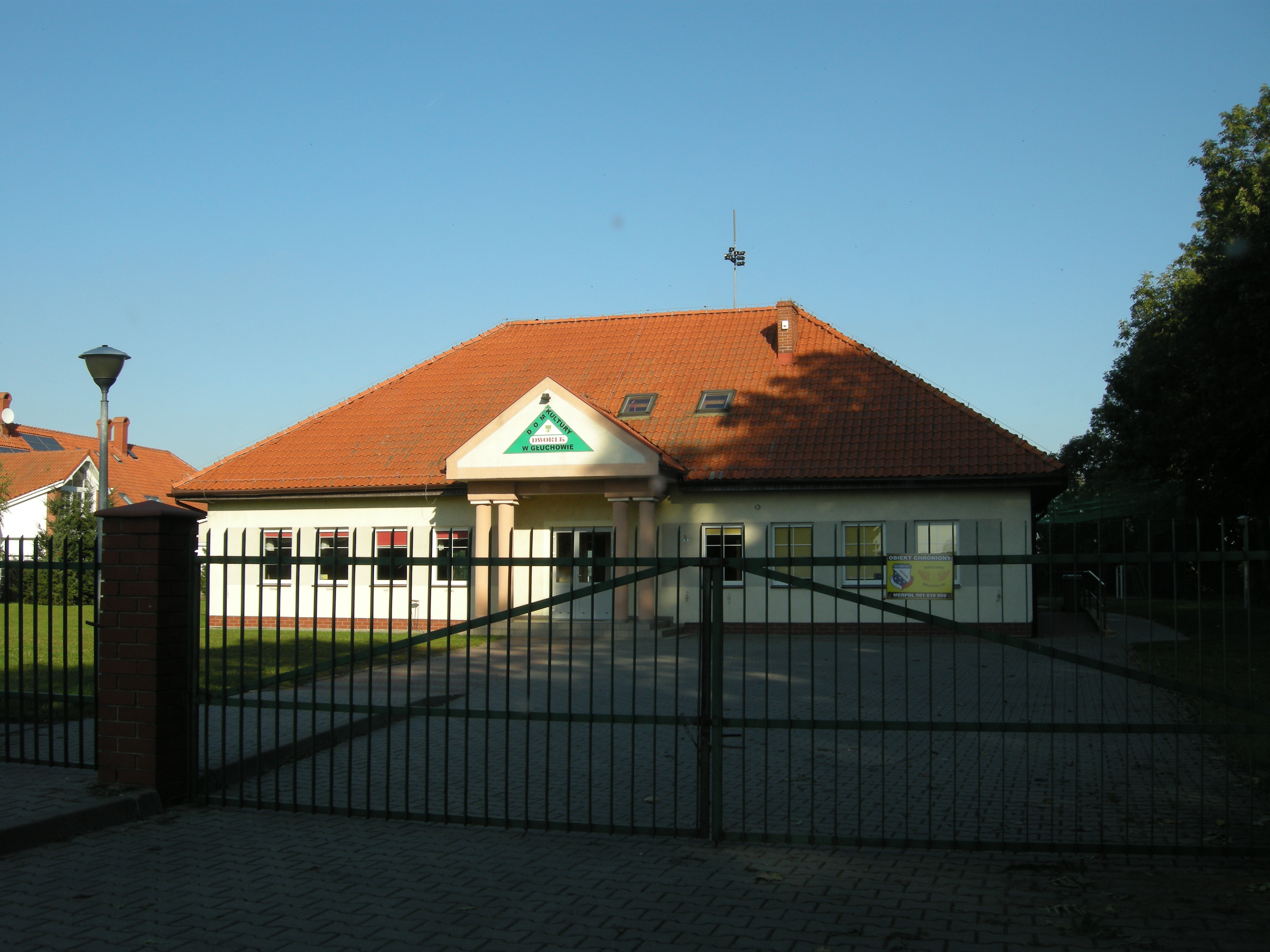
- House of Culture "Dworek" in Głuchów

- Location within Poland
- Coordinates: 52°20′48″N 16°46′12″E
- Country: Poland
- Voivodeship: Greater Poland
- County: Poznań
- Gmina: Komorniki
- Population: 2,560

Głuchowo [ɡwuˈxɔvɔ] is a village in Gmina Komorniki, an administrative district of Poznań County in the Greater Poland Voivodeship, located in west-central Poland.
