= Łęczyca, Greater Poland Voivodeship =

Łęczyca
- Village
- Location within Poland
- Coordinates: 52°18′N 16°52′E
- Country: Poland
- Voivodeship: Greater Poland
- County: Poznań
- Gmina: Komorniki
- Population: 870

Łęczyca (pronounced [wɛnˈt͡ʂɨt͡sa]) is a village in the administrative district of Gmina Komorniki, within Poznań County, Greater Poland Voivodeship, in west-central Poland.
