= Władysław Marcinkowski =

Polish sculptor (1858–1947)

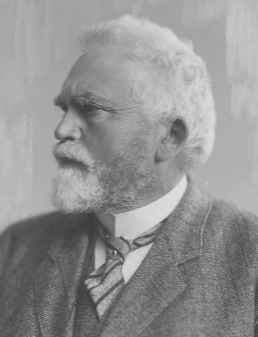
- Marcinkowski in 1929
- Born: June 16, 1858; Mieszków, Greater Poland Voivodeship
- Died: December 10, 1947 (aged 89); Poznań, Poland
- Occupation: Sculptor

Władysław Marcinkowski (June 16, 1858 – December 10, 1947) was a Polish sculptor who created a monument of Adam Mickiewicz in Miłosław.
