= Miłosław =

- Town
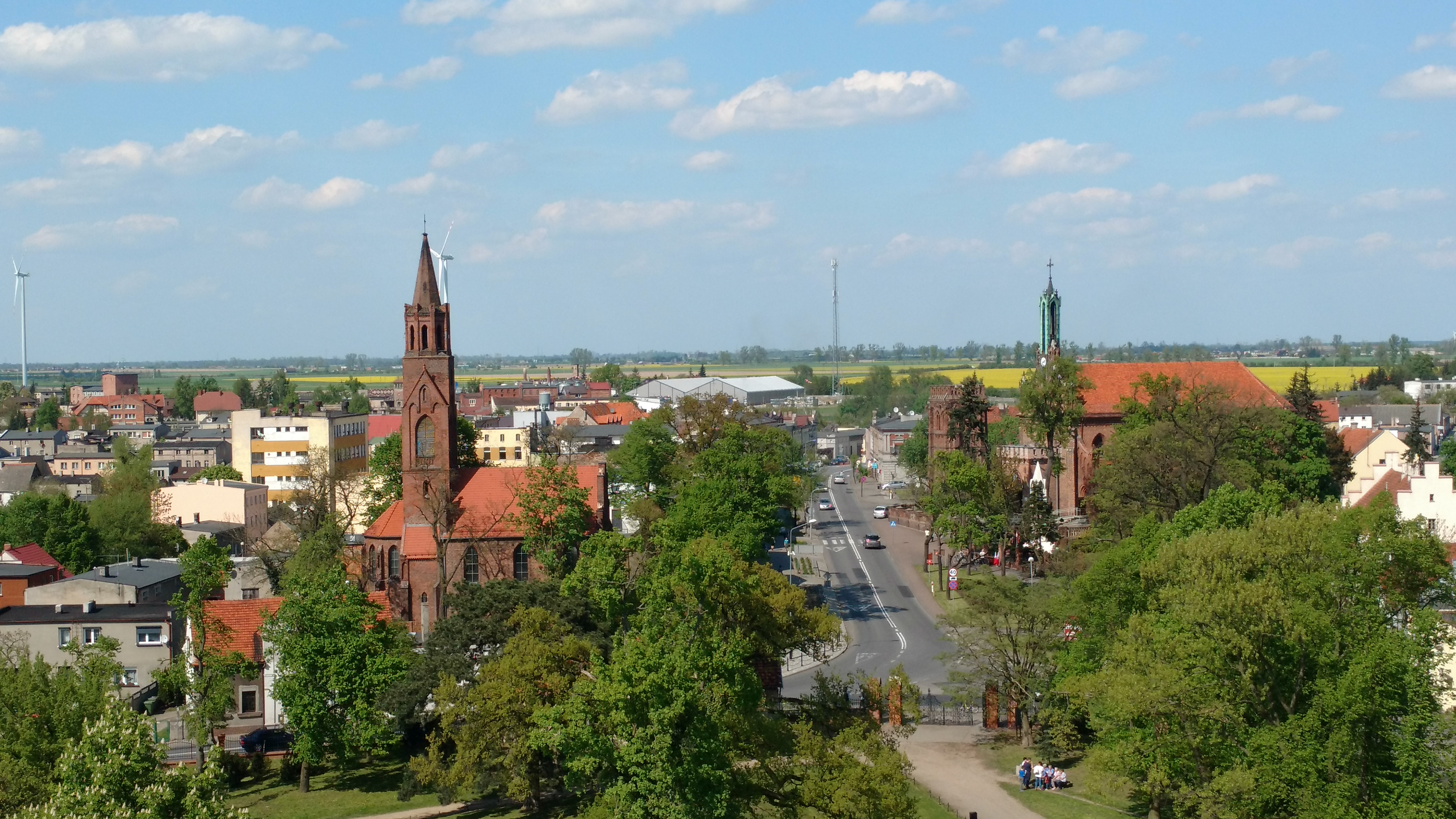
- Panorama of Miłosław from the Miłosław Palace

- Coat of arms

- Location within Poland
- Coordinates: 52°12′24″N 17°28′59″E
- Country: Poland
- Voivodeship: Greater Poland
- County: Września
- Gmina: Miłosław
- First mentioned: 1314
- Town rights: 1397

Government
  - Mayor: Hubert Gruszczyński

Area
  - Total: 4.07 km^{2} (1.57 sq mi)

Population (2012)
  - Total: 3,627
  - Density: 891/km^{2} (2,310/sq mi)
- Time zone: UTC+1 (CET)
  - Summer (DST): UTC+2 (CEST)
- Postal code: 62-320
- Vehicle registration: PWR
- Website: http://www.miloslaw.info.pl

Miłosław [mʲiˈwɔswaf] is a town in Września County, Greater Poland Voivodeship, Poland, with 3,627 inhabitants.

== History ==
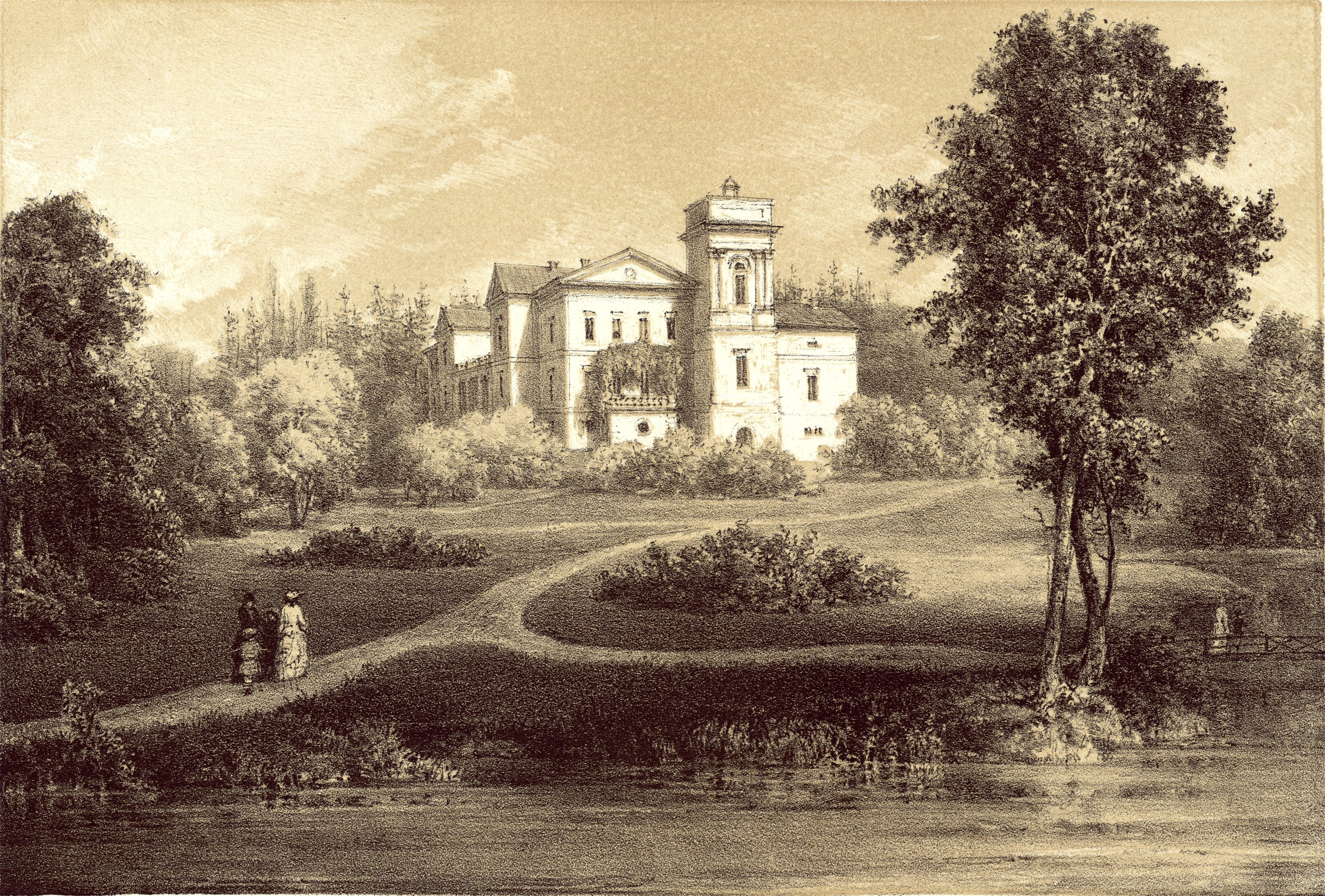
19th-century view of the palace

Miłosław was a private town, administratively located in the Pyzdry County in the Kalisz Voivodeship in the Greater Poland Province of the Kingdom of Poland.

Following the Second Partition of Poland, in 1793, it was annexed by Prussia. After the successful Greater Poland uprising of 1806, it was regained by Poles and included within the Duchy of Warsaw, and after its dissolution, it was re-annexed by Prussia in 1815. A battle between Polish insurgents and Prussian forces took place there during the Greater Poland Uprising of 1848. Following World War I, Poland regained independence and control of the town.

Following the joint German-Soviet invasion of Poland, which started World War II in September 1939, the town was occupied by Germany until 1945. The Polish resistance movement was present in Miłosław. Polish underground press was distributed in the town. In 1943, Paweł Mielcarek, commander of the local unit of the Home Army escaped German arrest to Warsaw, where he continued his underground activities and took part in the Warsaw Uprising.

== Sights ==
The landmarks of Miłosław include the Church of Saint James from 1620, the palace of the Mielżyński and Kościelski noble families with the adjacent Miloslaw Park, the monument to the Polish insurgents fallen in the Battle of Miłosław in 1848, the oldest monument of Polish national poet Juliusz Słowacki, unveiled in 1899 and the school building on Castle Street. Bazar House, located 24 Spring of Nations Square, is also notable.

== Demographics ==
Historical population
Year	Pop.	±%
1921	2,499	—
1931	2,452	−1.9%
2010	3,581	+46.0%

== Gallery ==
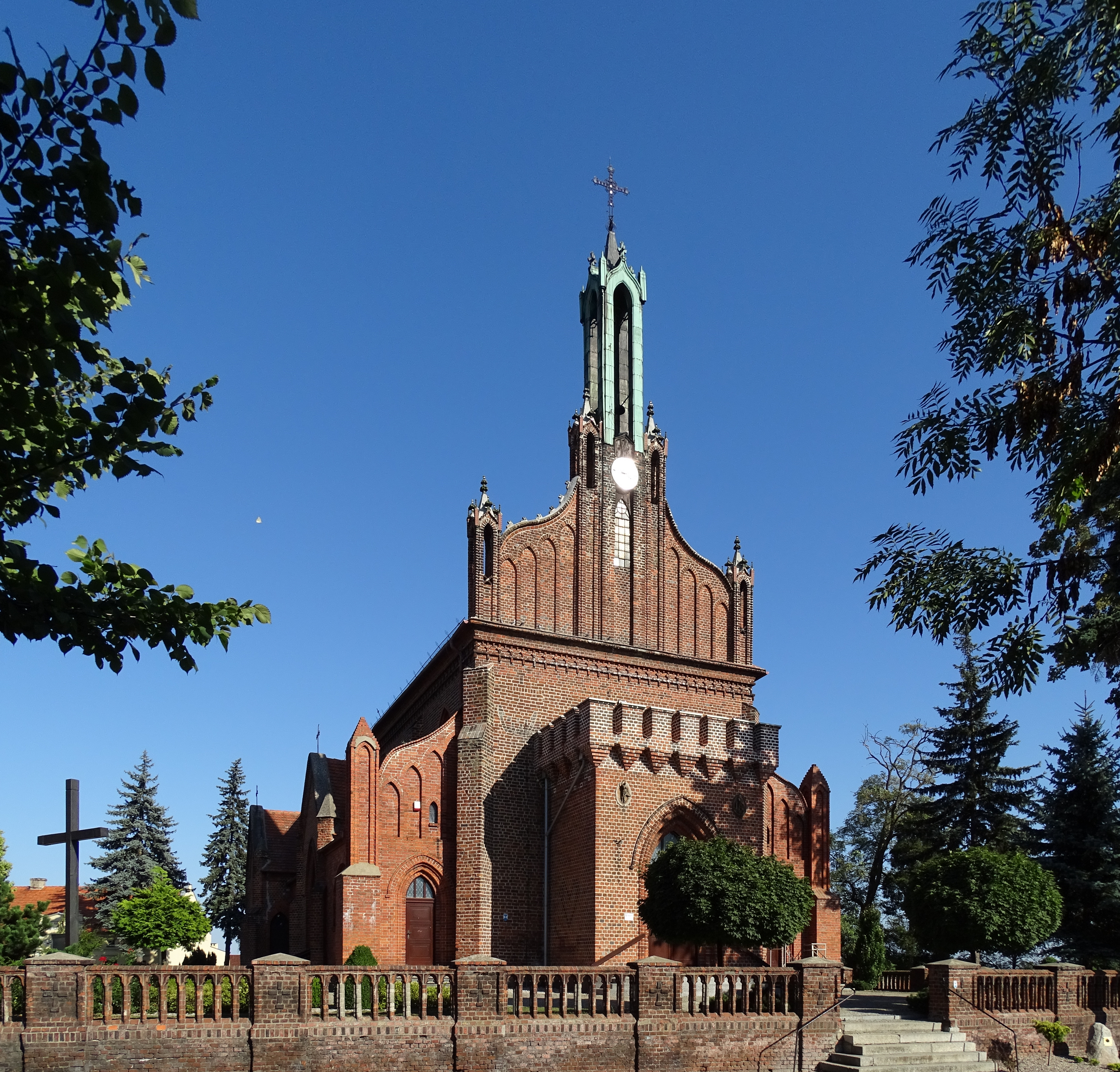
Church of Saint James from 1620

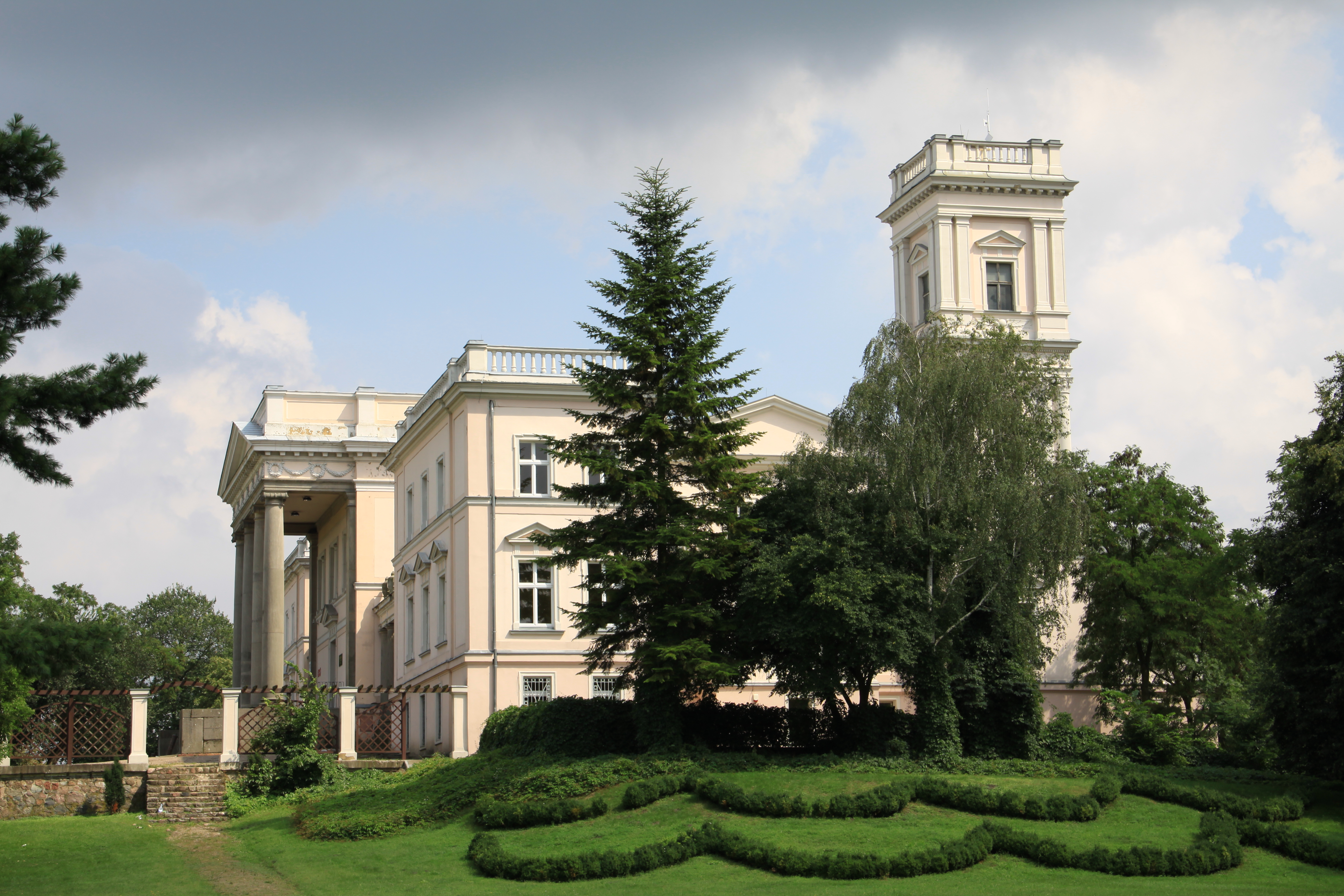
Palace

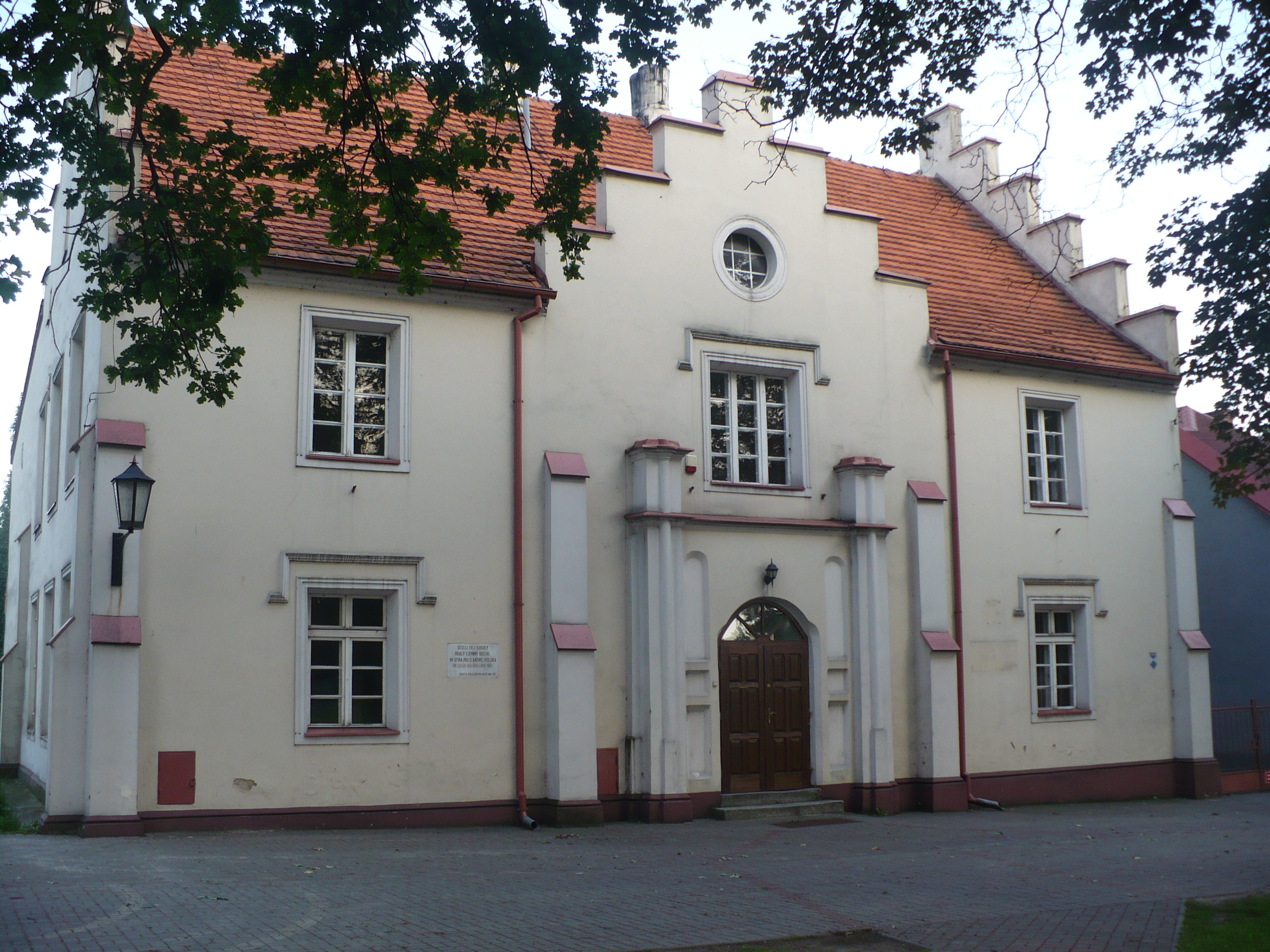
Primary school

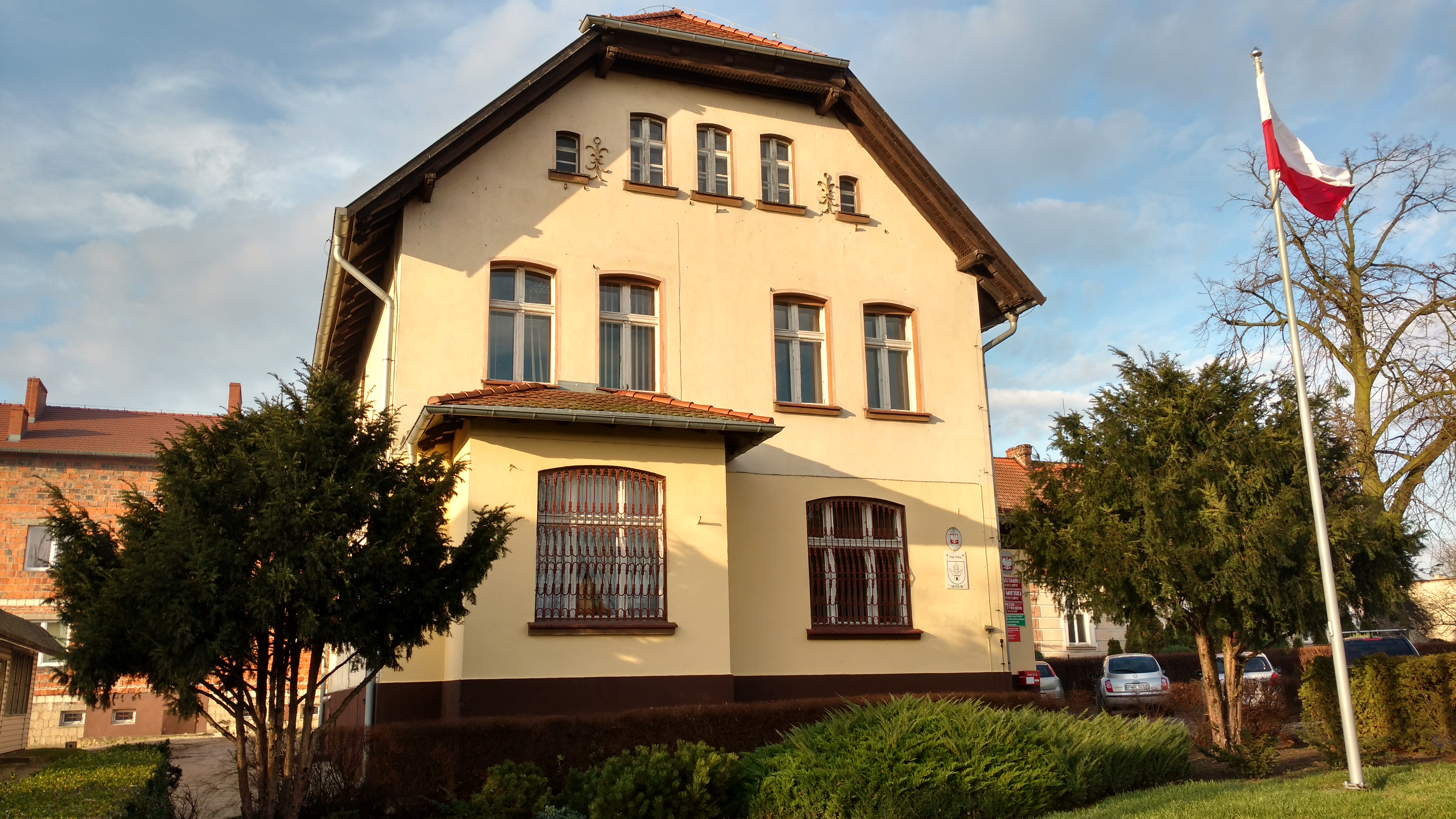
Gmina office
