= Wiry, Greater Poland Voivodeship =

Wiry
- Village
- Location within Poland
- Coordinates: 52°19′21″N 16°51′3″E
- Country: Poland
- Voivodeship: Greater Poland
- County: Poznań
- Gmina: Komorniki
- Population: 2,100

Wiry [ˈvirɨ] is a village in the administrative district of Gmina Komorniki, within Poznań County, Greater Poland Voivodeship, in west-central Poland.

== Culture ==
- Komorniki Festival of Organ and Chamber Music

== Services ==
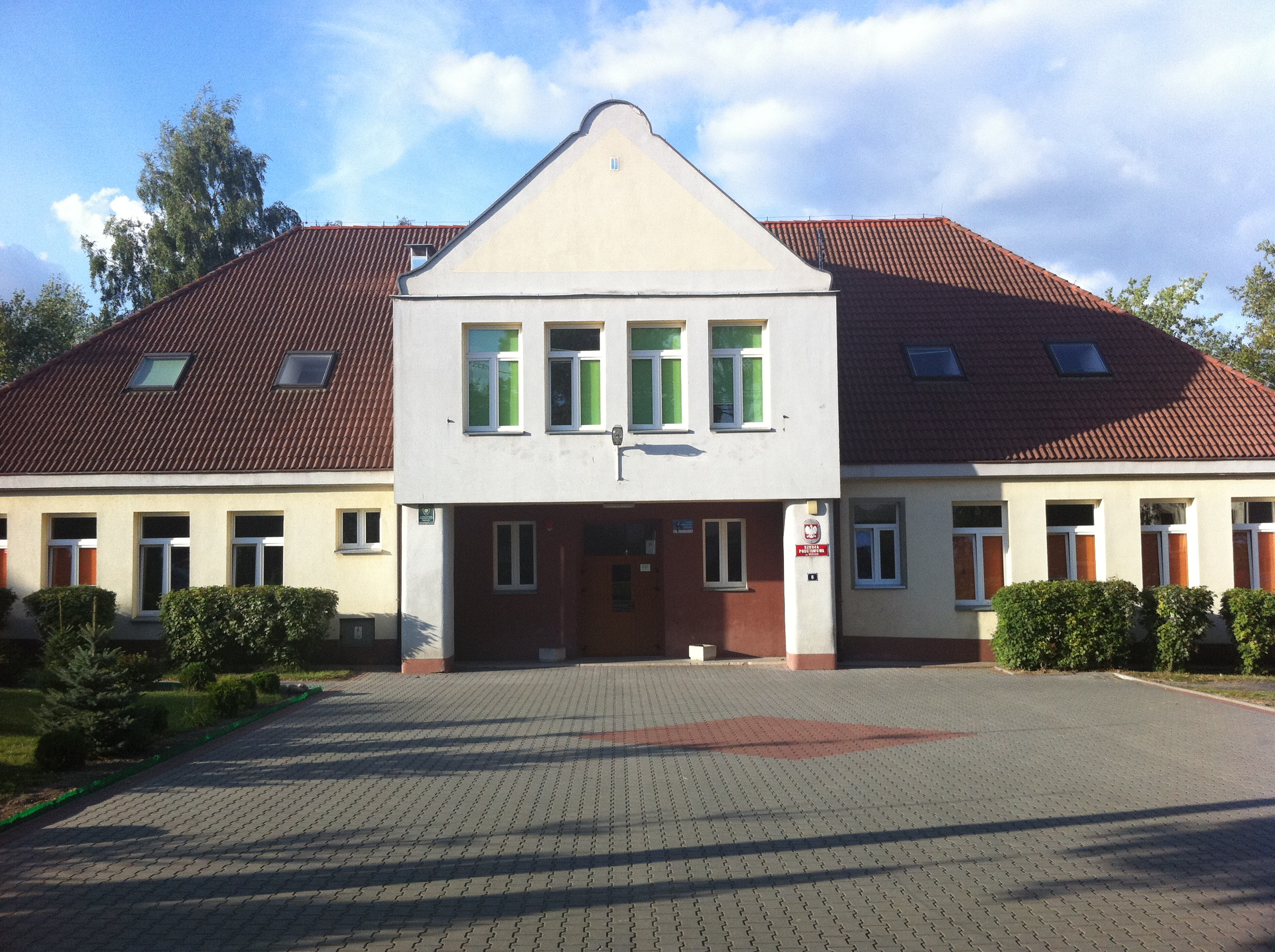
Wiry school

There is a kindergarten, an elementary school that teaches grades "0" through 8, and a community center in Wiry.
