= Friedrich August Peter von Colomb =

Prussian general (1775–1854)

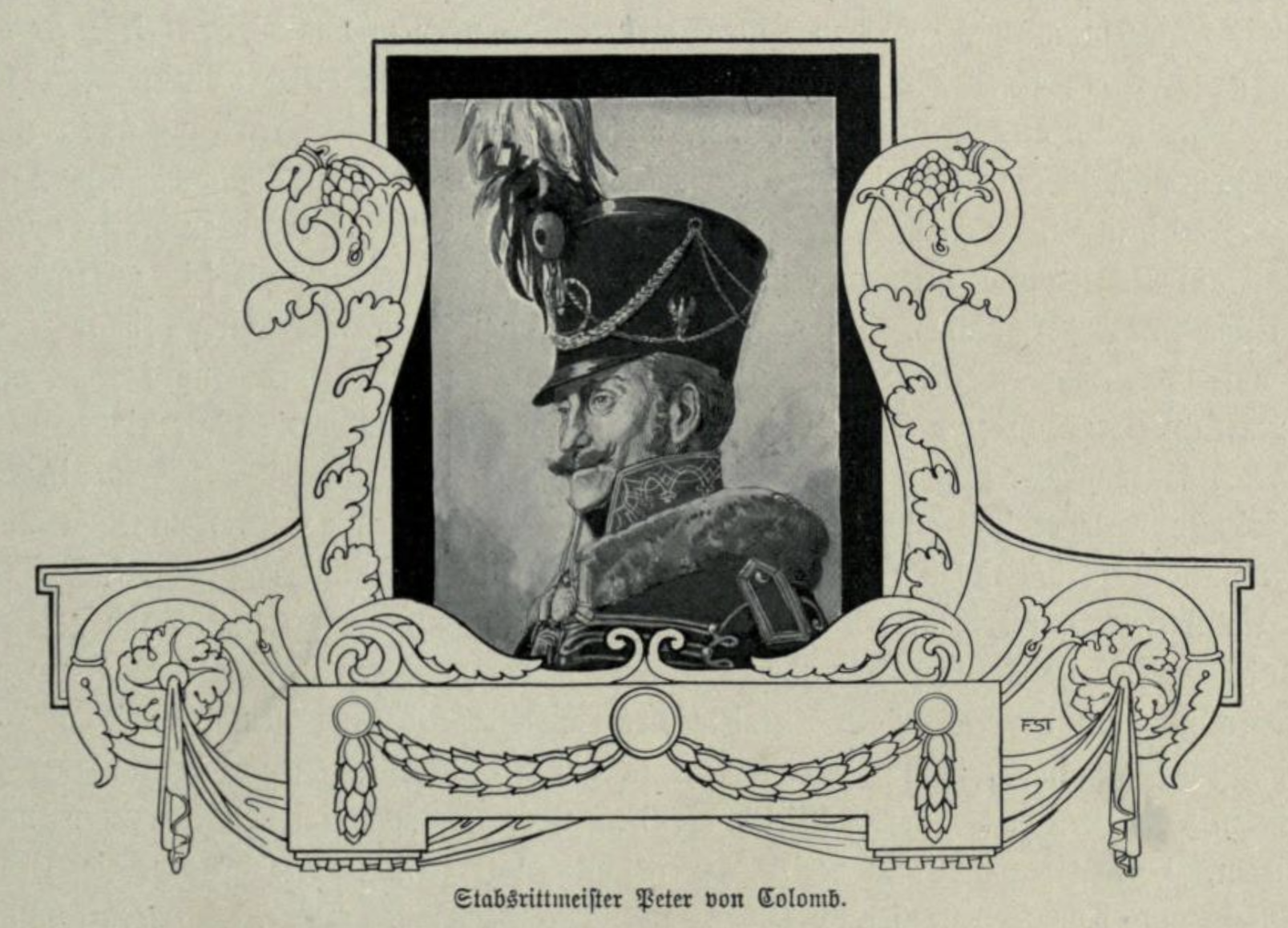
- Franz Stassen: Peter von Colomb
- Born: 19 June 1775; Aurich, Prussia
- Died: 12 November 1854 (aged 79); Königsberg, Prussia
- Relatives: Gebhard Leberecht von Blücher (brother-in-law)
- Military career
- Allegiance: Prussia
- Branch: Cavalry
- Service years: 1792–1849
- Rank: General der Kavallerie
- Conflicts: Napoleonic Wars; War of the First Coalition; War of the Fourth Coalition; Battle of Lubeck; War of the Sixth Coalition; Greater Poland Uprising (1848)

Friedrich August Peter von Colomb (19 June 1775 – 12 November 1854) was a Prussian general.

== Biography ==
Colomb was born in Aurich, Eastern Frisia as a son of the highranking Prussian public official (Geheimer Ober-Finanzrat und Kammerpräsidenten von Aurich) Pierre Colomb (1719–1797; after 1786 Peter von Colomb). His brother Ludwig Christoph von Colomb (1768–1831) was the Royal Prussian President of Breslau. his sister Amalie (1772–1850) married Gebhard Leberecht von Blücher in 1795.

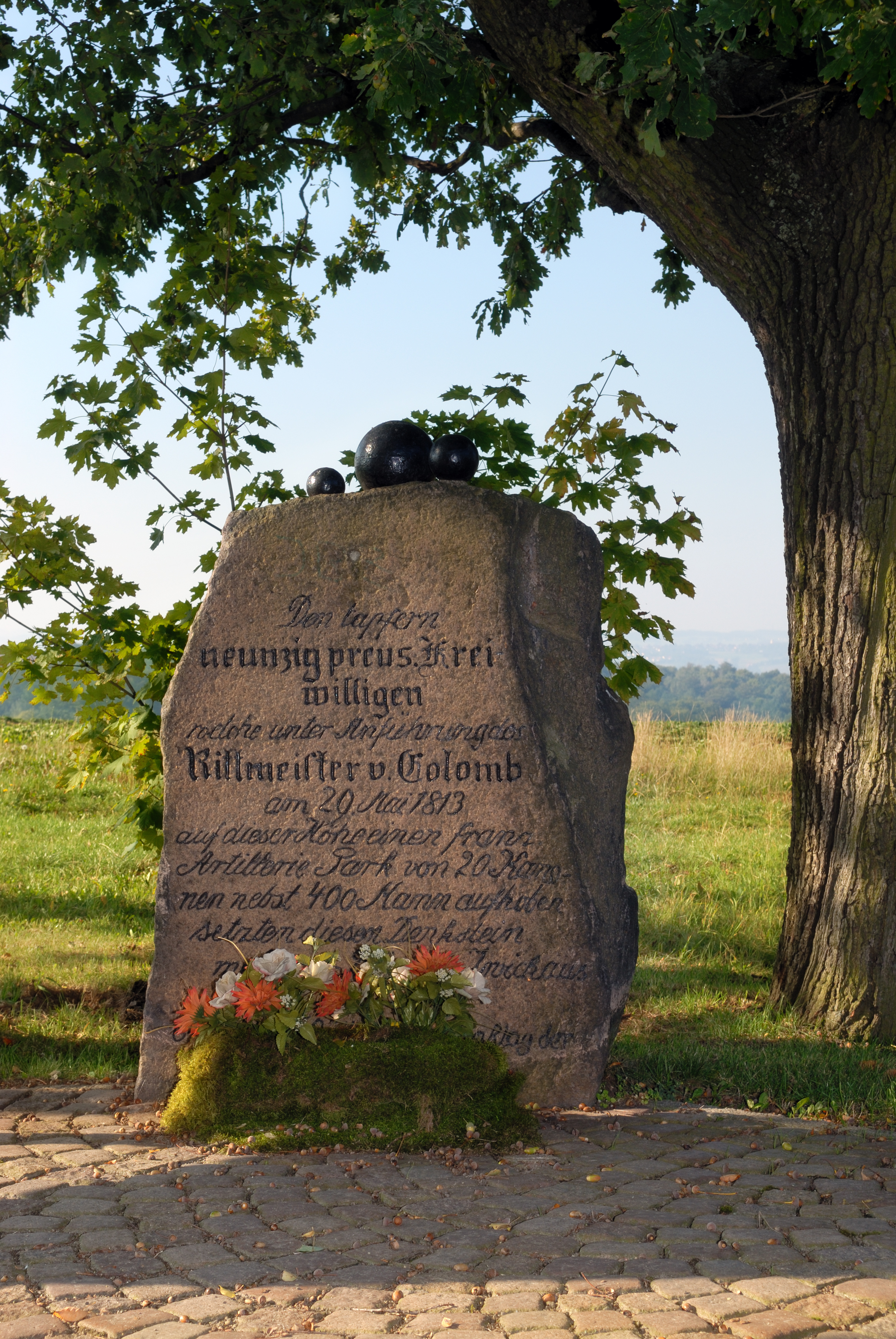
Colomb-stone near Zwickau

Colomb joined the Zieten Hussars in Berlin in 1792 and became a second lieutenant of the King's own Hussarregiment von Rudorff in 1797. He took part in the Napoleonic Wars of 1806 under the command of Blücher in Thuringia and the defense of Lübeck. Colomb was promoted to the rank of Rittmeister in 1811 and fought against French troops in 1813/14. On 20 May 1813, he commanded a unit of 90 volunteers, who managed to conquer 20 French cannons and take 400 prisoners near Zwickau. A memorial still stands today to commemorate this event.

In 1815 he became a Lieutenant Colonel and the commanding officer of the 8th Hussar Regiment and was promoted to a Colonel in 1818. On 20 October 1823, he joined the Prussian War Département and became the commander of the 12th Cavalry-Brigade in Neiße, now a Majorgeneral. In 1838, Colomb became the military commander of Cologne; 1839, Lieutenant General; and in 1841, military commander of Berlin and head of the Prussian Gendarmerie. In 1843 he became the commanding general of the V Army Corps in Posen.

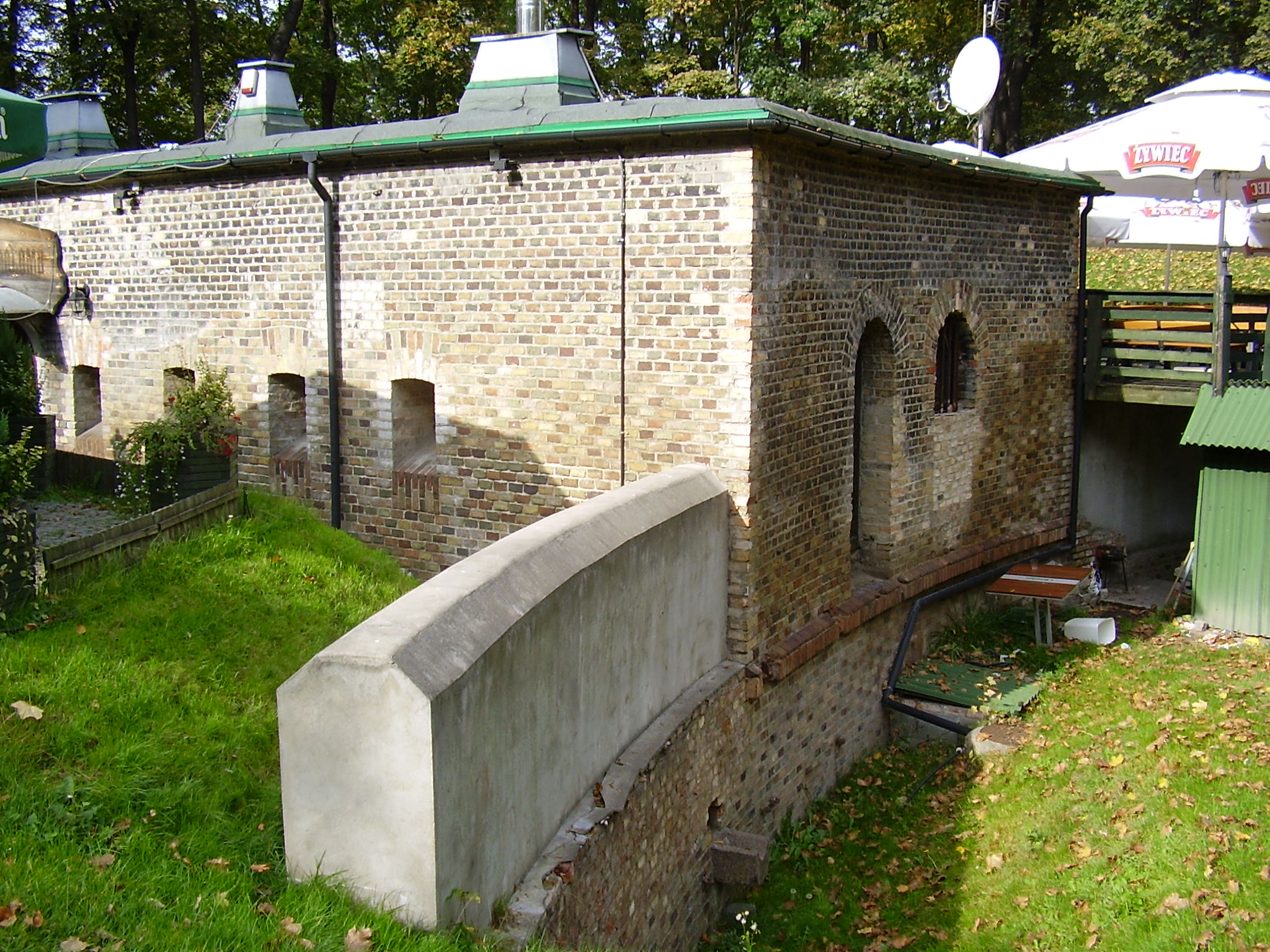
Fort Colomb, part of the Prussian Fortification of Posen

Colomb commanded the Prussian forces throughout the Greater Poland Uprising (1848) and was retired on 7 July 1849 with the promotion to General der Kavallerie. The "Bastion Colomb", a part of the Fortification of Posen was named after him. He died on 12 November 1854 in Königsberg, where he had lived after his retirement.

Colomb married Wilhelmine Luise Stosch (1784–1822) in 1808 and Maria Henriette Stosch (1791–1857) in 1824. He had 4 sons (later Prussian generals Enno and Otto Gebhard von Colomb) and a daughter with Wilhelmine, and two sons with Maria (later Prussian general Karl Ernst Georg von Colomb).
