= Plewiska =

- Village
- Location within Poland
- Coordinates: 52°21′59″N 16°48′32″E
- Country: Poland
- Voivodeship: Greater Poland
- County: Poznań
- Gmina: Komorniki
- Population (2009): 5,867

Plewiska [plɛˈviska] is a village in the administrative district of Gmina Komorniki, within Poznań County, Greater Poland Voivodeship, in west-central Poland.

There is a major electrical substation at Plewiska.

== Culture ==
- Komorniki Festival of Organ and Chamber Music
- Chopin: Desire for Love
