= Jarosławiec, Poznań County =

Jarosławiec
- Settlement
- Location within Poland
- Coordinates: 52°17′03″N 16°48′11″E
- Country: Poland
- Voivodeship: Greater Poland
- County: Poznań
- Gmina: Komorniki

Jarosławiec [jarɔˈswavjɛt͡s] is a settlement in the administrative district of Gmina Komorniki, within Poznań County, Greater Poland Voivodeship, in west-central Poland.
