= St. Mary Magdalene Secondary School in Poznań =

Saint Mary Magdalene High School
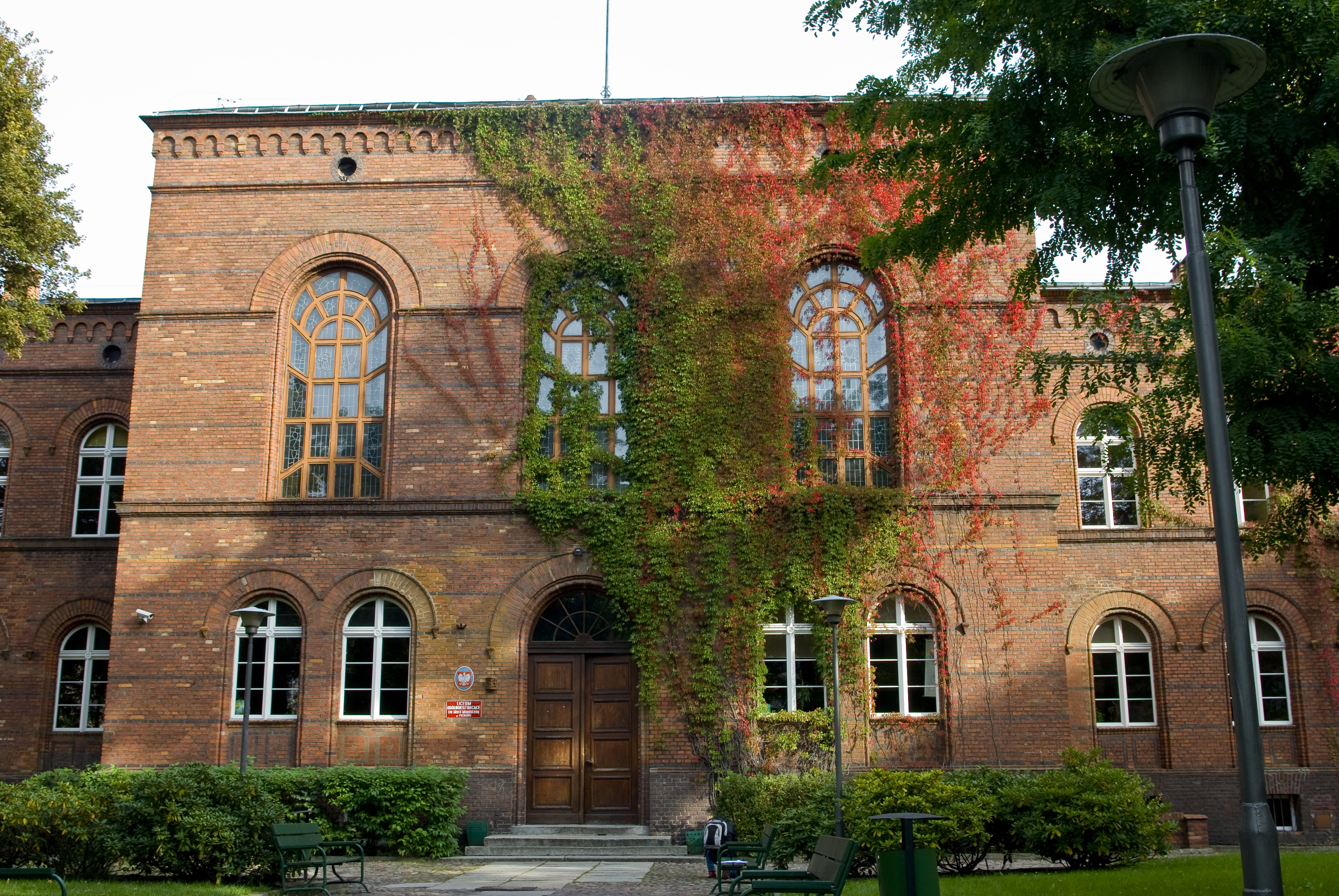
- The entrance to Saint Mary's viewed from the side of the Bernardines' Square (2012)

Location
- 24 Garbary, Old Town; Poznań, Greater Poland Province, 61-867; Poland
- Coordinates: 52°24′12″N 16°56′19″E

Information
- Other names: Latin: Ad sanctam Mariam Magdalenam
- Type: public, selective, secondary, university-preparatory
- Motto: Latin: Salus Rei Publicae suprema lex (The welfare of the Republic shall be the supreme law)
- Patron saints: Mary Magdalene formerly Thomas Aquinas
- Established: 1573; 453 years ago
- School board: Capital City of Poznań Department of Education
- Principal: Jerzy Sokół
- Key people: Hipolit Cegielski · Karol Libelt · Karol Marcinkowski
- Nickname: Marynka
- Former pupils: Marynkarze
- Website: marynka.edu.pl

Saint Mary Magdalene High School in Poznań (Polish: Liceum Ogólnokształcące św. Marii Magdaleny; Latin: Ad sanctam Mariam Magdalenam; colloquially simply as Marynka) is one of the oldest and one of the most prestigious and selective high schools in Poland. School is noted for its alumni, its academics, and the large number of graduates attending prestigious universities. Marynka has educated statesmen, scholars and generations of the intelligentsia and has been referred to as "the chief nurse of Poland's elites".

== Overview ==
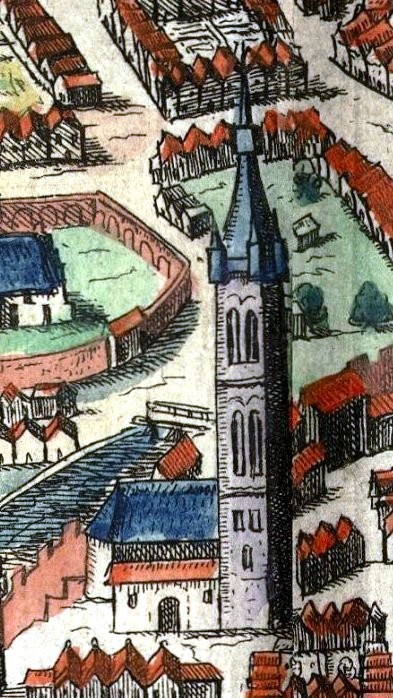
A view of Poznań's collegiate church around 1617, a piece of an engraving from book IV of Civitates Orbis Terrarum published in 1618 in Cologne by Frans Hogenberg and Georg Braun.

=== History ===
==== Early years ====
The school's founding date is disputed. The school itself dates its origins back to 1303 when it was established in the then-existing St. Mary Magdalene's Collegiate Church, with authorization from Bishop of Poznań, Andrzej Zaremba in 1302. St. Thomas Aquinas, who was the patron of all elementary education in the Middle Ages, was presumably the patron of this institution.

During the Renaissance, the school had a notorious reputation. This was purported due to lectures given there by Protestant leaders, notably rector Gregory Paul of Brzeziny, which resulted in religious conflicts.

After the Society of Jesus (Jesuits) arrived in Poznań, they created the Jesuit College, which took over the church, school, and numerous other institutions. The school opened on 25 June 1573; this date was cited as the school's official founding date on the Polish Association of the Oldest Schools' website.

==== 20th century onwards ====
In 1939, in recognition of its importance and to thank the school for educating many generations of best scientists, artists and politicians in its 600 years of history, the school was awarded the Knight's Cross of the Order of Polonia Restituta by the last free Poland's President Ignacy Mościcki.

The Society of Alumni of St. Mary Magdalene Gymnasium (now the St. Mary Magdalene Gymnasium and High School Alumni Association) has advocated for the school's reopening since 1958.

The school was renovated using private funds. On September 1, 1990, the school reopened as St. Mary Magdalene High School. In line with medieval traditions of collegiate schools, the school founded the Fraternity of St. Thomas Aquinas, which was composed entirely of pupils. Its purpose was to encourage self-improvement and engage in discussion about education and modernity.

The school received the Medal for Distinguished Service to the City of Poznań and the Decoration of Honour "Meritorious for the Greater Poland Voivodship" in 2003. In 2009, the school was presented with the Statuette of Hipolit Cegielski to recognise its commitment to high-quality cultural upbringing and as a homage to its founders and educators.

=== Building ===
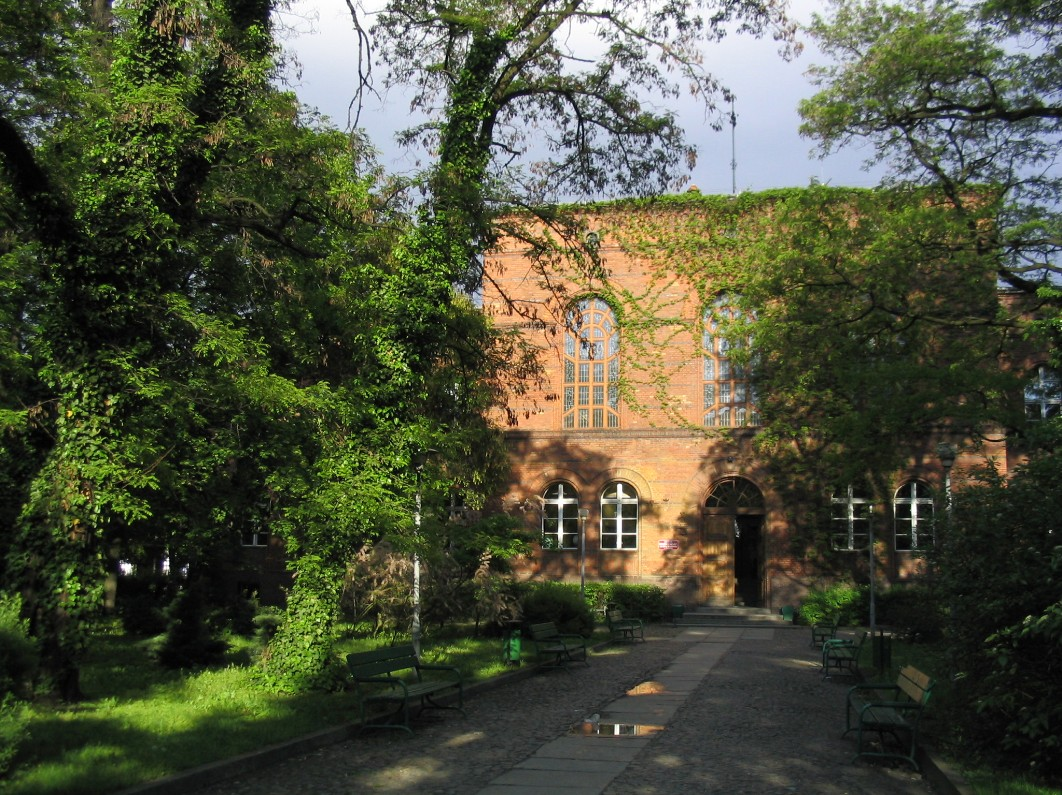
Since 1853, the school has been accommodated in this building.

The schools central administrative building (built in 1853) is located on the East side of Bernardines' Square at the Southern end of the Garbary street in Poznań's Old Town.

=== Academics ===
As of 2021, classes are offered at the school under the academic patronage of the Polish Academy of Sciences (Institute of Molecular Physics), Adam Mickiewicz University (Faculty of Polish and Classical Philology, Faculty of Modern Languages and Literatures, Faculty of Physics, Faculty of Mathematics and Computer Science, Faculty of Biology), Poznań University of Economics and Business, and Poznań University of Medical Sciences.

All students are required to study two foreign languages. In addition to compulsory English, they choose German, French or Spanish. In the Polish educational system, general education liceum's (Polish: Liceum ogólnokształcące) class profiles relate to the institution's unique categories of topics of study. Marynka offers class profiles in Humanities (advanced Polish, English, and History), Exact and Natural Sciences (advanced Mathematics, Biology, and Chemistry), Natural Sciences (advanced Biology and Chemistry), Exact Sciences (advanced Mathematics, Biology, and Chemistry), and Mathematics and Computer Science (advanced Mathematics, Information Technology and English).

=== Reputation ===
The school has continuously been ranked among the top three high schools in the Capital City of Poznań out of its thirty-four active high schools and one of the most selective schools in the country.

== Notable alumni ==
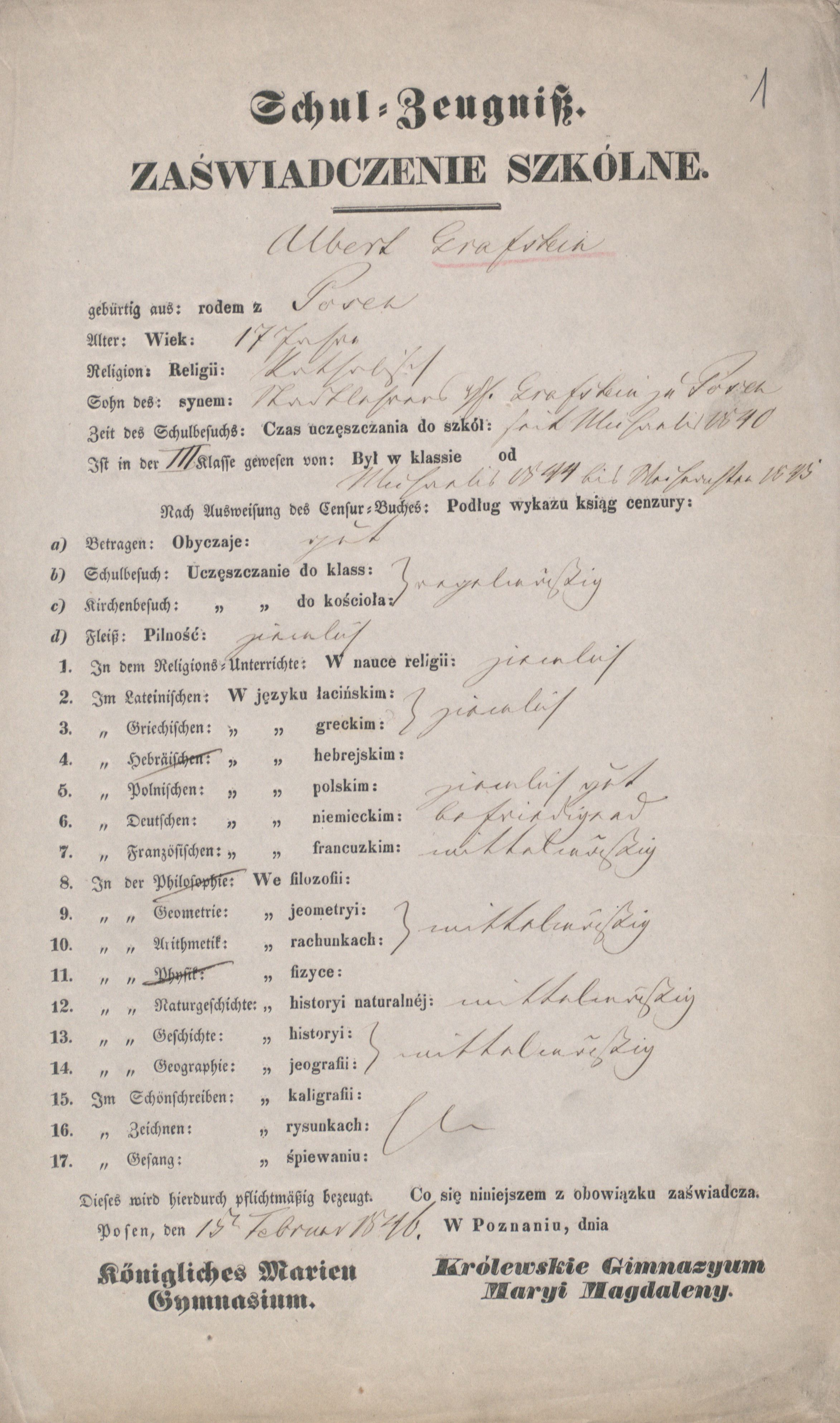
Gymnasium's diploma (1846)

Among its alumni the school counts writers (Jan Kasprowicz, Józef Kościelski) Enigma codebreaker Henryk Zygalski, clergy (Primate of Poland Leon Przyłuski, Nobel Peace Prize Nominee Father Marian Żelazek), six rectors of research universities (including Kazimierz Morawski, rector of Jagiellonian University and candidate for the office of President of Poland in 1922), renowned legal scholars (Prof. Michał Sczaniecki, Prof. Witalis Ludwiczak), physicians (Prof. Wiktor Dega, Dr. Karol Marcinkowski) and politicians.

=== Faculty School ===
- Leon Michał Przyłuski (1789–1865), Roman Catholic Bishop and Archbishop of Gniezno and Primate of Poland in the years 1845–1865, who was active in the Polish independence movement of the late 1800s.
- Ignacy Prądzyński (1792–1850), military commander and a general of the Polish Army. A veteran of the Napoleonic Wars, he was one of the most successful Polish commanders of the November Uprising against Russia.
- Sir Paweł Strzelecki KCB CMG FRGS MRS (1797–1873), explorer and geologist who in 1845 also became a British subject.
- Karol Marcinkowski (1800–1846), physician, social activist in the Grand Duchy of Poznań.

=== St. Mary Magdalene Gymnasium ===
- Felicjan Sypniewski (1822–1877), naturalist, botanist, entomologist, malacologist, algologist and philosopher. His ground-breaking studies and scientific publications influenced the next generations of Polish naturalists and have laid down foundations of malacology.
- Karol Libelt (1807–1875), philosopher, writer, political and social activist, social worker and liberal, nationalist politician, president of the Poznań Society of Friends of Learning.
- Teodor Teofil Matecki (1810–1886), physician, social activist and member of Poznań Society of Friends of Learning.
- Hipolit Cegielski (1813–1868), businessman and social and cultural activist.
- Władysław Niegolewski (1819–1885), liberal politician and member of parliament, insurgent in Greater Poland Uprising 1846, Greater Poland Uprising 1848 and January Uprising 1863, cofounder of Central Economic Society (TCL) in 1861 and People's Libraries Society (CTG) in 1880.
- Edmund Taczanowski (1822–1879), general, insurrectionist, member of the Taczanowski magnate dynasty, and Lord of the estate of Choryń in the province of Poznań.
- Teofil Magdziński (1818-1889), lawyer, activist and politician.
- Edward Likowski (1836–1915), Archbishop of Poznań and Gniezno and primate of the Catholic Church in Poland.
- Florian Stablewski (1841–1906), priest and politician, archbishop of Poznań and Gniezno, and member of the Prussian parliament.
- Józef Kościelski (1845–1911), poet, politician and parliamentarian, co-founder of the Straż (Guard) society.
- Kazimierz Morawski (1852–1925), classical philologist, historian, translator, professor and rector of Jagiellonian University, president of Polish Academy of Learning, candidate for the President of Poland, Knight of the Order of the White Eagle.
- Jan Kasprowicz (1860–1926), poet, playwright, critic and translator; a foremost representative of Young Poland.
- Bogdan Raczkowski (1888–1939), influential engineer, builder and urbanist in Bydgoszcz, from the 1920s till the outbreak of World War II.
- Wojciech Trąmpczyński (1860–1953), lawyer and National Democratic politician. Voivode of the Poznań Voivodeship in 1919. He served as marshal of the Sejm of Poland from 1919 to 1922 and Senate of Poland from 1922 to 1928.
- Bernard Chrzanowski (1861–1944), social and political activist, president of the Union of the Greater Poland Falcons.
- Cyryl Ratajski (1875–1942), politician and lawyer.
- Kazimierz Cwojdziński (1878–1948), mathematician, professor of the School of Engineering in Poznań.
- Wiktor Dega (1896–1995), surgeon. He was an orthopedist who was well known for his work on polio. He served as an expert for the World Health Organization. He created new apparatus and devices to help accident victims and survivors of polio, as well as new therapies and operations for congenital dislocations of the hip.
- Henryk Zygalski (1908–1978), mathematician and cryptologist who worked at breaking German Enigma ciphers before and during World War II.
- Witalis Ludwiczak (1910–1988), ice hockey player who competed in the 1932 Winter Olympics and in the 1936 Winter Olympics.
- Jerzy Waldorff-Preyss of the Nabram coat of arms (1910–1999), Polish baron, attorney, a TV personality, writer, publicist, literary critic and music aficionado.
- Adam Cardinal Kozłowiecki, S.J. (1911–2007), was Archbishop of the Archdiocese of Lusaka in Zambia.
