= Karol Marcinkowski 1st Secondary School in Poznań =

High school in Poznań, Poland

- I Liceum Ogólnokształcące im. Karola Marcinkowskiego
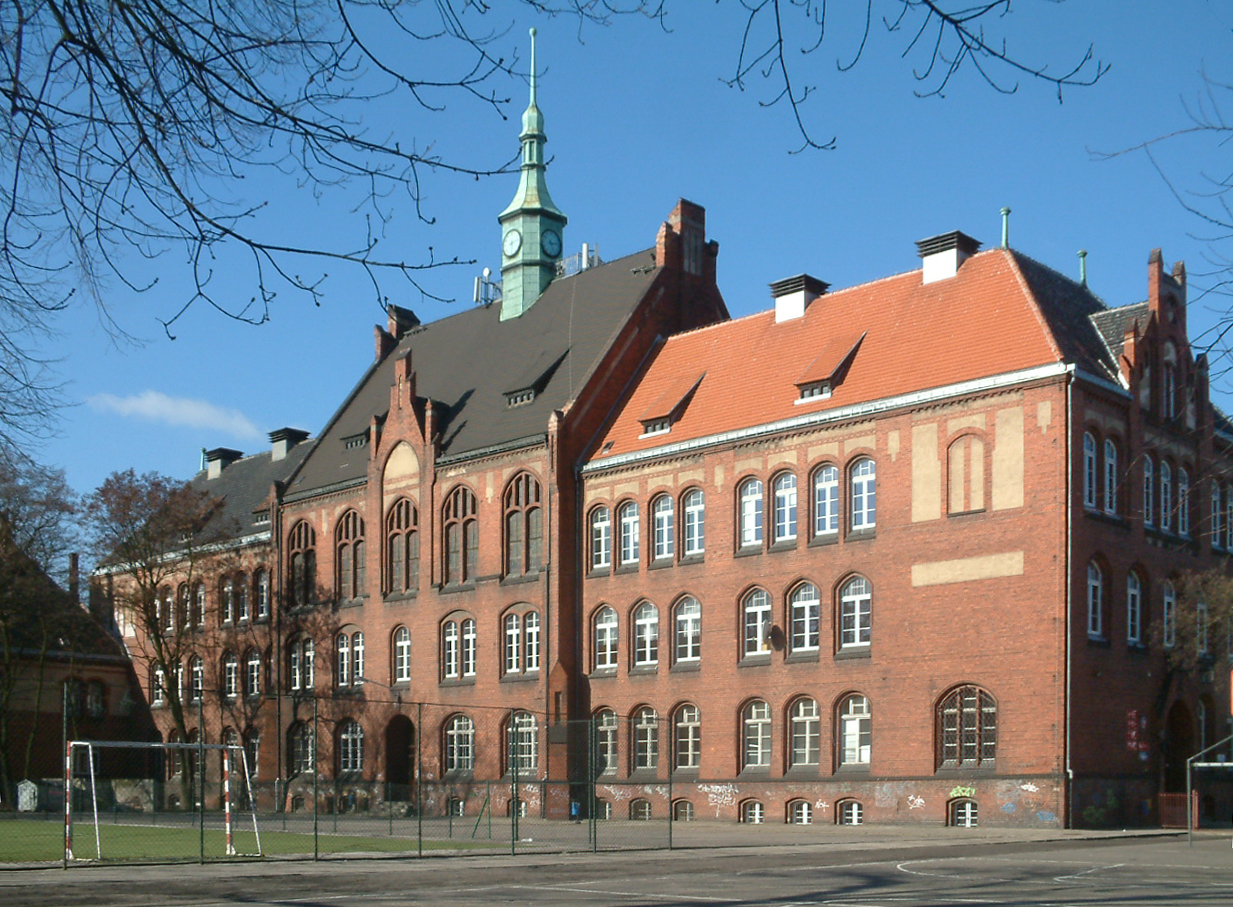
- Building of Marcinek

Location
- 16 Bukowska Street; Poznań; Poland; 52°24′25″N 16°54′13″E

Information
- Type: high school
- Patron saints: Karol Marcinkowski (since 1919); Augusta Victoria (1903–1919)
- Established: 1903/1919
- Principal: ai. Hanna Sobczyńska

The Karol Marcinkowski High School, along with the Karol Marcinkowski Adult High School, and from 2001 to 2019 also the Karol Marcinkowski Bilingual Gymnasium, forming part of the No. 1 General Education School Complex, is the oldest public high school in Poznań, also known as Marcinek.

It occupies a neo-Gothic building at 16 Bukowska Street, erected between 1901 and 1903 for the German Royal Gymnasium named after Augusta Victoria, whose establishment was aimed at the Germanization of Greater Poland. After Poland regained independence, on 1 May 1919, it was renamed the Polish State Gymnasium named after Karol Marcinkowski. During World War II, the building housed military hospitals, successively: German and Soviet. For this reason, the school regained its building only at the end of 1945, although classes resumed in other buildings before the city was liberated. In the 1960s, the school was associated with UNESCO, and expanded French language teaching began, since 1991 conducted by the bilingual section.

Since the beginning of the Polish institution's existence, the scout troop Błękitna Czternastka has been operating alongside it, and since 1989, the Alumni Association of the Karol Marcinkowski Gymnasium and High School has also been functioning as an auxiliary organization. Over the years, the school has published numerous magazines and is also the organizer of a nationwide theater festival and local TED conferences.

== History ==
=== From 1919 ===
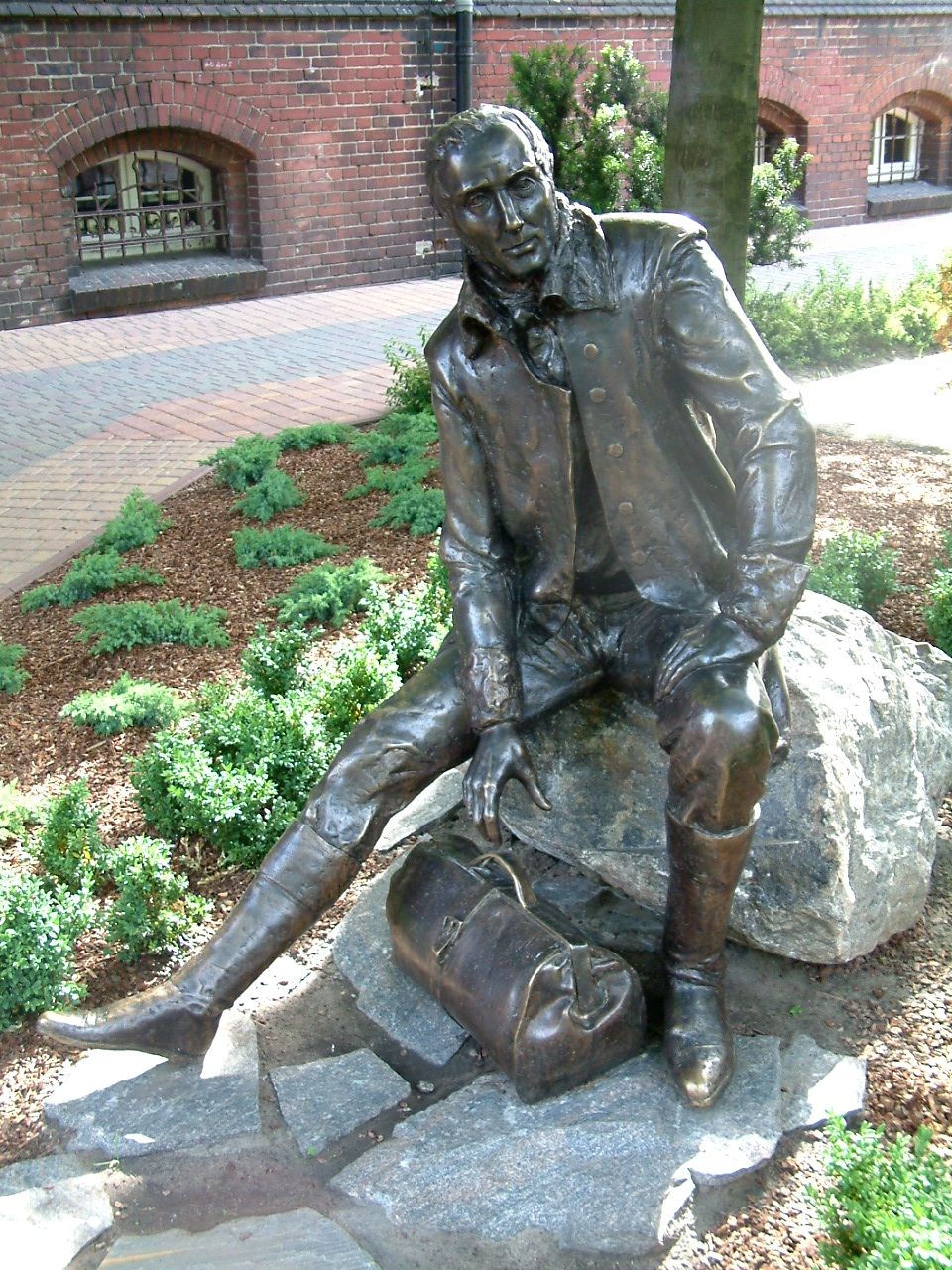
Monument to Karol Marcinkowski in front of the school entrance

In 1899, Johann Frydrychowicz, the last chairman of the Jeżyce council, who lacked the support of his colleagues, leased a plot of land located at the intersection of Bukerstrasse (now Bukowska) and Cesarzowa Wiktoria (now Grunwaldzka) streets. This plot was part of an inn of the nearby Villa Flora. He did so without the consent of the previous owner, Bolesław Szermer, who thereby lost an estate worth about 5,000 marks. The new owner, the penny-farthing merchant Max Lohmeyer, developed the area into a training ground for riding the vehicles. In winter, it was converted into an ice rink. After the annexation of Jeżyce to Poznań in 1900, the Prussian authorities decided to build a German state gymnasium at this location, intending to increase the number of secondary schools in the city (at the end of the 19th century, there were eight, including three boys' gymnasiums: the Catholic St. Mary Magdalene, the Evangelical Friedrich Wilhelm, and the Real Gotthilf Berger). It became a significant center for the Germanization of Greater Poland.

Construction of the building began in August 1901 according to the design by the German architect Fuchs from the Ministry of Public Works, who also supervised the construction work. The construction was completed in April 1903, and the ceremonial consecration of the building took place on 16 April 1903. Until Poland regained independence, it housed the eight-year gymnasium Königliches Auguste-Victoria Gymnasium (Augusta Victoria Royal Gymnasium). The first students were boys transferred from the Gotthilf Berger Gymnasium on Strzelecka Street. From there, part of the teaching staff and the first director Moritz Friebe, who served from 1903 to 1911, came to Marcinek. He was succeeded by Paul Schultze, who served in his position until 30 March 1919. The language of instruction was German, and most of the students were of German nationality. Polish and Jewish students formed a minority in the school. Forty-nine Polish high school students, initiated by those transferred from Berger Gymnasium, operated in the underground Tomasz Zan Society during the partitions, where they learned Polish history, the Polish language, drill, and weapon handling. The number of students in the first year of the German institution's operation (1903/1904) was 489 (including 237 transferred from Berger Gymnasium), while in the last year (1918/1919) it was 569.

=== 1919–1945 ===
On 1 April 1919, the Commissariat of the Supreme People's Council appointed Antoni Borzucki as the first director of the State Gymnasium named after Karol Marcinkowski. A month later, on 1 May, the first school year was inaugurated. This date, along with the symbolic act of Polish students breaking the black Prussian eagle located above the side entrance to the building facing the playground, is considered the official start of the Polish institution's operations. Similar to its predecessor, it remained an eight-year boys' school. At that time, 358 Polish and 299 German students began their education. The German minority was divided into eight homogeneous and three mixed classes. Out of the 31 German teachers from the partition period, only seven remained, so initially, some classes were still taught in German. Some of the first Polish professors were brought by Polish educational authorities from the Galicia region. The solemn inauguration of the 1919/1920 school year took place on 1 September 1919 in the school auditorium. At that time, 677 people resumed their education (thus ranking second after the Maria Magdalena Gymnasium, which became the leading position from 1928). The first graduated ins took place in December 1919. Only three students took the Polish exam at that time, and in the following year, four. German students and teachers finally left the school at the beginning of the 1920/1921 school year. It was also then that the number of candidates taking the Polish-language exam increased sharply.

Due to the large number of students, in October 1920, it became necessary to relocate 6 classes to a separate building on Matejki Street. After their subsequent moves to a tenement house on Wyspiańskiego Street in September 1921, the Ignacy Paderewski Gymnasium was established there as an independent institution. For those who participated in the Polish–Soviet War in 1920, the school organized a separate course of study from 1920 to 1923. For this reason (despite the separation of 6 classes), in the 1921/1922 school year, Marcinek had 706 students.

During the interwar period, Marcinek, alongside the Saint Mary Magdalene High School, was one of the best high schools in Poznań. Admission to the school for graduates of four-year primary schools was based on an entrance exam. The number of candidates at that time ranged from 3 to 5 per place. Each year, about 450 students attended the school, taught by an average of 30–40 teachers. Most of the teachers were men (the school employed only two female teachers throughout the interwar period), often working simultaneously at the University of Poznań. At that time, there were two class profiles: classical and humanistic. Emphasis was placed on the study of the Polish language and other foreign languages (including Greek and Latin). The weekly workload, with six days of schooling, did not exceed thirty hours. Most of the student community at that time came from the working intelligentsia. In 1928, the tuition fee was 110 złoty per semester, and three years later, it increased by 40 złoty. In case of financial difficulties or good academic performance, some students were exempted from paying fees.

Since 1919, the school has had a scout troop called Błękitna Czternastka. On 7 December 1923, the Association of Friends of the Gymnasium named after Karol Marcinkowski was founded, bringing together alumni and their families to provide financial support to students and equip classrooms. In 1921, a medical office (run by Jan Adamski for a long time) was established, and eight years later, a dental clinic. In the early years of the Polish school's operation, optional school uniforms were introduced in the form of a brown rogatywka with a purple trim and a silver (for the gymnasium) or gold (for the high school) cord. In the mid-1930s, mandatory, standardized uniforms were introduced. For the four-year gymnasium, it was a navy blue outfit with blue trim and a shield with the number 780 on a blue background, along with a navy blue cap with a blue trim. In the case of high school students, the blue color was replaced with burgundy.

In 1938, the last eight-year cycle high school graduated in took place. In the following year, the final exams were already held in a six-year cycle (four-year gymnasium and two-year high school, culminating in small and large exams, respectively). In the 1937/1938 school year, there were 480 students attending the school. The outbreak of World War II caused a break in its operations. As a result of wartime activities and repression by the occupiers, 14 pre-war teachers and 119 students (including 10 graduates of the German gymnasium) perished. During the war, the building premises initially served as German military barracks, then as a military hospital, and from February 1945 as a Red Army hospital.

=== After 1945 ===
The functioning of the institution under the pre-war organizational system as the Gymnasium and High School named after Karol Marcinkowski was resumed on 15 February 1945, still during the battle for the city. It was the first school in Poznań to resume its activities after World War II. At that time, the pre-war Polish language teacher (working at Marcinek and the Gymnasium of St. Mary Magdalene) Czesław Latawiec was appointed as the first principal. He held this position until his transfer as the superintendent on 30 April 1945. Information about the resumption of classes was posted on handwritten cards distributed in the city by participants of secret gatherings during the war. Within the first few days, about 700 candidates applied, of which 509 were ultimately admitted. Initially, due to the operation of a Soviet hospital in the building on Bukowska Street, classes were held in buildings successively located on Jarochowskiego, Matejki, Mylna, and Różana streets.

The ceremonial opening of the school year, inaugurated with a mass at the Church of Our Lady of Sorrows on Głogowska Street, took place on Thursday, 1 March 1945. Due to the lack of an assembly hall in the building on Jarochowskiego Street, it was held in the gymnasium near Wilson Park. Each relocation involved students moving school equipment, which had been stored by two caretakers in wooden sheds on the school premises during the war. Lessons on Matejki Street took place from 6:30 AM to 11:00 AM, so that afterwards, the second-grade girls of the II High School could enter. Even before moving to Różana Street, students organized a march under the windows of the then seat of the Curatorium with a banner reading Wandering Gymnasium and High School No. 1 in Poznań. The school regained its own building only in December 1945. However, it required cleaning and replacing windows broken during the war. Classes were finally resumed after the winter break. The final relocation was led by Feliks Załachowski, the pre-war principal of the institution, who spent the last years of the war in a concentration camp, returning to his position in September 1945.

Initially, to make up for the lost time during the war, education for "delayed" years was conducted in an accelerated mode: the material of a two-year high school was covered in one year. At that time, even 25-year-olds attended school. The first post-war graduated in exams took place from 4 to 9 April 1945, followed by subsequent exams in July 1945 and January and June 1946. In the post-war Marcinek, there were three class profiles: humanistic, mathematical-physical, and mathematical-biological. In the 1945/1946 school year, 610 people attended the school. Since then, the majority of the student community consisted of youth from intelligentsia families. In the post-war years, little emphasis was placed on students' attire. The mandatory uniform was unsuccessfully attempted to be reintroduced at the end of the 1950s. On 30 October 1945, the Błękitna Czternastka Scout Troop was reactivated, and on 7 November 1946, on the hundredth anniversary of Karol Marcinkowski's death, a new school banner was funded. After the dissolution of the Polish Scouting and Guiding Association in 1949, the troop was reactivated only in January 1957. In 1967, the tradition of annual hikes to Dąbrówka Ludomska, the place of the patron's death, began, taking place on the last Saturday of September. Since 1969, their organization has been managed by the Błękitna Czternastka.

In 1948, teaching began in the four-year comprehensive high school system (following a seven-year primary school). It was also then that it adopted the name it bears to this day, the Karol Marcinkowski High School. Since 1956, it has had the status of a training school of the Adam Mickiewicz University, and since 1964, it has been part of the UNESCO Schools Association. In the 1962/1963 school year, at the initiative of the director Ludwik Graja, extended French language teaching was introduced in some classes. In the 1967/1968 school year, along with the first students after eight years of primary school, Marcinek also admitted girls for the first time, who have since constituted the majority of the student community. It was also then that the new numbering of classes I–IV (replacing the old VIII–XI) began. Due to the demographic boom of the 1960s and 1970s, the 1973/1974 school year saw a record number of students: 1,055 individuals in 28 classes.

The Student Government, active since the school's inception, initiated the hanging of crosses in classrooms in 1981. In 1991, at the initiative of the principal Marek Rybarczyk, the Polish-French bilingual section, which still exists today, was established. Education was conducted in a four-year cycle, preceded by a preparatory class with 20 French lessons per week. In 2001, the Karol Marcinkowski Bilingual Gymnasium with French language began its activity, taking over the function of the "0" class. It was also then that the General High School Complex No. 1 was established, consisting of the newly created bilingual gymnasium, comprehensive high school, and the adult high school existing since the 1940s. A year later, teaching began in a three-year high school cycle. In connection with the education reform of 2017, it was decided to return to the system from before 2001, i.e., a four-year high school preceded by a French-language introductory class. From 1919 to 2014, the school saw 12,706 graduates, including 1,266 individuals during the interwar period.

=== Jubilees ===
In 1959, celebrations marking the 40th anniversary of the school were held, combined with the 1st Alumni Reunion. These were among the first such events in Poland after World War II. Ten years later, from 19 to 20 April 1969, the 2nd Reunion was again combined with the 50th anniversary of the school and the 25th anniversary of the Polish People's Republic. Over 1,000 people participated in these events. Due to the school's association with UNESCO, a solemn ceremony took place in the auditorium on 28 October 1970 to commemorate the 25th anniversary of the United Nations. In 1979, a new banner was donated to the school to celebrate its 60th anniversary. The celebrations of the 70th anniversary were combined with the 3rd Alumni Reunion, which was the largest so far with over 3,000 participants. These were the first celebrations organized by the Alumni Association. Since then, they have been held regularly every five years at the initiative of the association. Since 1995, the association has also been organizing annual meetings on the second Saturday of May to commemorate the full five-year anniversaries of graduated in exams. The 80th anniversary celebrations from 15 to 16 May 1999 were honored with a concert by the band Elektryczne Gitary on the school field. On the other hand, the celebrations of the 90th anniversary from 15 to 16 May 2009 were concluded with a four-hour concert by the band Dżem. The 85th anniversary celebrations took place from 14 to 15 May 2004, and the 95th anniversary on 10 May 2014. The centenary celebrations were planned for 17 and 18 May 2019.

== Architecture ==
A video showing the high school building and its interior (May 2014)

The school complex occupies a plot of land measuring 1,200 m^{2} in the triangle formed by Bukowska, Grunwaldzka, and Szylinga streets, adjacent to the Poznań Old Zoo. The main two-story neo-Gothic building, made of red brick, has two lower annexes at the side elevations. Initially, one of these annexes (southern) served as the principal's residence, while the other (northern) was designated for the caretaker's house. The interior layout is semi-bay, with classrooms located on the side facing the soccer field. The hall on the ground floor, covered with neo-Gothic lierne vault, is flanked by two spacious staircases leading to the auditorium. The original restrooms were located in a separate, longitudinal building on the west side of the main building, connected to it by two arcaded skyways. In later years, a sewage pipe was added to the main building. In the northeast corner of the plot, a separate building housing the gymnasium was located, with a botanical garden attached to it from the south. The central part of the plot was occupied by a gravel soccer field. The area south of the school building and the one adjacent to the main entrance were landscaped into small green spaces.

The central, elevated part of the second floor, crowned with a tower with a clock and a platform for astronomical observations, houses the auditorium with an area of 326 m^{2}, covered by an ornate wooden hanging ceiling. Originally equipped with a small altar and an organ loft, which were used for religious services before school ceremonies. In 1929, a stage was added to the auditorium, where performances were presented as part of the Universal National Exhibition in the same year. After 1945, it was relocated under the southern wall of the room, thus obstructing one of the entrances.

In the 1960s, new classroom pavilions were erected on the small soccer field. Due to the increase in the number of students, a major renovation of the building was carried out between 1974 and 1978. The number of subject classrooms was increased, a central locker room and library were organized, and the installations of central heating, water, sewage, and electricity were replaced. Additionally, the teachers' room, secretariat, and management offices were relocated to the southern annex of the main building. In 1988, the first computer lab was established at the school, followed by another one in 2003.

In 2002, the main entrance doors to the building were reconstructed, faithfully copying the original doors. In 2004, the roof of the main building was renovated, and the clock on the tower began operating again. In 2007, an illuminated aluminum sign with the inscription Gimnazjum i Liceum im. Karola Marcinkowskiego (Karol Marcinkowski Gymnasium and High School) was placed on the north-facing main facade of the building, at a height of about 8 meters from Bukowska Street. The stained glass windows in the school auditorium were also renovated at that time. Between 2009 and 2011, a renovation of the gymnasium building was carried out, restoring its original architectural character and refurbishing the interiors. In September 2013, a thorough renovation of the auditorium was conducted, including the replacement of the parquet floor, installation of wainscoting, and repainting of the walls.

=== Memorials ===
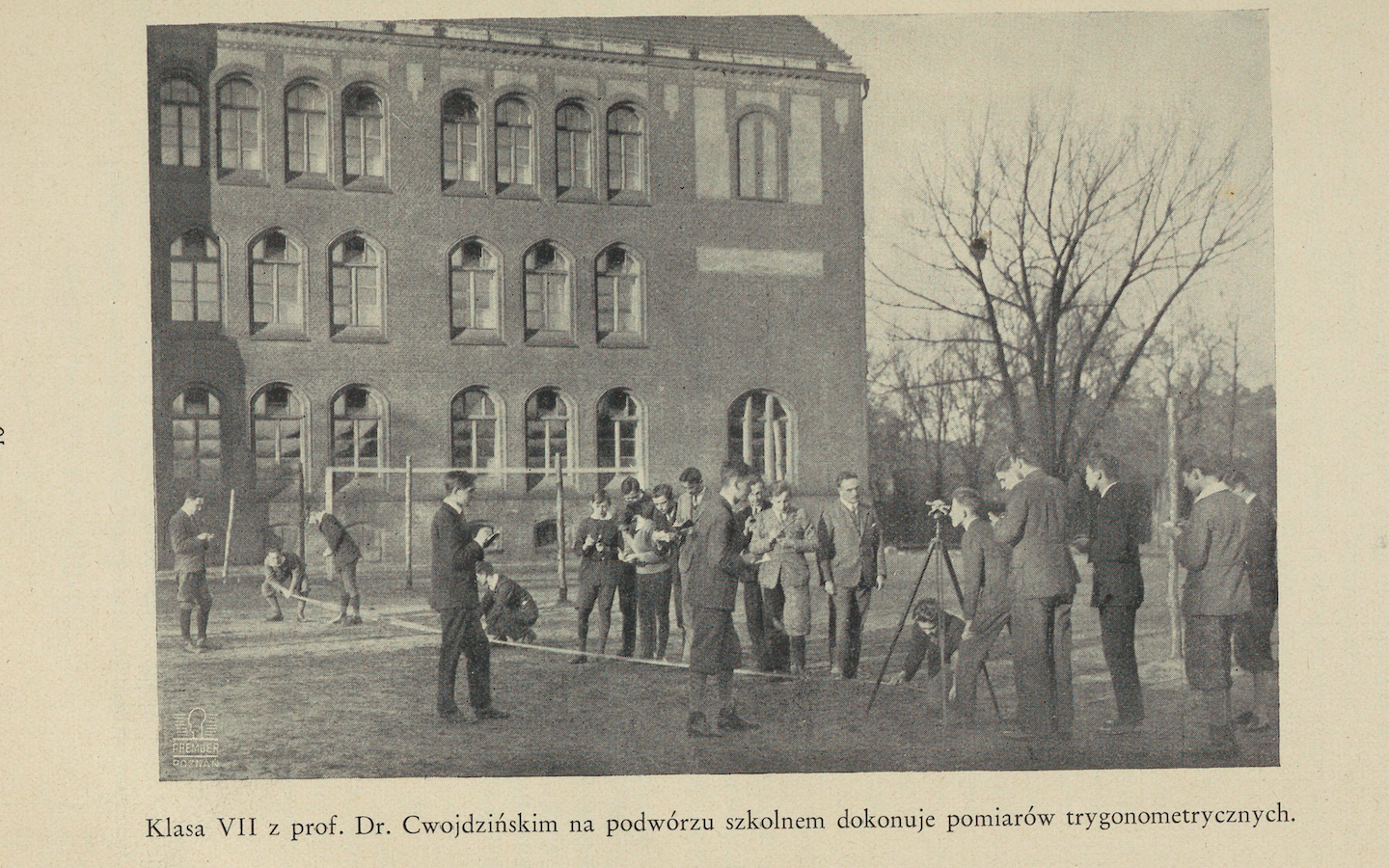
School soccer field and apprenticeship students circa 1929

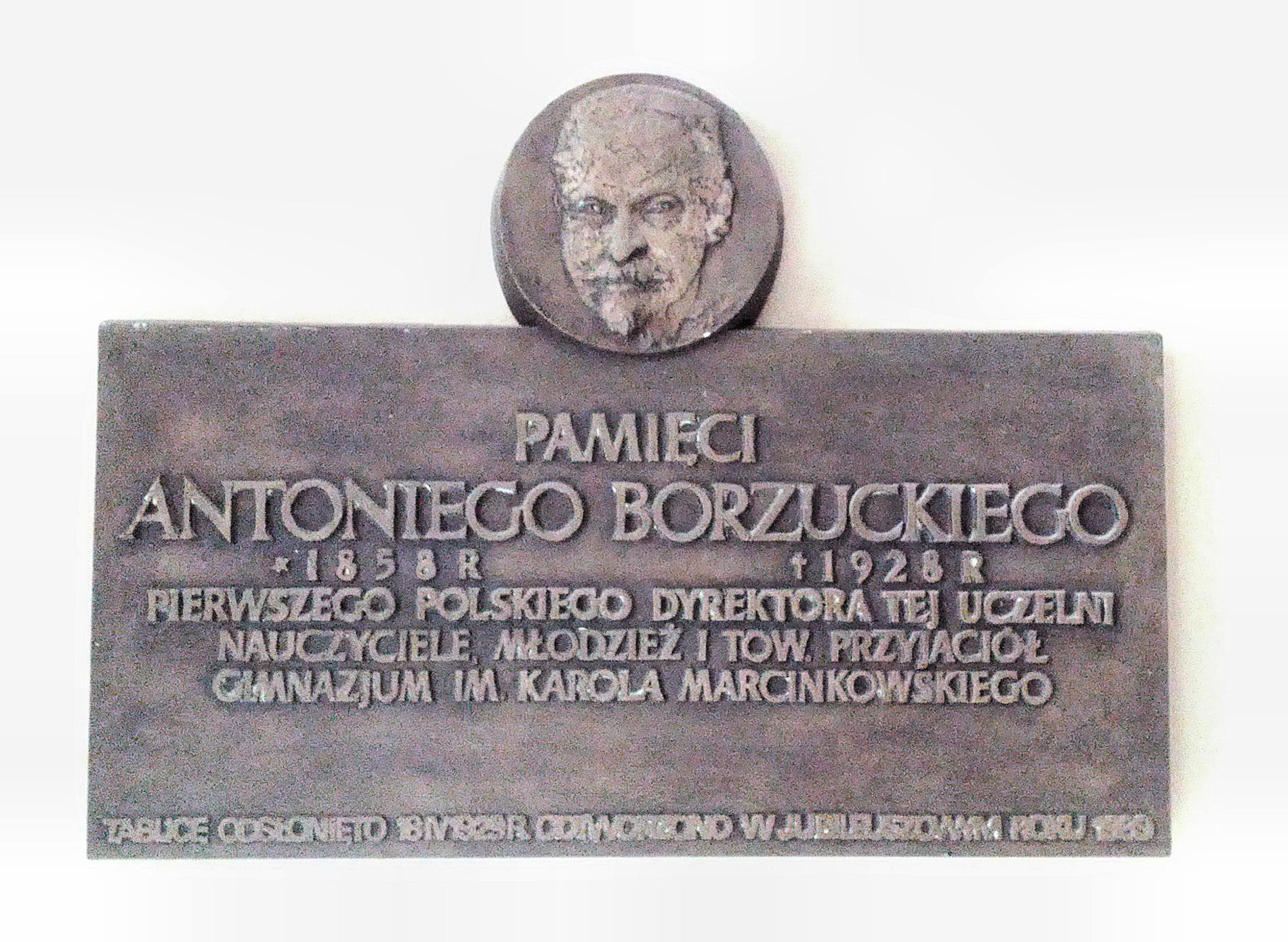
Reconstructed in 1989, the plaque commemorates the school's first principal

On 26 March 1925, a bust of the patron, created by the art teacher Aleksander Korpal, was solemnly unveiled in the building. On 18 April 1929, a commemorative plaque by the same author was unveiled, dedicated to the late first school principal, Antoni Borzucki, who died the previous year. It was dismantled and destroyed by the Germans during World War II. As part of the school's 50th anniversary celebrations in 1969, a plaque by Irena Rosińska was unveiled in the main hall, commemorating the teachers and students who died and were murdered between 1939 and 1945. On the occasion of the 70th anniversary, the reconstructed memorial plaque in honor of Antoni Borzucki was also unveiled there.

On 14 May 2005, one of the two Poznań monuments to Karol Marcinkowski, designed by Wiesław Koronowski, was unveiled in front of the main entrance. On 10 May 2008, as part of the jubilee meetings of graduating classes, a boulder with a commemorative plaque by the same author was unveiled in the garden in front of the entrance, dedicated to Stefan Borsukiewicz – an alumnus of the school and a poet who died during World War II. On 11 May 2013, another commemorative boulder by Wiesław Koronowski and Jarosław Bogucki was unveiled, dedicated to Jan and Stanisław Kasznica – Marcinek graduates and soldiers who fought in World War II. The former fell during the September Campaign, while the latter was the last Commander-in-Chief of the National Armed Forces, sentenced and executed by the communist regime in 1948.

== People associated with the school ==
=== Principals ===
==== German principals ====
1. Moritz Friebe (1903–1911)
2. Paul Schultze (1911–1919)

==== Polish principals ====
{{Div col|content=* Antoni Borzucki (1919–1928)

- Andrzej Wantuch (1928–1934)
- Tadeusz Adamczyk (1934–1935)
- Władysław Skarbiński (1936–1938)
- Feliks Załachowski (1938–1939)
- Czesław Latawiec (1945)
- Brunon Czajkowski (1945)
- Feliks Załachowski (1945–1947)
- Paweł Roszko (1947–1948)
- Mieczysław Prażmowski (1949–1954)
- Mateusz Pater (1954–1955)
- Antoni Jackowski (1955–1956)
- Wacław Szyguła (1956–1959)
- Ludwik Graja (1959–1972)
- Czesław Skrzypek (1972–1981)
- Wojciech Banasiewicz (1981–1987)
- Andrzej Pietrucha (1987–1990)
- Marek Rybarczyk (1990–1991)
- Emilia Jackowska (1991–2001)
- Alina Chojnacka (2001–2021)
- Danuta Eckert (2021–) on vacation
- ai. Hanna Sobczyńska (2025–)

=== Teachers ===
==== Until 1939 ====
- Tadeusz Adamczyk (1893–1944) – propaedeutics of philosophy, principal in the years 1934–1935;
- Mieczysław Balcer (1906–1995) – gymnastics;
- Jan Berger (1889–1957) – Latin, history;
- Antoni Borzucki (1858–1928) – Latin, history, principal in the years 1919–1928;
- Oskar Callier (1846–1929) – French, mathematics;
- Kazimierz Cwojdziński (1878–1949) – mathematics;
- Leon Dołżycki (1888–1965) – arts, gymnastics;
- Włodzimierz Dworzaczek (1905–1988) – Polish, history, geography;
- Lesław Eustachiewicz (1913–1998) – Polish;
- Wolf Feilchenfeld (1827–1913) – Jewish religion (until 1913);
- Bonawentura Graszyński (1859–1922) – Greek, military training;
- Zygmunt Irżabek (1880–1939) – Polish, Latin, history, library;
- Witold Jakóbczyk (1909–1986) – history;
- Franciszek Jaśkowiak (1903–1983) – French;
- Bogumił Krygowski (1905–1977) – geography;
- Czesław Latawiec (1902–1986) – Polish (also after 1945), principal in 1945;
- Edmund Łasiński (1874–1935) – biology, mathematics;
- Józef Łęgowski (1852–1930) – history, Polish (in the years 1906–1915; the only Polish teacher of the German gymnasium);
- Antoni Małłek (1851–1917) – music;
- Gustaw Manitius (1880–1940) – evangelical religion;
- Arnold Marcinkowski (1897–1986) – religion (also after 1945);
- Piotr Miętkiewicz (1891–1957) – arts, gymnastics, German;
- Roch Morcinek (1903–1968) – history;
- Stanisław Mróz (1890–1972) – manual work;
- Władysław Pniewski (1893–1940);
- Julian Rzóska (1900–1984) – biology;
- Karol Rzyski (1885–1956) – English, French, German (also after 1945);
- Jan Stahr (1888–1951) – Latin (also after 1945);
- Wiktor Steffen (1903–1997) – Greek, Latin, German;
- Konstanty Troczyński (1906–1942) – Polish;
- Józef Widajewicz (1889–1954) – geography, history, Polish;
- Juliusz Willaume (1904–1980) – geography, history.

==== After 1945 ====
- Antoni Grochowalski (born 1939) – music;
- Jan Grzegorzewski (1914–2008) – arts;
- Wiktor Jankowski (1913–1996) – mathematics;
- Czesław Latawiec (1902–1986) – Polish (also before 1939), principal in 1945;
- Arnold Marcinkowski (1897–1986) – religion (also before 1939);
- Marcin Mortka (born 1976) – English;
- Karol Rzyski (1885–1956) – English, French (also before 1939);
- Lech Słowiński (1922–2005) – Polish;
- Jan Stahr (1888–1951) – Latin, propaedeutics of philosophy (also before 1939);
- Włodzimierz Staś (1925–2011) – mathematics, physics;
- Ferdynand Szumlas (1924–1979) – chemistry;
- Piotr Walerych (born 1958) – psychology, history;
- Wacław Wróblewski (1924–2011) – physical education.

=== Notable alumni ===
- Józef Kostrzewski (graduated in 1907) – archaeologist, museologist, professor at the Adam Mickiewicz University;
- Ernst Kantorowicz (graduated in 1913) – historian, medievalist;
- Juliusz Willaume (graduated in 1922) – historian of the 19th century, political activist, in the interwar period a teacher in Marcinek;
- Włodzimierz Trzebiatowski (graduated in 1924) – chemist, professor at the Universities of Lviv and Wrocław;
- Franciszek Jaśkowiak (graduated in 1925) – sightseer, nature conservation advocate;
- Tadeusz Breza (graduated in 1926) – writer, theater critic, diplomat;
- Stanisław Kasznica (graduated in 1927) – the last Commander-in-Chief of the National Armed Forces;
- Kazimierz Flatau (graduated in 1928) – harpsichordist and physicist;
- Zbigniew Kiedacz (graduated in 1928) – Colonel of the Polish Army, commander of the 15th Poznań Uhlan Regiment;
- Jerzy Waldorff (graduated in 1928) – writer and music publicist (alumni of St. Mary Magdalene Gymnasium in Poznań;
- Ignacy Subera (graduated in 1928) – Polish Catholic clergyman, full professor and dean of the Faculty of Canon Law at the Academy of Catholic Theology in Warsaw;
- Piotr Zaremba (graduated in 1928) – urban planner, first Polish president of Szczecin;
- Kirył Sosnowski (graduated in 1929) – activist of the national camp, member of the Home Army, co-founder of the underground organization Ojczyzna;
- Jan Kasznica (graduated in 1930) – soldier of the September Campaign;
- Alfons Klafkowski (graduated in 1931) – lawyer, professor at Adam Mickiewicz University, president of the Constitutional Tribunal in the years 1985–1989;
- Włodzimierz Gedymin (graduated in 1934) – military pilot in the September Campaign, soldier of the Home Army;
- Stefan Borsukiewicz (graduated in 1938) – poet, soldier of the 1st Independent Parachute Brigade;
- Janusz Przybysz (graduated in 1946) – novelist, satirist;
- Stefan Stuligrosz (graduated in 1946) – conductor, choirmaster, creator of the Poznań Nightingales choir (alumni of St. Maria Magdalena Gymnasium in Poznań);
- Czesław Mielcarski (graduated in 1947) – botanist;
- August Chełkowski (graduated in 1948) – scouting activist, senator, speaker of the senate of the first term;
- Zdzisław Krasiński (graduated in 1949) – economist, associate professor, minister, member of the Council of Ministers of the Polish People's Republic in the years 1981–1985;
- Ryszard Danecki (graduated in 1950) – poet, novelist, translator of English, Russian and German poetry;
- Antoni Gąsiorowski (graduated in 1950) – historian, professor at the Polish Academy of Sciences;
- Lech Konopiński (graduated in 1950) – poet, satirist;
- Antoni Dziatkowiak (graduated in 1951) – heart surgeon;
- Marek Sewen, or Henryk Ładoga (graduated in 1951) – composer and conductor;
- Lech Trzeciakowski (graduated in 1951) – historian, professor at the Adam Mickiewicz University;
- Dariusz Świerczewski (graduated in 1954) – basketball player, Rome 1960 Olympian;
- Andrzej Legocki (graduated in 1956) – chemist and molecular biologist, professor at the Polish Academy of Sciences;
- Bogdan Marciniec (graduated in 1958) – professor of chemistry, rector of the Adam Mickiewicz University;
- Paweł Łączkowski (graduated in 1961) – deputy prime minister in the Cabinet of Hanna Suchocka;
- Janusz Nyczak (graduated in 1961) – theater director, winner of the Konrad Swinarski Award;
- Krzysztof Szyfter (graduated in 1962) – geneticist, chemist, professor of medical sciences;
- Stanisław Barańczak (graduated in 1964) – poet, translator, literary critic;
- Wojciech Kruk (graduated in 1964) – businessman and senator;
- Jarogniew Krüger (graduated in 1964) – sailor, Moscow 1980 Olympian;
- Andrzej Sobczak (graduated in 1964) – writer, satirist, radio presenter, columnist;
- Filip Bajon (graduated in 1965) – film director;
- Marek Karpiński (graduated in 1965) – computer scientist and mathematician, professor at the University of Bonn;
- Romuald Kujawski (graduated in 1965) – senior bishop of the Roman Catholic Diocese of Porto Nacional in Brazil;
- Lech Łotocki (graduated in 1965) – theater and film actor;
- Jan Węglarz (graduated in 1965) – computer scientist, professor at Poznań University of Technology;
- Grzegorz Bręborowicz (graduated in 1966) – professor of medical sciences, rector of Poznań University of Medical Sciences;
- Tadeusz Dziuba (graduated in 1966) – politician, voivode of Greater Poland from 2005 to 2007;
- Witold Szyfter (graduated in 1966) – laryngologist, professor of medical sciences;
- Marek Ziółkowski (graduated in 1966) – professor of sociology, senator and speaker of the Polish parliament;
- Marek Jędraszewski (graduated in 1967) – archbishop Metropolitan of the Archdiocese of Kraków;
- Piotr Kamiński (graduated in 1967) – music critic, translator and journalist;
- Tomasz Schramm (graduated in 1967) – professor of history at the Adam Mickiewicz University;
- Tomasz Dietl (graduated in 1968) – professor of physics at the Polish Academy of Sciences and the University of Warsaw;
- Andrzej Lesicki (graduated in 1968) – professor of biology, pro-rector of Adam Mickiewicz University;
- Zygmunt Vetulani (graduated in 1968) – mathematician and computer scientist, professor at Adam Mickiewicz University;;
- Maciej Musiał (graduated in 1969) – governor of Greater Poland from 1997 to 1999, head of the Prime Minister's Office from 2000 to 2001;
- Roman Słowiński (graduated in 1969) – computer scientist, professor at Poznań University of Technology;
- Wojciech Fibak (graduated in 1971) – tennis player, businessman;
- Małgorzata Hendrykowska (graduated in 1971) – film historian;
- Marek Król (graduated in 1972) – publisher and editor-in-chief of Wprost;
- Leszek Sikorski (graduated in 1974) – Minister of Health in the Cabinet of Leszek Miller;
- Radosław Ratajszczak (graduated in 1976) – president of the Wrocław Zoo;
- Julia Przyłębska (graduated in 1978) – lawyer, president of the Constitutional Tribunal;
- Przemysław Czapliński (graduated in 1981) – professor of literature;
- Katarzyna Bujakiewicz (graduated in 1991) – actress;
- Dominika Kulczyk (graduated in 1996) – CEO of the Kulczyk Foundation;
- Weronika Glinkiewicz (graduated in 1997) – sailor, Atlanta 1996 Olympian;
- Przemysław Osiewicz (graduated in 1998) – professor at the Adam Mickiewicz University;
- Sebastian Kulczyk (graduated in 1999) – CEO of the Kulczyk Investments.

== Position in the rankings ==
Position in the rankings of the monthly magazine Perspektywy.

Year	Poland	Greater Poland	Poznań	Source
2017	75th place	4th place	4th place	
2018	89th place	6th place	5th place	
2019	75th place	4th place	4th place	
2020	86th place	5th place	4th place	
2021	82th place	6th place	5th place	
2022	85th place	6th place	4th place	
2023	47th place	4th place	4th place	

== Alumni Association ==
In 1989, at the initiative of the organizing committee for the 70th anniversary celebrations of the school, the Alumni Association of the Karol Marcinkowski Gymnasium and High School in Poznań was established. On 4 April of that year, it was registered under number 167 in the Register of Associations and Unions of the Social-Administrative Department of the Voivodeship Office in Poznań, and on 27 September, it was registered under number 196 in the Regional Court in Poznań. The founding meeting took place on 24 April 1989. Zbigniew Krüger was elected as the president of the association at that time. After his resignation on 18 February 1993, Gerard Sowiński, a Polish language teacher from 1964 to 1980, assumed the position. The association's authorities are elected every four years.

The objectives of the association include maintaining collegial ties and providing assistance to the members of the association as well as to the students and alumni of the school, preserving the bonds of the alumni with the school and the region of the Greater Poland. These objectives are pursued through the promotion of publications related to the history of the school, the achievements of the patron, and the alumni; fostering patriotic ideals of the school and its patron; providing assistance to the school in the education and upbringing of students; and organizing various meetings, events, and ceremonies. Since 1989, the association has been responsible for organizing jubilee celebrations of the school, held every five years, and since 1995, it has also organized annual meetings on the occasion of the five-year anniversaries of the matura exams. Since 1994, the association has also managed the Alumni Library, where publications by the school's alumni are collected.

== In culture ==
Even though the name of the high school is not mentioned in any of Małgorzata Musierowicz's books, it is recognized that almost all the youth in Jeżycjada attend Marcinek.

Two feature films were shot in the building: Limuzyna Daimler-Benz in 1981, directed by the school's graduate Filip Bajon, and Felix, Net i Nika oraz Teoretycznie Możliwa Katastrofa in 2012, directed by Wiktor Skrzynecki.

From October 1928 until the outbreak of World War II, the school published a monthly magazine called Orlęta, which eventually gained a national character and began to be subscribed to abroad. From September 1966 for many years, the school published the Tygodnik Żakowski magazine. The rest of the numerous periodicals had a more episodic nature. From 2004 to 2015, the school published a magazine for teachers titled Pedagogia, addressing the topic of Polish education.

Since 2001, the school has been annually organizing the Marcinek Theatre Festival in Poznań, attracting theaters from all over Poland and abroad. It has been under the media patronage of TVP3 Poznań and Gazeta Wyborcza. The jury has included figures such as Juliusz Tyszka, Paweł Szkotak, and Sergiusz Sterna-Wachowiak.

In 2016, the school became the first in Poznań to receive a license to organize a local TED conference under the name TEDxMarcinekSchool. Since then, five editions have been organized: in April and November 2016, January 2017, February 2018, and February 2019.

== Bibliography ==
- Cecha, Ela (2014). Nasza stara dobra szkoła... 95-lecie "Marcinka" 1919–2014 (in Polish). Poznań: NAKOM. ISBN 978-83-63919-14-6.
- Gronek, Barbara; Gronek, Tomasz (2009). 90-lecie "Marcinka" 1919–2009 (in Polish). Poznań: NAKOM. ISBN 978-83-89529-58-9.
- Gronek, Tomasz (2004). 85 lat "Marcinka" 1919–2004 (in Polish). Poznań: NAKOM. ISBN 83-86969-97-0.
