= Poznań uprising =

Poznań uprising can refer to:

- Greater Poland Uprising (1846)
- Greater Poland Uprising (1848)
- Greater Poland Uprising (1918–1919)
- Poznań 1956 protests
