= Matetsky =

Matetsky is a surname. It's an English-language form of Russian name Матецкий. Notable people with the surname include:

- Vladimir Matetsky (born 1952), Russian composer

Polish writing of the name is Matecki

- Teodor Teofil Matecki
