= Kazimierz Flatau =

Polish harpsichordist and translator

Kazimierz Flatau (11 July 1910 in Warsaw – 25 July 2000 in Poznań) was a Polish harpsichordist, music critic, physicist, translator, and astrologist. He established school of harpsichord in Poznań, Poland.

== Education and life ==
Flatau attended Karol Marcinkowski (I Liceum Ogólnokształcące im. Karola Marcinkowskiego) high school in Poznań. He graduated from the Mathematics and Natural Sciences department of the University of Poznań. At the same time he attended Music Conservatoire (university music school) in Poznań. In 1931 he studied under Wanda Landowska at the École de Musique Ancienne in Saint-Leu-la-Forêt.

Most of his life he was associated with district of Poznań-Jeżyce.

== Music ==
He was excellent harpsichordist and specialized in baroque music. In 1948 he established class of harpsichord in the Music Academy in Poznań (at that time called Państwowa Wyższa Szkoła Muzyczna in Poznań). His student, Zofia Brenczówna, followed him as the head. From 1946 until 1950 he performed live on Polish national radio together with Jan Rakowski. As a soloist, he played music of Johann Sebastian Bach and other composers. He represented the Poznań Music Academy as a juror during the first and second International Ancient Music Competition in Łódź in 1961 and 1964.

== Translator ==
He was a polyglot and translator and worked for several Polish science journals including Acta Physica Polonica. During his lifetime, since 1965, he translated about 1000 journal articles. He was translator of music scores. Flatau participated during the jury deliberations of Henryk Wieniawski Violin Competition (in 1952 and 1957) and International Frederick Chopin Piano Competition (1955), and was translating during the World Congress of Intellectuals for Peace, held in August 1948 in Wrocław.

== Literature and poetry ==
He was a poet and belonged to literary group "Gold Mosaic" (Złota Mozaika) together with F. M. Nowowiejski, L. Turkowski and K. Alberti. In 1946/1947, he was literary and music critic for the Zryw magazine. In 1948/1949 he wrote for the Music and Theatre Echo (Echo Teatralne i Muzyczne).

== Bibliography ==
- Hanna Kostrzewska, Kazimierz Flatau, Ars Nova, Poznań, 2007, ISBN 978-83-88392-18-4.
