= Witalis Ludwiczak =

Polish ice hockey player

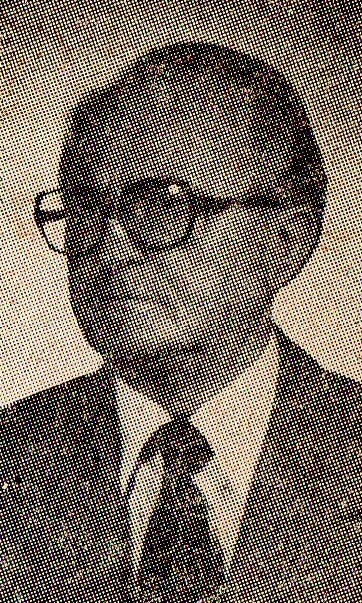
- Witalis Ludwiczak
- Born: April 20, 1910; Poznań, Poland
- Died: June 17, 1988 (aged 78); Poznań, Poland
- Education: University of Poznań
- Occupations: Lawyer, educator
- Children: 2
Ice hockey career
- Height: 180 cm (5 ft 11 in)
- Weight: 78 kg (172 lb; 12 st 4 lb)
- Position: Defenseman
- Played for: AZS Poznań (1930-1937); Polish Olympic team (1932 and 1936); Pogon Katowice (1937-1939)
- Coached for: Polish national team (1954-1955)
- National team: Poland
- Military career
- Allegiance: Poland
- Conflicts: September Campaign (World War II)

Witalis Ludwiczak (April 20, 1910, Poznań – June 17, 1988, Poznań) was a Polish lawyer specializing in civil law and private international law; professor ordinarius of Adam Mickiewicz University; a rower; and an ice hockey player who competed in 1932 and 1936 Winter Olympics. He was the first Olympian from Poznań.

== Biography ==
Ludwiczak was a graduate of Saint Mary Magdalene Gymnasium in Poznań (1929) and of the Faculty of Law and Economics at University of Poznań (1935), where he got his Master of Jurisprudence degree. He also received a Doctor of Juridical Science degree there in 1946. He began his career as a Professor of Civil Law at the AMU Faculty of Law and Administration, where he became a professor ordinarius (1969).

He played for AZS Poznań's youth group before joining their professional team. Between 1931 and 1939, he represented the national team 47 times and scored 3 goals. In 1932 he was a member of the Polish ice hockey team which finished fourth in the Olympic tournament. He played all six matches. Four years later, he participated with the Polish team in the 1936 Olympic tournament. He played all three matches. In 1933, he was the Polish champion in coxless fours 1933 and competed in the European Championships in rowing.

Ludwiczak fought in the September Campaign of World War II and was later interned by Nazis in Oflag II-C. After the war, he coached the Polish national team in during the 1955-1956 World Championships. Between 1957 and 1970, he was also president of AZS.

He received the Gold Cross of Merit and the Knight's and Officer's Crosses of the Order of Polonia Restituta, and in 1985 was made a Knight of the Kalos Kagathos Medal for excellence in sport.
