= Teodor Teofil Matecki =

Teodor Teofil Matecki (25 April 1810 – 15 May 1886) was a Polish medical doctor, social activist and member of Poznań Society of Friends of Learning. He died in his home town of Poznań.

== Early life ==
Matecki was born in Poznań and educated at the Mary Magdalene High School which was the oldest secondary school in Poznań, founded at the beginning of 14th century. Nevertheless, he decided to quit school in order to take part in the November Uprising. He was awarded for his bravery afterwards but the Prussian authorities punished him for the participation in the uprising by sentencing him to three months in prison. He achieved a secondary school certificate in 1833 in Wrocław and started his medicine studies at the university therein. He received the degree of doctor of medicine in 1837 and then he fulfilled his residency in Berlin. He went to live in Poznań the following year.

== Career ==
He linked his work as a doctor with social, national and political activities. He tried to follow Karol Marcinkowski by helping the destitute. Meanwhile, he collaborated with an underground movement that was preparing an uprising in Greater Poland. His main task included storing medicaments. He was captured in 1846 and sent to prisons in Poznań, Sonnenburg, Hausvogtei and Moabit. He was sentenced to 6 years in prison and a fine but the revolution that took place in 1848 set him free. He established hospitals in Śrem, Września and Miłosław (where insurgents were treated). In 1848-1849 Matecki played a significant role in fighting epidemic of cholera. He also engaged himself in helping the wounded later on, especially during the January Uprising over a dozen years later.

After the year 1848 he was active as a doctor and popularizer of science. He belonged to a number of scientific associations. He was author of numerous articles concerning medicine as well as chemistry, physics, mathematics and astronomy.

== Personal life ==
He was married to Apolonia née Szuman from 1840.
