= Maksymilian Jackowski =

Polish activist

Maksymilian Jackowski (11 October 1815 in Slupia, Grand Duchy of Posen – 14 January 1905 in Posen) was a Polish activist, secretary-general of the Central Economic Society (Centralne Towarzystwo Gospodarcze), patron of the agricultural circles.
