= Andrzej Lesicki =

Polish biologist

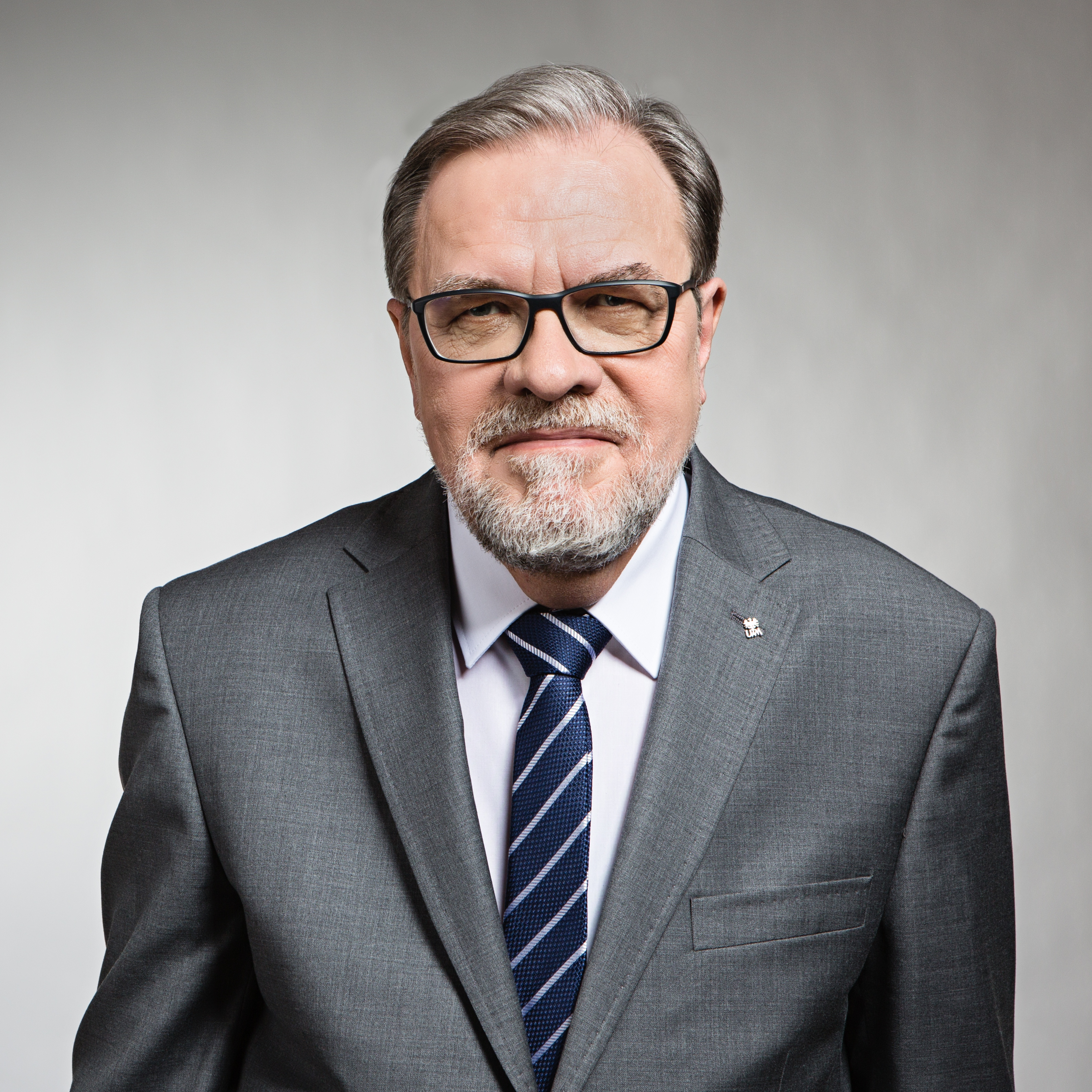
Andrzej Lesicki in 2016

Andrzej Lesicki (born 8 October 1950) is a Polish biologist, zoologist, malacologist and a professor at Adam Mickiewicz University, Poznań (AMU), in Poland. Between 2008 and 2016 he was Vice-President of AMU responsible for human resources and development and is now AMU's Rector for the term of office from 2016 until 2020.

== Life and career ==
He graduated from the Karol Marcinkowski High School in 1968, then studied zoology at AMU and graduated with honors in 1973. Following the completion of his studies he was employed by AMU where he pursued his academic career. He wrote his doctoral dissertation on “Hormonal regulation of phosphofructokinase and pyruvate kinase activity in hepatopancreas and abdominal muscle of Orconectes limosus Raf. Crayfish” and earned his Ph.D. in 1973. In 1994 he earned his post-doctoral degree on the basis of research accomplishments and his post-doctoral dissertation on “Phosphofructokinase and pyruvate kinase of some crustacean and insect tissues".

As an academic, he first worked in AMU's Department of Animal Physiology between 1973 and 2003 and then from 2003 to 2005 in the Department of Cytology and Histology. Since 2005 he has been working as a professor and head of the Department of the Biology of Cell in the Institute of Experimental Biology of AMU's Faculty of Biology.

A founding member of the Association of Polish Malacologists (APM) in 1994, he was first the association's treasurer, then its Vice-President and then became APM's President. He is editor-in-chief of Folia Malacologica, a research periodical published by APM and that of Biological Letters, a half-yearly, published by Poznańskie Towarzystwo Przyjaciół Nauk and AMU's Faculty of Biology. In the years 1998-2003 he was a member of the Polish Zoological Society and since 2010 he has been a member of the Freshwater Biological Association.

He also conducted research abroad, at the University of Oxford, UK in 1984 as well as several times between 1997 and 2001 at the University of Luton, UK and at the Hochschule Vechta, Germany.

He has performed important functions at AMU. Between 1996 and 2002 he was Vice-Dean and from 2002 until 2008 Dean of the Faculty of Biology. He served as AMU's Vice-President from 2008 to 2016. On 4 April 2016 he was elected AMU Rector for the term of office from 2016 to 2020.

In 2014 he completed MBA post-graduate studies offered jointly by AMU and the Poznan University of Economics.

== Awards and honors ==
- He has been distinguished by the Hipolit Cegielski Society with a silver medal "Labor omnia vincit" for the popularization of the idea of organic work and with a statuette "Honorary Hipolit".
- He has been awarded by the Ministry of Higher Education for his post-doctoral dissertation and received several awards at AMU.
- Asteroid 82937 Lesicki, discovered by Petr Pravec and Peter Kušnirák at Ondřejov Observatory in 2001, was named in his honor. The official naming citation was published by the Minor Planet Center on 6 April 2019 (M.P.C. 112432).
