= Służewo, Kuyavian-Pomeranian Voivodeship =

Służewo
- Village
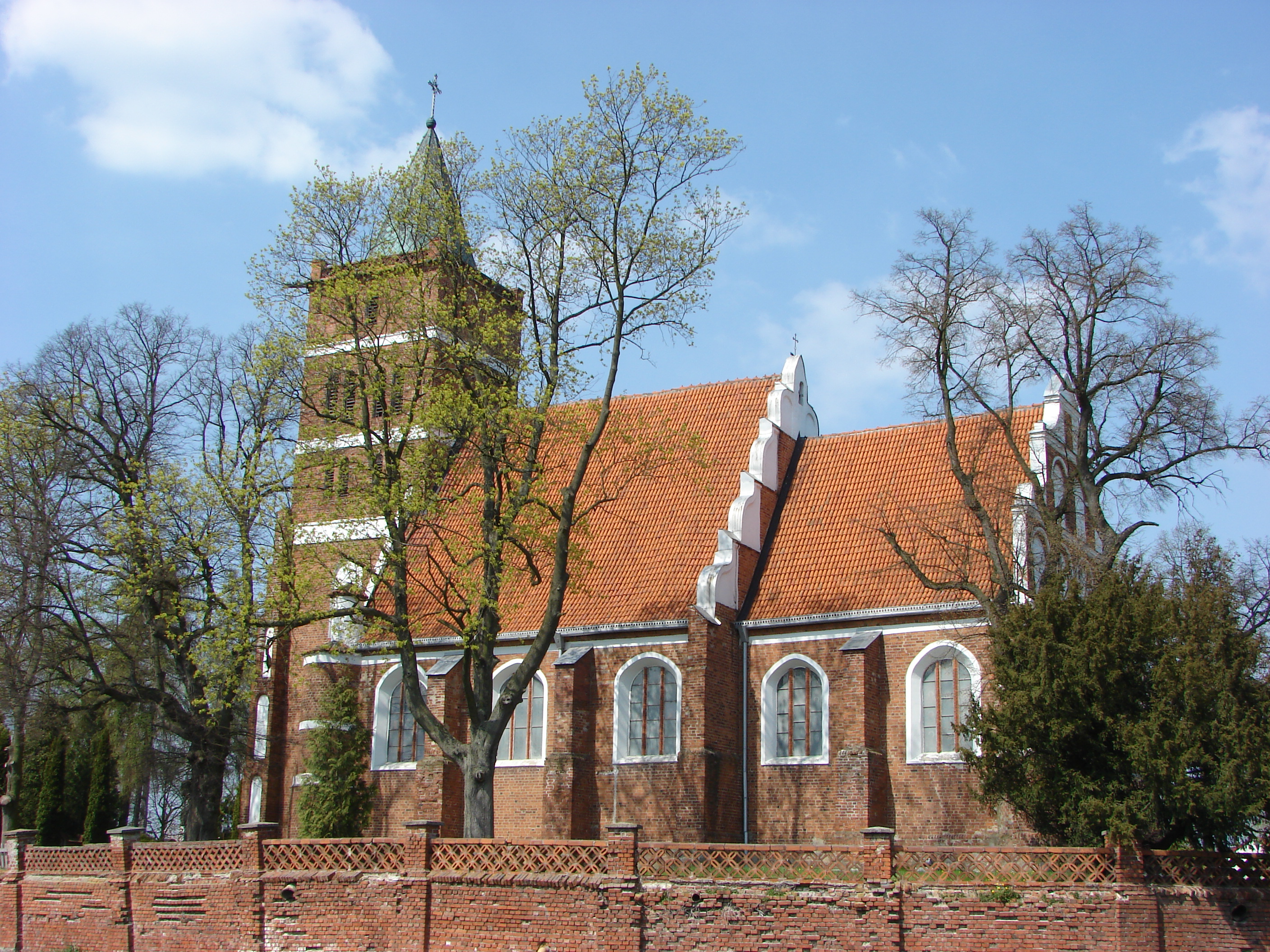
- St. John the Baptist's church, built AD 1560.

- Location within Poland
- Coordinates: 52°51′N 18°39′E
- Country: Poland
- Voivodeship: Kuyavian-Pomeranian
- County: Aleksandrów
- Gmina: Aleksandrów Kujawski
- Population: 1,180
- Time zone: UTC+1 (CET)
  - Summer (DST): UTC+2 (CEST)
- Vehicle registration: CAL

Służewo [swuˈʐɛvɔ] is a village in the administrative district of Gmina Aleksandrów Kujawski, within Aleksandrów County, Kuyavian-Pomeranian Voivodeship, in north-central Poland. It is located in Kuyavia.

== History ==
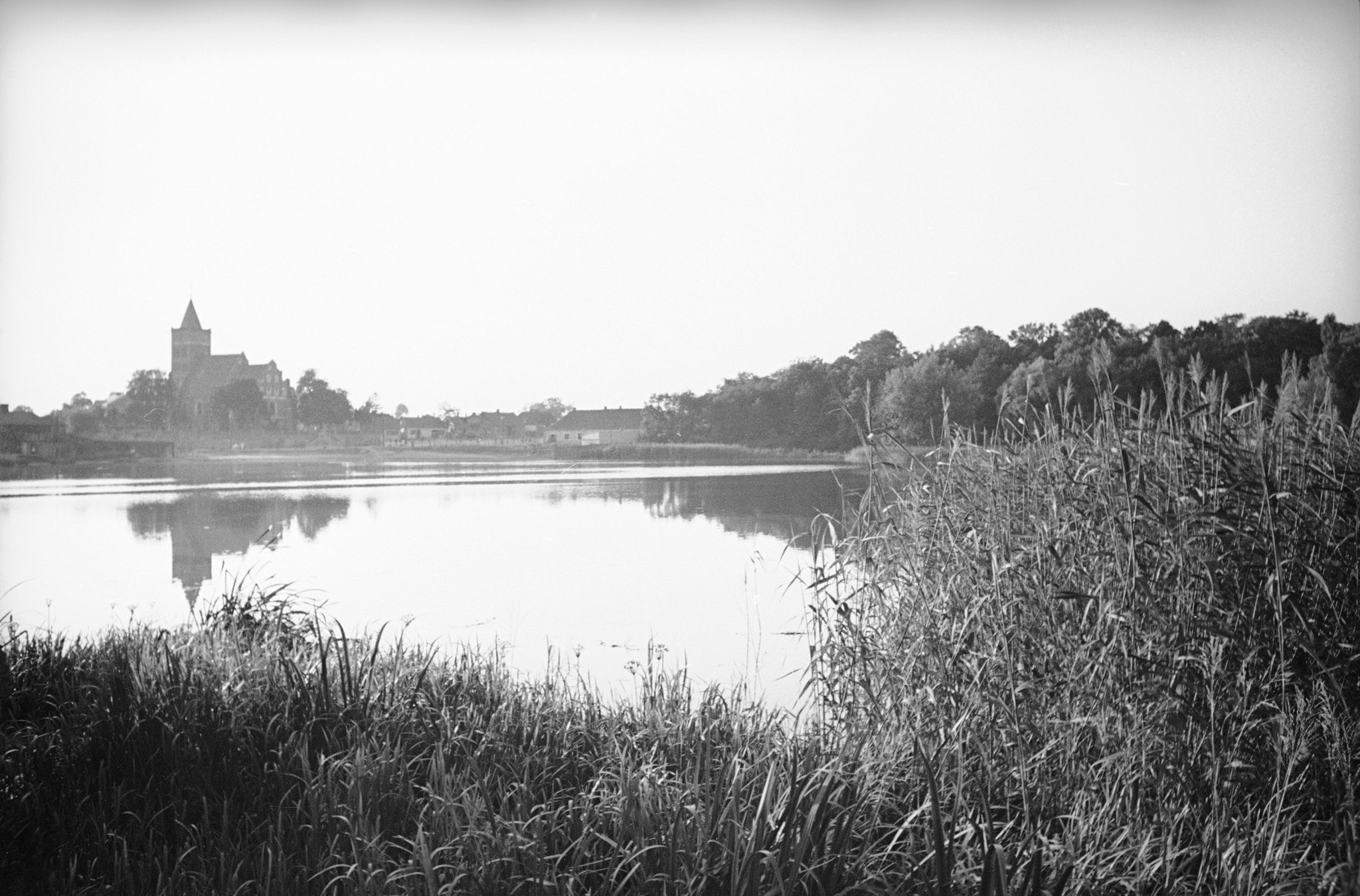
View of Służewo from the lake in 1939

Służewo was located on a trade route connecting Toruń and Warsaw.

Several Poles from Służewo were among the victims of a massacre committed by German troops in nearby Koneck during the German invasion of Poland at the start of World War II in September 1939 (see also: Nazi crimes against the Polish nation). During the subsequent German occupation, in 1939–1940, the occupiers carried out expulsions of Poles, whose houses and farms were then handed over to Germans as part of the Lebensraum policy. Expelled Poles were either deported to the General Government in the more eastern part of German-occupied Poland or enslaved as forced labour of new German colonists in the area.

Before the war, the village had a Jewish population of about 250. After several years of persecution during the German occupation, including many sent to slave labor camps, the remaining Jews in the town were rounded up in April 1942, held in a local church for several days, then deported to the Chełmno extermination camp where they were gassed. There were only two Jewish survivors from Służewo.

== Sights ==
Sights of Służewo include the Gothic-Renaissance St. John the Baptist's church, a Baroque park, a preserved old hand pump, historic tenements houses and monuments to composer Fryderyk Chopin and Pope John Paul II.

== Notable people ==
- Maria Wodzińska (1819–1896), Polish painter who was once engaged to composer Fryderyk Chopin
- Józef Kościelski (1845–1911), poetand politician, member in German Reichstag
