= Central Economic Society for the Grand Duchy of Poznań =

The Central Economic Society for the Grand Duchy of Poznań (Polish: Centralne Towarzystwo Gospodarcze dla Wielkiego Księstwa Poznańskiego) was a social-economic organization of Polish landowners in the Greater Poland region (at this time called the Grand Duchy of Poznań) established at a meeting held 13–17 February 1861 as a result of a merger of several local societies.

Its main goal was to promote modern agricultural methods by organizing meetings, speeches, debates, excursions and competitions and also publishing the newspapers and magazines. Its main publication was Ziemianin (The Landowner). Its secondary activities were trade of amazing agricultural products and organizations of the agricultural labour force.

The society was managed by the Chairman (Przewodniczący) and the Central Board (Zarząd Centralny), whose main role was to coordinate the work of the central sections and the branch societies with their own managing boards. The society and its 14 branches had 800 members (as of 1914).

== Chairmen ==
- Adolf Łączyński
- Jan Działyński
- Hipolit Cegielski
- Włodzimierz Wolniewicz
- Henryk Szuman
- Zygmunt Szułdrzyński
- Stanisław Żółtowski
- Tadeusz Jackowski
- Tadeusz Szułdrzyński

== Famous members and activists ==
- Maksymilian Jackowski (1815–1905) was a Polish activist, secretary-general of the Central Economic Society (Centralne Towarzystwo Gospodarcze), patron of the agricultural circles.
- Władysław Niegolewski (1819–1885) was a Polish liberal politician and member of parliament, insurgent in Greater Poland Uprising 1846, Greater Poland Uprising 1848 and January Uprising 1863, cofounder of the Central Economic Society (CTG) in 1861 and People's Libraries Society (TCL) in 1880.

== The divisions of the Central Board ==
- Technical-Industrial Division (Wydział Techniczno-Fabryczny), which evolved later into a Brewing Division (?) (Wydział Gorzelniczy), and next into a separate branch society: Towarzystwo Gorzelników
- Forestry Division (Wydział Leśny), later changed into a separate Forestry Society (Towarzystwo Leśne)
- General Division (Wydział Ogólny)
- Agriculture Division (Wydział Rolny)
- Stock Raising Division (Wydział Chowu Inwentarza)
- Labour Affairs division (Wydział Spraw Robotniczych)
