= Leon Michał Przyłuski =

Polish Latin Catholic Bishop

His Excellency Leon Przyłuski
- Archbishop of Gniezno; Primate of Poland Primate of Poland
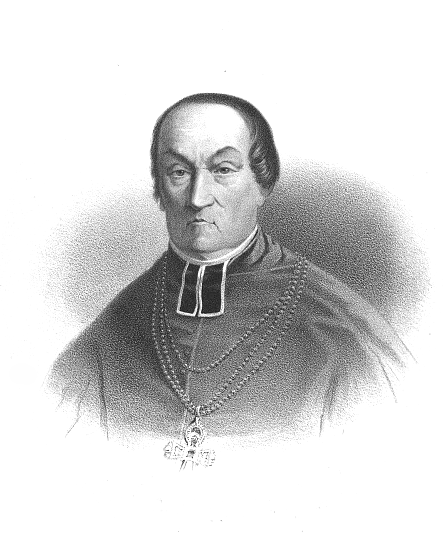
- Church: Catholic
- Archdiocese: Gniezno
- Installed: 1845
- Term ended: 1865

Orders
- Ordination: 4 June 1814
- Consecration: 27 April 1845

Personal details
- Born: 5 September 1789 Strzeszynek
- Died: 12 March 1865 (aged 75) Poznań
- Coat of arms

Leon Michał Przyłuski (1789–1865) was a Polish Catholic Bishop who was Archbishop of Gniezno and Primate of Poland from 1845 to 1865. He was an active participant in the Polish independence movement of the late 1800s.

== Early life ==
Przyłuski was born in 1789 (probably on October 5) in Strzeszynku, to father, Stanisław (1747-1843) of the Lubicz noble family and his mother Sarah Wal (1750-1848). In 1806, he studied at the seminary in Poznań and from 1811 to 1813 at the University of Wroclaw. He was ordained in 1814.

In 1817, he received a doctorate in Laws. and was made a pastor in Podgorne. In 1823, he was transferred to Śrem (Schrimm).

From 1824 to 1825 and in 1831, he served as vicar general and oficjała Archdiocese of Poznań and from 1843 to 1844 in the office of vicar of the Curia of Gniezno.

In 1845, he was on a list of candidates approved by the King of Prussia, and the Pope approved his selection on 27 April 1845.

== Career as primate ==
As a bishop, he advocated for representation of Polish national to the Prussian Government. In January 1846, the Prussian government forced him to make an announcement denouncing the Wielki Poland Uprising, but in March 1848, he stood at the head of the deputation to the Prussian King concerning the maintenance of the autonomy of the Grand Duchy of Poznań. He also corresponded with the authorities in Berlin at this time. He urged priests to support the opposition to the Division of the Grand Duchy.

In 1857, he was the (first) honorary president of Poznań society of friends of Science.

== End of his primacy ==
His support for the uprisings of the early 1860s caused the authorities to approach the Vatican in 1862 to seek the removal of Przyłuski as archbishop. In 1865, the Pope decided to create Przyłuski a cardinal, but Przyłuski died before this became effective.

He died on 12 March 1865 in Poznań. He is buried in the Poznań Cathedral. His heart, according to his will and testament, is in the basement of the Cathedral of Gniezno.
