= Małgorzata Musierowicz =

Polish writer (born 1945)

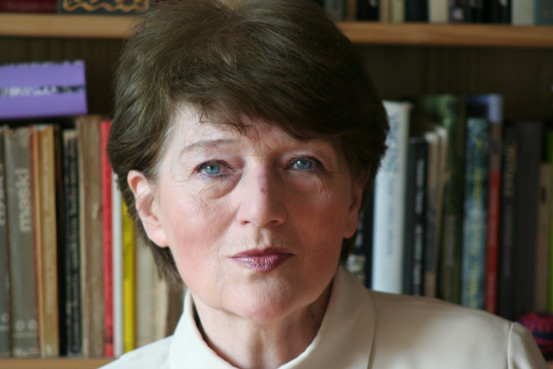
- Małgorzata Musierowicz (2008)
- Born: Małgorzata Barańczak; January 9, 1945 (age 81); Jeżyce, Poznań, Greater Poland, Poland
- Occupation: writer
- Notable work: Jeżycjada

Małgorzata Musierowicz (born January 9, 1945) is a popular Polish writer, author of many stories and novels for children and teenagers, but read with pleasure by adults too. She is the sister of poet and translator Stanisław Barańczak.

== Life and career ==
Musierowicz was born in Poznań, Poland. She went to VII Liceum Ogólnokształcące im. Dąbrówki in Poznań. She graduated from the Art University in Poznań with an MFA degree in graphic design. She frequently contributes articles to a Polish opinion magazine, Tygodnik Powszechny. Her first book, Małomówny i rodzina, was published in the mid-1970s. She soon started to publish a series of humorous novels; the volumes are referred to as Jeżycjada. The name Jeżycjada derives from the name of a district in Poznań, Jeżyce where all her characters live. Musierowicz also wrote books for younger children. Her books Kłamczucha, Kwiat Kalafiora and Ida Sierpniowa were adapted for films directed by Anna Sokolowska.

In 1982 her book Cauliflower Flower was awarded the Hans Christian Andersen Award. Her book Noelka has been entered on the Polish List of the International Board of Books for Young People (IBBY). In 2008 she got awarded the Medal of the Polish section by IBBY. Her novels have been translated into many languages, incl. for Czech, German, Swedish, Hungarian, and Japanese.

== Books ==
=== Jeżycjada ===
- 1975 Małomówny i rodzina
- 1977 Szósta Klepka (The Sixth Stave)
- 1979 Kłamczucha (Liar)
- 1981 Kwiat kalafiora (The Flower of the Cauliflower)
- 1981 Ida Sierpniowa (August Ida)
- 1986 Opium w Rosole (Opium in Chicken Soup)
- 1988 Brulion Bebe B. (The Jotterbook of Bebe B.)
- 1992 Noelka
- 1993 Pulpecja
- 1993 Dziecko piątku (Friday's child)
- 1994 Nutria i Nerwus (Nutria and Nerwus)
- 1996 Córka Robrojka (Robrojek's daughter)
- 1998 Imieniny (Name Day)
- 1999 Tygrys i Róża (Tiger and Rose)
- 2002 Kalamburka
- 2004 Język Trolli (Trolla's language)
- 2005 Żaba (The Frog)
- 2006 Czarna polewka (Duck Blood Soup)
- 2008 Sprężyna (Driving Force)
- 2012 McDusia
- 2014 Wnuczka do Orzechów (Granddaughter of Walnuts)
- 2015 Feblik
- 2018 Ciotka Zgryzotka (Aunt Anguish)

=== Bambolandia ===
- 1978 Czerwony helikopter (Red helicopter)
- 1982 Ble-ble
- 1985 Kluczyk
- 1989 Światełko

=== "Poczytaj mi mamo" series ===
- Co mam (What I Have)
- Rybka (Little fish)
- Bijacz (Beater)
- Boję się (I am scared)
- Kredki (Crayons)
- Kurczak (Chicken)
- Znajomi z zerówki (Kindergarten Friends)
- Hihopter
- Tempusek
- 1990 Kluseczki (Dumplings)

=== Other books ===
- Łasuch literacki
- Tym razem serio
- Całuski pani Darling (Mrs. Darling's Kisses)
- 1997 Frywolitki, czyli ostatnio przeczytałam książkę!
- 2000 Frywolitki 2, czyli ostatnio przeczytałam książkę!
- 2005 Frywolitki 3
- 2007 Na Gwiazdkę
- 2008 Dla Zakochanych (For People In Love)

There have been also many books and articles written about Musierowicz and her books.
