= Jeżycjada =

Book series by Małgorzata Musierowicz

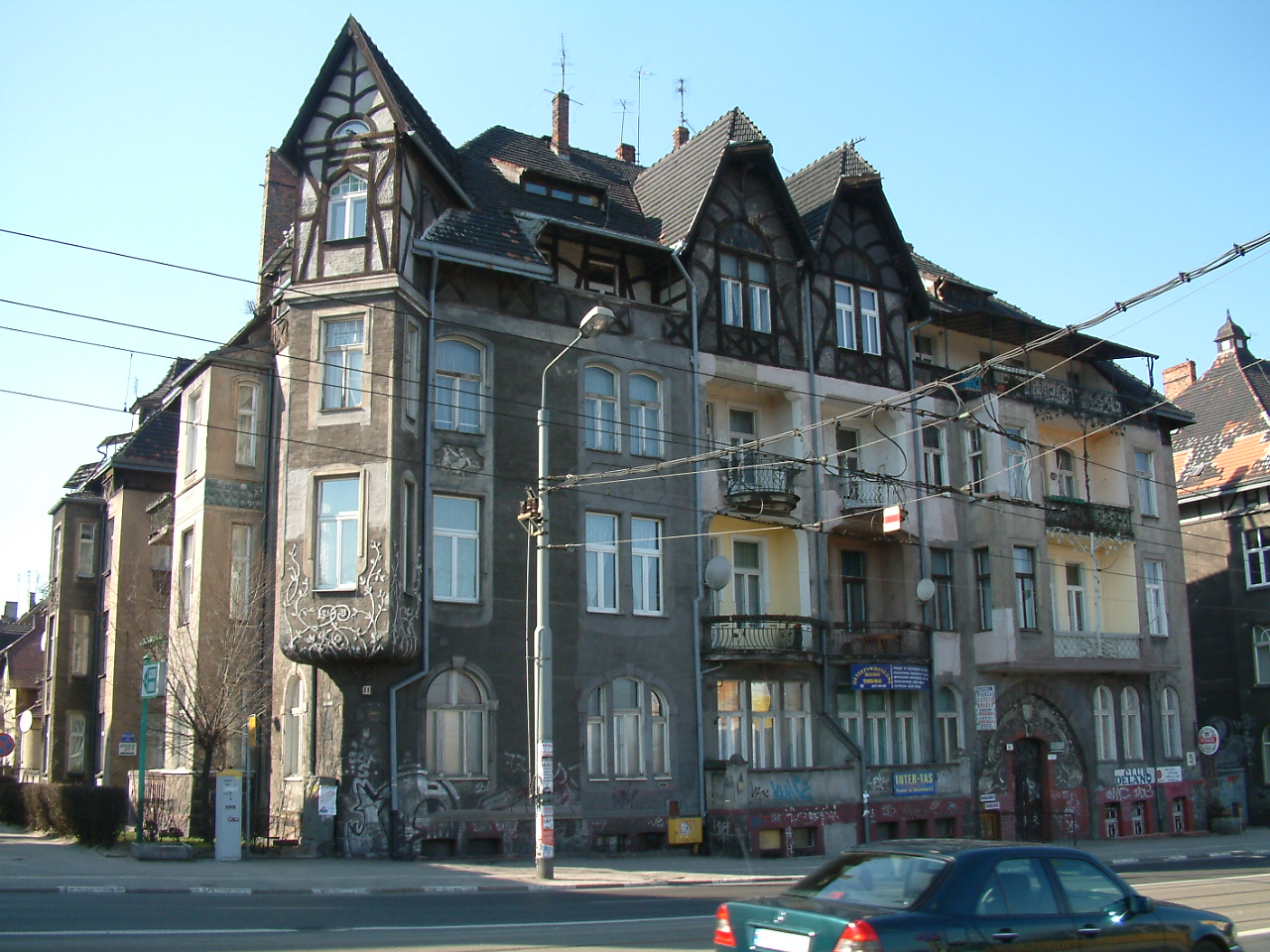
Art Nouveau building on ul. F. D. Roosevelta 5 (5 Roosevelt St.) in Poznań, where the (fictional) Borejko family inhabits a ground floor flat facing the street

Jeżycjada is a series of books for young people by Polish author Małgorzata Musierowicz. Its name derives from the Poznań district Jeżyce. Professor Zbigniew Raszewski, an admirer of the series and a friend of the author, invented this title jokingly referring to the Iliad (Polish: "Iliada"). The first part of the cycle (Szósta klepka) was published in 1977, and the newest (Ciotka Zgryzotka) is from 2018. A continuation of the cycle is planned. The books are very popular among Poles, both children and young people alike.

== Description ==
Almost every book from the cycle is set in Poznań. Musierowicz refers to real places (e.g. Roosevelt street), and events (workers' protests in June 1956).

The main core of Jeżycjada constitutes Borejko’s family, who live in the hundred years tenement at Roosevelt street.

Every volume is devoted to one person, although there are numerous references to other figures. The action of the book usually takes place in the sequence of a few days or weeks. Although individual volumes are independent of each other and it is possible to read them individually, there are many allusions and references hardly understandable without reading prior parts.

The books were translated into dozens of languages; “Noelka” was awarded the title of "The Book of the Year" by the Polish IBBY department. “Kwiat Kalafiora” was included in the Hans Christian Andersen Award-Honour List.

A movie entitled "ESD" was produced on the basis of the events described in “Ida Sierpniowa” and the “Kwiat Kalafiora”. “Kłamczucha” also has its film version. There is also a joint publication of Silesian University scientists “Między Bambolandią i Jeżycjadą: Małgorzaty Musierowicz makro- i mikrokosmos and a book by Krzysztof Biedrzycki “Małgorzata Musierowicz i Borejkowie”

Following volumes of 'Jeżycjada' have been published so far:

0. 1975 Małomówny i rodzina

1. 1977 Szósta klepka

2. 1979 Kłamczucha

3. 1981 Kwiat kalafiora

4. 1981 Ida sierpniowa

5. 1986 Opium w rosole

6. 1990 Brulion Bebe B.

7. 1992 Noelka

8. 1993 Pulpecja

9. 1993 Dziecko piątku

10. 1995 Nutria i Nerwus

11. 1996 Córka Robrojka

12. 1998 Imieniny

13. 1999 Tygrys i Róża

14. 2001 Kalamburka

15. 2004 Język Trolli

16. 2005 Żaba

17. 2006 Czarna polewka

18. 2008 Sprężyna

19. 2012 McDusia

20. 2014 Wnuczka do orzechów

21. 2015 Feblik

22. 2018 Ciotka Zgryzotka

== Characters ==
Ignacy Borejko is the patriarch of the family. Born in 1935, he holds a degree in classical philology and works as a librarian. Characterised by his erudition, calm demeanour, and dry wit, he frequently quotes Latin phrases, often to the confusion of his conversational partners—notably his daughters' suitors. Deeply immersed in philosophical reflections and literature, he serves as an intellectual and moral authority for the family.

Melania (Mila) Borejko (née Kalemba) Born on 31 December 1935 to Zuzanna and Władysław Makowski. After their death during WWII, she has been raised by Gizela Kalemba (family friend and neighbour). Ignacy's wife. Professionally she was trained to be an economist, but corrections for publishing companies are the main source of income for her. Later on it is revealed that she is also a prolific playwright (although she uses pseudo Kal Amburka instead of her real name and surname). Being energetic, determined and frequently despotic, she is in fact sensitive and caring. Main character of "Kalamburka", where the reader gets familiar with her personal whereabouts preceding the year 2000.

Gabriela (Gaba) Stryba (née Borejko, by her first marriage Pyziak) Born on 15 October 1961, the eldest daughter of Mila and Ignacy, ex-wife of Janusz Pyziak, currently a wife of Grzegorz Stryba. She is a mother of three: Rose and Laura (whose father is Janusz Pyziak) and Grzegorz Ignacy (whose father is Grzegorz Stryba). She is a lecturer in Polish and Classical Department of languages at the university. Gabriela is energetic and mentally strong, kind, helpful and determined. She is the main character of “Kwiat Kalafiora”.

Ida Pałys (née Borejko) Born on 15 March 1964, second daughter of Ignacy and Mila. A wife of Marek Pałys, mother of three as well: Józef, Łucja and Kazimierz. Although in her early teenage years she used to be a hypochondriac, in her adult life she becomes a successful physician specializing in laryngology. Ida is charismatic and explosive, she tends to exaggerate problems. She's quick-witted; she often happens to be tactless, especially when she doesn't think before she act, but she always means to be helpful. She has indomitable character and inexhaustible will of bringing help. Main character of “Ida Sierpniowa”.

Natalia (Nutria) Rojek (née Borejko) Born in 1971, third daughter of Ignacy and Mila. As a child, she earned her nickname "Nutria" (en. coypu) thanks to her love for long baths and physical resemblance - due to her prominent incisor teeth. Wife of Robert Rojek (who is known among his friends as “Robrojek”), mother of twins: Szymon and Jędrzej. A teacher of Polish in a secondary school. Quiet, dreamy, withdrawn; Natalia is a vegetarian. Sensitive and delicate, however she is able to explode in the least expected moment if somebody is trying to force her to do something. Main character in “Nutria i Nerwus”.

Patrycja (Pulpecja) Górska (née Borejko) Born on 11 April 1973, the youngest daughter of Ignacy and Mila. A wife of Florian, Anna and Nora’s mother. She failed her maths matura exam because she fell in love and could not focus on learning. As the reader learns from the other books, she manages to successfully pass it later on and graduates from the Department of the Forest Administration. Sweet and calm, deeply in love with her husband. Main character of “Pulpecja”
