= People's Libraries Society =

Polish educational society in Prussia

- Towarzystwo Czytelni Ludowych
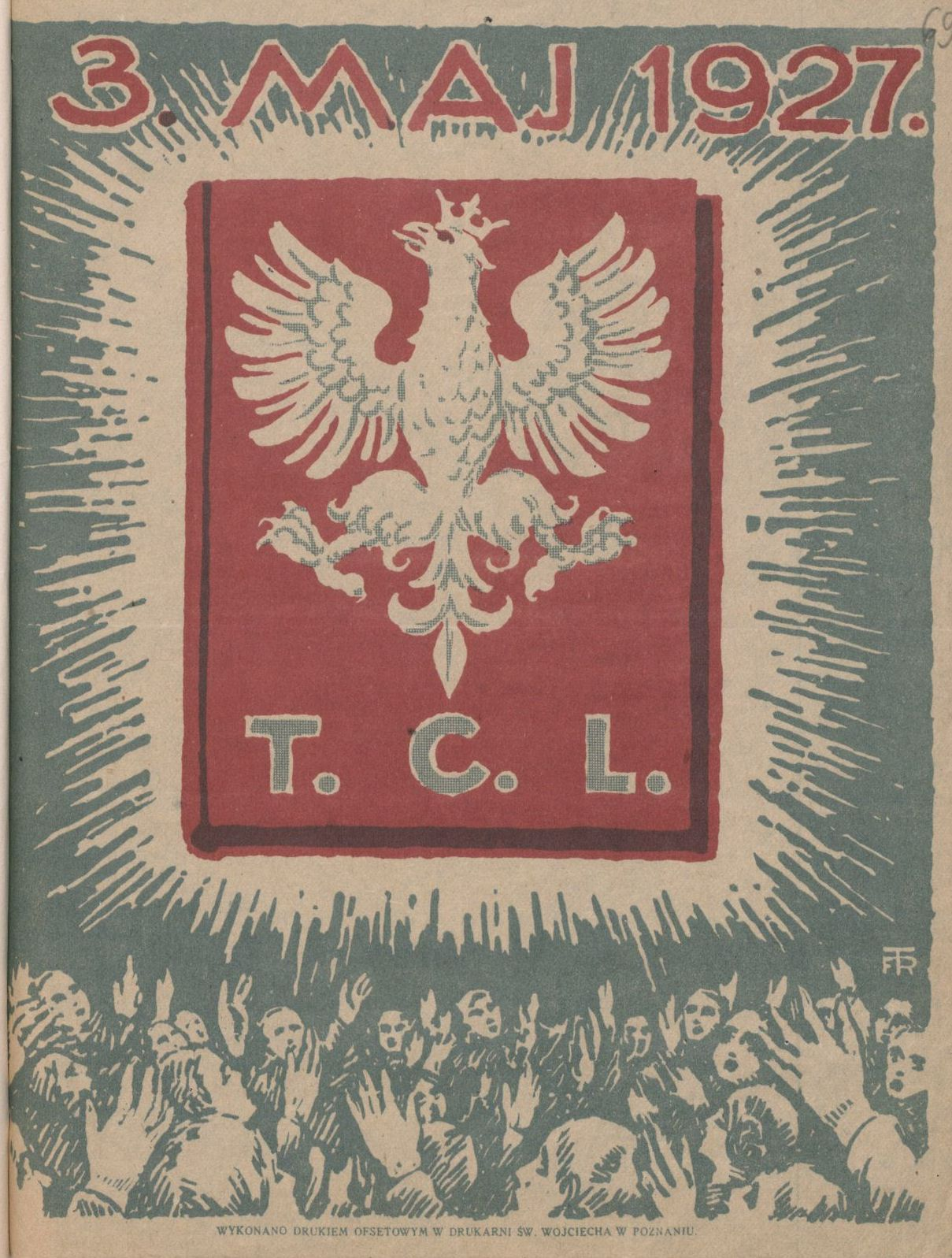
- A TCL poster commemorating the Constitution of 3 May, 1927
- Abbreviation: TCL
- Predecessor: Towarzystwo Oświaty Ludowej
- Established: October 1, 1880; 145 years ago
- Founded at: Posen, Province of Posen, German Empire
- Dissolved: 1950; 76 years ago
- Official language: Polish
- Key people: Władysław Niegolewski

People's Libraries Society (Polish: Towarzystwo Czytelni Ludowych (TCL)) was an educational society established in 1880 for the Prussian partition of Poland (active in the regions of Greater Poland or the Grand Duchy of Poznan, Pomerania, West Prussia, Kashubia and Silesia). Its main goal was to promote education in Polish amongst the people, especially the lower classes, and to revert the Germanisation practices of the Prussian authorities. The society established a network of libraries, reading rooms, and organized speeches. It was active until the outbreak of World War II in 1939, and it was dissolved in 1950.

== Famous members ==
- Władysław Niegolewski (1819–1885) was a Polish liberal politician and member of parliament, insurgent in Greater Poland Uprising (1846), Greater Poland Uprising (1848) and January Uprising (1863), cofounder of the Central Economic Society (CTG) in 1861 and People's Libraries Society (TCL) in 1880.
