= Stanisław Barańczak =

Polish poet, literary critic, scholar, editor, translator and lecturer (1946 – 2014)

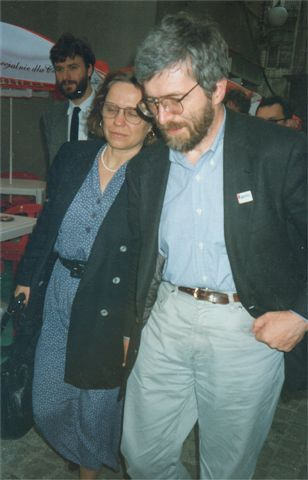
- Stanisław Barańczak with his wife Anna in 1995
- Born: November 13, 1946; Poznań, Poland
- Died: December 26, 2014 (aged 68); Newtonville, Massachusetts, US
- Resting place: Mount Auburn Cemetery, Cambridge, Massachusetts
- Education: Adam Mickiewicz University
- Occupations: poet, literary critic, translator
- Spouse: Anna Bryłka
- Children: Michael; Anna
- Relatives: Małgorzata Musierowicz (sister)
- Writing career
- Notable awards: Kościelski Award (1972); PEN Translation Prize (1996); Nike Award (1999); Silesius Poetry Award (2009); Medal for Merit to Culture – Gloria Artis (2014); Grand Cross of the Order of Polonia Restituta (2016)

Stanisław Barańczak (Polish pronunciation: [staˈɲiswav baˈrajnt͡ʂak], November 13, 1946 – December 26, 2014) was a Polish poet, literary critic, scholar, editor, translator and lecturer. He is perhaps most well known for his English-to-Polish translations of the dramas of William Shakespeare and of the poetry of E.E. Cummings, Elizabeth Bishop, Emily Dickinson, Wystan Hugh Auden, Seamus Heaney, Thomas Hardy, Gerard Manley Hopkins, Thomas Stearns Eliot, John Keats, Robert Frost, Edward Lear and others.

== Personal life ==
Born in Poznań, Poland on November 13, 1946, Barańczak was raised by his father Jan and mother Zofia, both doctors. He was the brother of the novelist Małgorzata Musierowicz. He studied philology at Poznań's Adam Mickiewicz University, where he obtained an M.A. and Ph.D. His doctoral dissertation concerned the poetic language of Miron Białoszewski. In 1968, he married Anna Bryłka, with whom he had two children, Michael and Anna.

== Career ==
Barańczak became a lecturer at Adam Mickiewicz University in Poznań. He broke into print as a poet and critic in 1965. Barańczak was on the staff of the Poznań magazine Nurt from 1967 to 1971. After the political events of June 1976, he became a co-founder of the Workers' Defence Committee (KOR) and of the clandestine quarterly Zapis. In 1981, the year Poland declared martial law, he left the country and accepted a three-year contract to work as a lecturer at Harvard University. He stayed at Harvard for almost two decades, leaving in 1999 due to complications with Parkinson's disease. He was a co-founder of the Paris Zeszyty Literackie (Literary Textbooks) in 1983, and a regular contributor to the periodical Teksty Drugie. He also served as editor of The Polish Review from 1986 to 1990.

Barańczak was a prominent representative of the Polish New Wave and is generally regarded as one of the greatest translators of English poetry into Polish and Polish poetry into English. He received the PEN Translation Prize with Clare Cavanagh in 1996. His book, Surgical Precision (Chirurgiczna precyzja), won the 1999 Nike Award - Poland's top literary prize. The language he employed in his works is highly evocative of the poetry of Emily Dickinson, John Donne and Robert Frost, with whom he felt strongest connection and whose literary legacy he helped popularize in Poland. Barańczak's own poetry deals with three major themes: the ethical, the political, and the literary. His language can be characterized as outstandingly fluent and flexible and the subject-matter of his poems seems to confirm his commitment to social issues. He started his literary career as "a poetic critic of language and the social order" but his greatest achievements came from his works as a late-20th-century Parnassist, a master of poetic form.

Barańczak introduced the concept of semantic dominant (Polish: dominanta semantyczna) in translations of poetry. The semantic dominant is a "key to the content" of the poem. It is a semantic or formal element that is most crucial and irreplaceable. It can take the form of rhyme, versification, syntax, or the other stylistic elements that prevail. The translator's task is to find the dominant feature of a given work and make it the most important translation element. This approach to poetry translations is based on heuristic model, which Barańczak described in his essay entitled: Mały, lecz maksymalistyczny manifest translatologiczny (Small but Maximalistic Translatological Manifest), included in his book: Saved in Translation: Sketches on the Craft of Translating Poetry.

Some of his poems were set to music by Jan Krzysztof Kelus.

== Death ==
Stanisław Barańczak died at the age of 68 after "a long debilitating disease" in Newtonville, Massachusetts on December 26, 2014. He was buried at Mount Auburn Cemetery.

== Bibliography ==
Each year below links to its corresponding "[year] in poetry" article:

Poetry:

- 1968, Korekta twarzy ("Facial Corrections"), Poznan: Wydawnictwo Poznanskie
- 1968, Dziennik poranny ("Morning Journal"), Poznan: Wydawnictwo Poznanskie
- 1970, Jednym tchem ("Without Stopping for Breath"), Warsaw: Orientacja
- 1977, Ja wiem, że to niesłuszne ("I Know It's Not Right"), Paris: Instytut Literacki
- 1978, Sztuczne oddychanie ("Artificial Respiration"), London: Aneks - English edition: Artificial Respiration (translated Chris Zielinski), Poetry World 2, March 1989.
- 1980, Tryptyk z betonu, zmęczenia i śniegu ("Triptych with Concrete, Fatigue and Snow"), Kraków: KOS
- 1986, Atlantyda i inne wiersze z lat 1981-85 ("Atlantis and Other Poems"), London: Puls
- 1988, Widokówka z tego świata ("A Postcard from the Other World"), Paris: Zeszyty Literackie
- 1990, 159 wierszy 1968-88 ("159 Poems"), Kraków: Znak
- 1994, Podróż zimowa ("Journey in Winter"), Poznan: a5
- 1997, Zimy i podroże ("Winter and Journeys"), Kraków: WL
- 1998, Chirurgiczna precyzja ("Surgical Precision"), Kraków: a5
- 2006, Wiersze zebrane, Kraków: a5, 2006

Light verse:

- 1991, Biografioly: poczet 56 jednostek sławnych, sławetnych i osławionych ("Biographies of 56 Celebrated, Famous or Notorious Individuals"), Poznan: a5
- 1991, Zwierzęca zajadłość: z zapisków zniechęconego zoologa ("Animal Ferocity: From the Notes of a Discouraged Zoologist"), Poznan: a5
- 1995, Słoń, trąba i ojczyzna ("The Elephant, the Trunk, and the Polish Question"), Kraków: Znak
- Pegaz zdębiał. Poezja nonsensu a życie codzienne: Wprowadzenie w prywatną teorię gatunków (Pegasus fell dumb. Nonsense poetry and everyday life: introduction to a private theory of genres), Puls, London 1995.

Literary criticism:

- 1973, Ironia i harmonia ("Irony and Harmony"), Warsaw: Czytelnik
- 1974, Język poetycki Mirona Białoszewskiego ("Miron Bialoszewski's Poetic Language"), Wrocław: Ossolineum
- 1979, Etyka i poetyka ("Ethics and Poetics"), Paris: Instytut Literacki
- 1981, Książki najgorsze 1975-1980 ("The Worst Books"), Kraków: KOS
- 1984, Uciekinier z utopii. O poezji Zbigniewa Herberta ("Fugitive from Utopia: On the Poetry of Zbigniew Herbert"), London: Polonia
- 1990, Tablica z Macondo. Osiemnaście prób wytłumaczenia, po co i dlaczego się pisze ("A License Plate from Macondo: Eighteen Attempts at Explaining Why One Writes"), London: Aneks
- 1992, Ocalone w tłumaczeniu. Szkice o warsztacie tłumaczenia poezji ("Saved in Translation: Sketches on the Craft of Translating Poetry"), Poznan: a5
- 1996, Poezja i duch uogólnienia. Wybór esejów 1970-1995 ("Poetry and the Spirit of Generalization: Selected Essays"), Kraków: Znak

Translations into Polish:

- E.E. Cummings
  - 150 wierszy (1983)
- William Shakespeare
  - Hamlet (1990)
  - Romeo i Julia (1990)
  - Jak wam się podoba (1990)
  - Król Lear (1991)
  - Burza (1991)
  - Kupiec wenecki (1991)
  - Sen nocy letniej (1991)
  - Zimowa opowieść (1991)
  - Makbet (1992)
  - Dwaj panowie z Werony (1992)
  - Poskromienie złośnicy (1992)
  - Otello (1993)
  - Juliusz Cezar (1993)
  - Komedia omyłek (1994)
  - Stracone zachody miłości (1994)
  - Wieczór Trzech Króli (1994)
  - Wiele hałasu o nic (1994)
  - Koriolan (1995)
  - Król Ryszard III (1996)
  - Tymon Ateńczyk (1996)
  - Wesołe kumoszki z Windsoru (1998)
  - Król Henryk IV część 1 (1998)
  - Król Henryk IV część 2 (1998)
  - Król Henryk V (1999)
  - Wszystko dobre, co się dobrze kończy (2001)
- Elizabeth Bishop, 33 wiersze (1995)
- Emily Dickinson
  - 100 wierszy
  - Drugie 100 wierszy (1995)
- Wystan Hugh Auden,
  - 44 wiersze (1994)
  - Morze i zwierciadło. Komentarz do "Burzy" Szekspira (published by Wydawnictwo a5, Kraków 2003)
- Seamus Heaney,
  - 44 wiersze (1994)
  - Ciągnąc dalej. Nowe wiersze 1991-1996 (1996)
  - Światło elektryczne (published by Wydawnictwo Znak, Kraków 2003)
- Thomas Hardy, 55 wierszy (1993)
- Gerard Manley Hopkins, 33 wiersze.
- Ursula K. Le Guin, Czarnoksiężnik z Archipelagu (published by Wydawnictwo Literackie 1983)
- Thomas Stearns Eliot, Koty (1995)
- Iosif Brodski (Joseph Brodsky), Znak Wodny (1993)
- Charles Simic, Madonny z dorysowaną szpicbródką oraz inne wiersze, prozy poetyckie i eseje (1992)
- Thomas Campion, 33 pieśni (1995)
- Andrew Marvell, 24 wiersze (1993)
- John Keats, 33 wiersze (1997)
- Robert Herrick, 77 wierszy (1992)
- Robert Frost, 55 wierszy (1992)
- George Herbert, 66 wierszy (1997)
- Edward Lear, 44 opowiastki (1998)
- Philip Larkin, 44 wiersze (1991)
- John Donne, 77 wierszy (1997)
- Paul Celan, Utwory wybrane (1998)
- Vladimir Bukowsky (Vladimir Bukovsky), I powraca wiatr ... (1999)
- Alexandr Galytch (Alexander Galich), Pytajcie, synkowie. Wiersze i piosenki (1995)
- James Merrill, Wybór poezji (1990)
- Natalia Gorbaniewska (Natalya Gorbanevskaya), Drewniany anioł. Wiersze
- Edward Lear, Lewis Carroll, W. S. Gilbert, A. E. Housman, Hilaire Belloc, 44 opowiastki wierszem (published by Wydawnictwo Znak 1998)
- Henry Vaughan, 33 wiersze (published by Wydawnictwo Znak 2000)
- Z Tobą więc ze Wszystkim: 222 arcydzieła angielskiej i amerykańskiej liryki religijnej (published by Wydawnictwo Znak 1992)
- Ocalone w tłumaczeniu: szkice o warsztacie tłumacza poezji z dodatkiem małej antologii przekładów-problemów (published by Wydawnictwo a5 Kraków 2004)
- Fioletowa krowa: antologia angielskiej i amerykańskiej poezji niepoważnej (published by Wydawnictwo a5 Kraków 2007)
- Ogden Nash, W świecie mułów nie ma regułów (published by Media Rodzina 2007)
- Peter Barnes, Czerwone nosy (published in Dialog, 1993, number 1-2, p. 35-101)
- Antologia angielskiej poezji metafizycznej XVII stulecia (published by PIW 1991)

Translations into English (anthologies):

  - 1989: The Weight of the Body: Selected Poems, Chicago: Another Chicago Press/TriQuarterly
  - 1987: A Fugitive From Utopia: The Poetry of Zbigniew Herbert, Cambridge, Massachusetts: Harvard University Press
  - 1995: Jan Kochanowski, Laments (with Seamus Heaney)

Translations into German (anthologies):

  - 1997: Panorama der Polnischen literatur des 20 Jahrhunderts, Zürich: Ammann
  - 1997: Polnische Lyrik Aus 100 Jahren, Gifkendorf: Merlin
