= Władysław Niegolewski =

Polish politician in Prussia (1819–1885)

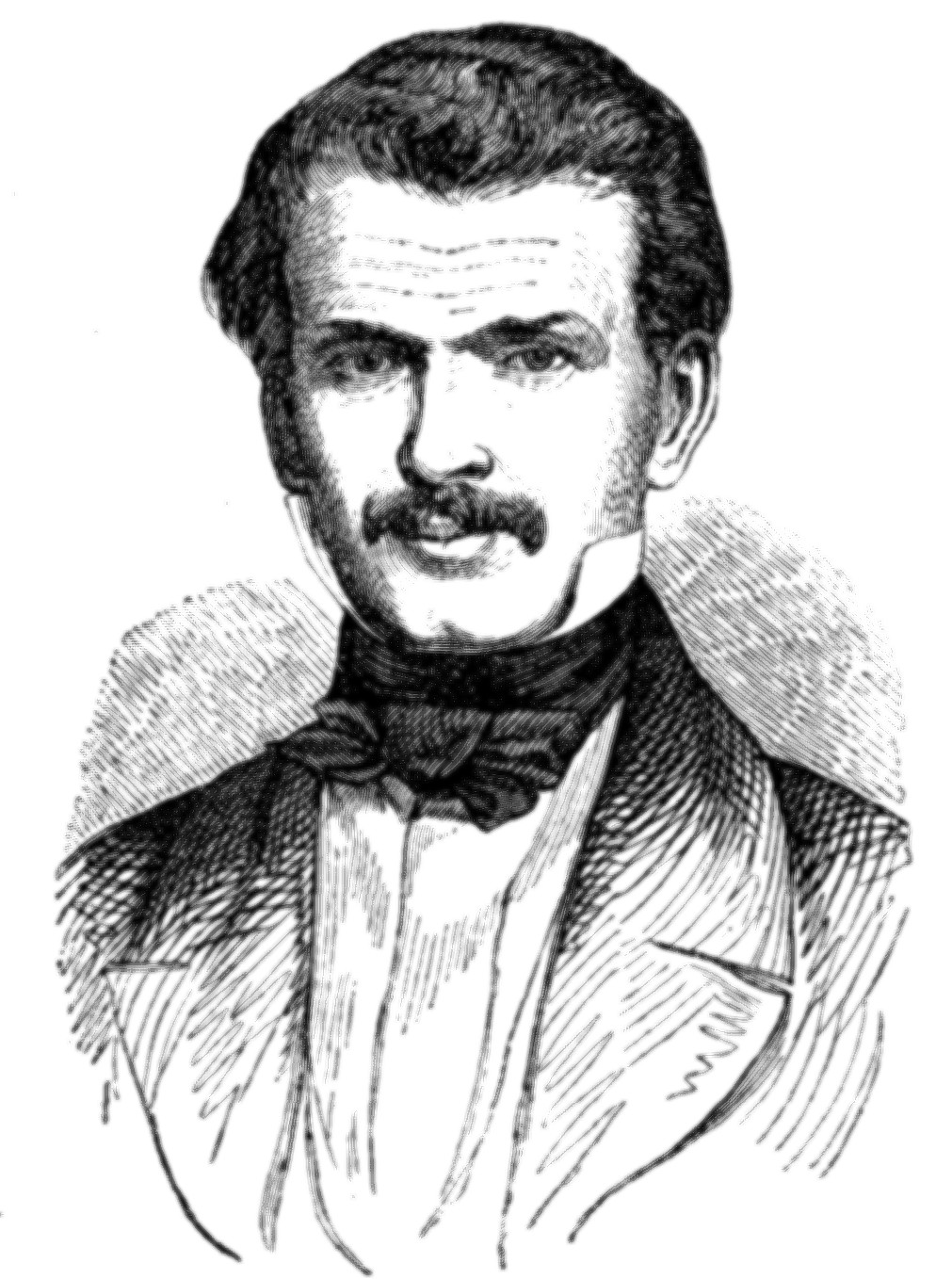

Władysław Niegolewski (1819, in Włościejewki – 1885) was a Polish liberal politician and member of thePrussian House of Representatives, an insurgent in Greater Poland Uprising 1846, the Greater Poland Uprising 1848 and the January Uprising 1863, cofounder of the Central Economic Society (CTG) in 1861 and People's Libraries Society (TCL) in 1880.

== See also ==
- Central Economic Society for the Grand Duchy of Poznań (est. 1861, Polish: Centralne Towarzystwo Gospodarcze dla Wielkiego Księstwa Poznańskiego, CTG) - promotion of modern agriculture
- People's Libraries Society (est.1880, Towarzystwo Czytelni Ludowych, TLC) promotion of education among the people
