= Wiktor Dega =

Polish orthopedist (1896–1995)

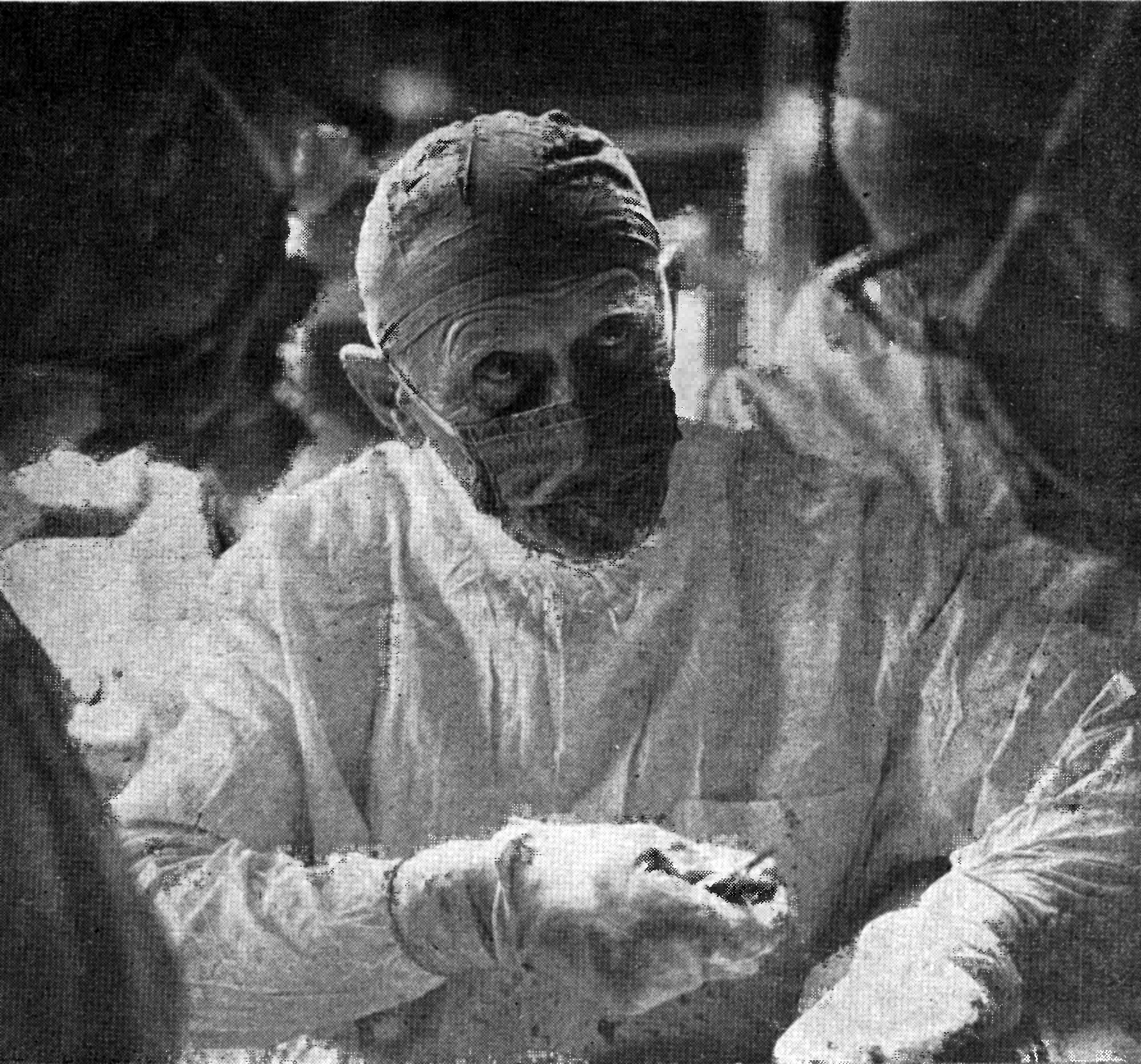
Wiktor Dega (1975)

Wiktor Dega (7 December 1896 – 16 February 1995) was a Polish surgeon and orthopedist who was well known for his work on polio. Dega served as an expert for the World Health Organization and was one of the founders of the Polish Orthopedic Society. He created new apparatus and devices to help accident victims and survivors of polio, as well as new therapies and operations for congenital dislocations of the hip.

Dega has been called "the father of rehabilitation in Poland."

== Biography ==
Dega was born in Poznań in 1896. He was drafted into the Prussian army in 1915; after matriculating (by correspondence) from the medical faculty of the University of Berlin, he was assigned to a Münchengladbach hospital.

Dega served in World War I. He fought on the northern, Galician and Volhynian fronts, and then later in Wielkopolska. After going on leave, he studied medicine at the University of Warsaw, then the University of Poznań. He then worked at the Poznań Orthopedic Institution, later becoming its head. He became the head of the orthopedic ward of the Municipal Hospital in Bydgoszcz in November 1937.

In 1939, Dega was drafted again into the army and was assigned to the District Military Hospital in Toruń. He later became the chief surgeon of a newly established field hospital. The Germans later occupied this hospital, and Dega became a prisoner of war. The institution was moved to Łowicz, then was shut down; Dega went to Warsaw. In May of 1940, he led the surgical ward of the Karol and Maria Children's Hospital, and provided medical assistance to insurgents and civilians after the Warsaw Uprising.

On 5 December 1945, Dega became the head of the Department and Orthopedic Clinic at the University of Life Sciences. He would later establish one of Poland's first rehabilitation centers for children: the Medical and Educational Institution for Disabled Children, in Świebodzin. Dega became rector of the Poznań Medical Academy on 21 May 1959 and served until resigning on 1 October 1961 due to poor health.

Dega died in Poznań on 16 February 1995.

== Personal life ==
Dega married Maria Żelewska, a pediatrician, on 21 November 1928. He had three children: Barbara, born 1932; Zofia, born 1934; and Michael, born 1944.
