= Józef Kościelski =

Polish poet and politician

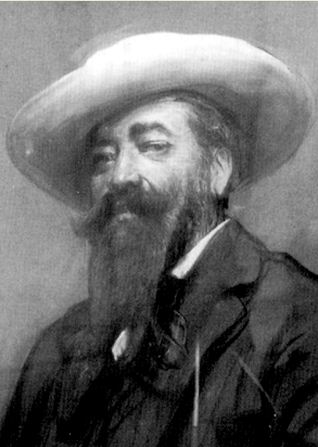
Józef Kościelski.

Józef Kościelski (9 November 1845, Służewo – 22 June 1911, Poznań) was a Polish poet, politician and parliamentarian, co-founder of the Straż (Guard) society.
