= Kazimierz Cwojdziński =

Polish mathematician and professor

Kazimierz Cwojdziński (born 8 January 1878 in Plewiska – died 12 August 1948 in Poznań) was a Polish mathematician and professor of the School of Engineering in Poznań. Cwojdziński published his works regarding secondary school curriculum and school mathematics in the journals Wiadomości Matematyczne, Muzeum, Parametr, and Matematyka as well as the German journal Archiv der Mathematik und Physik. He was among the first year-group to obtain a doctorate in mathematics from the Adam Mickiewicz University.

During the Nazi occupation of Poland in World War II Cwojdziński was one of the most active teachers in clandestine schools in Greater Poland.
