= Greater Poland Uprising (1846) =

Insurgency in Poland

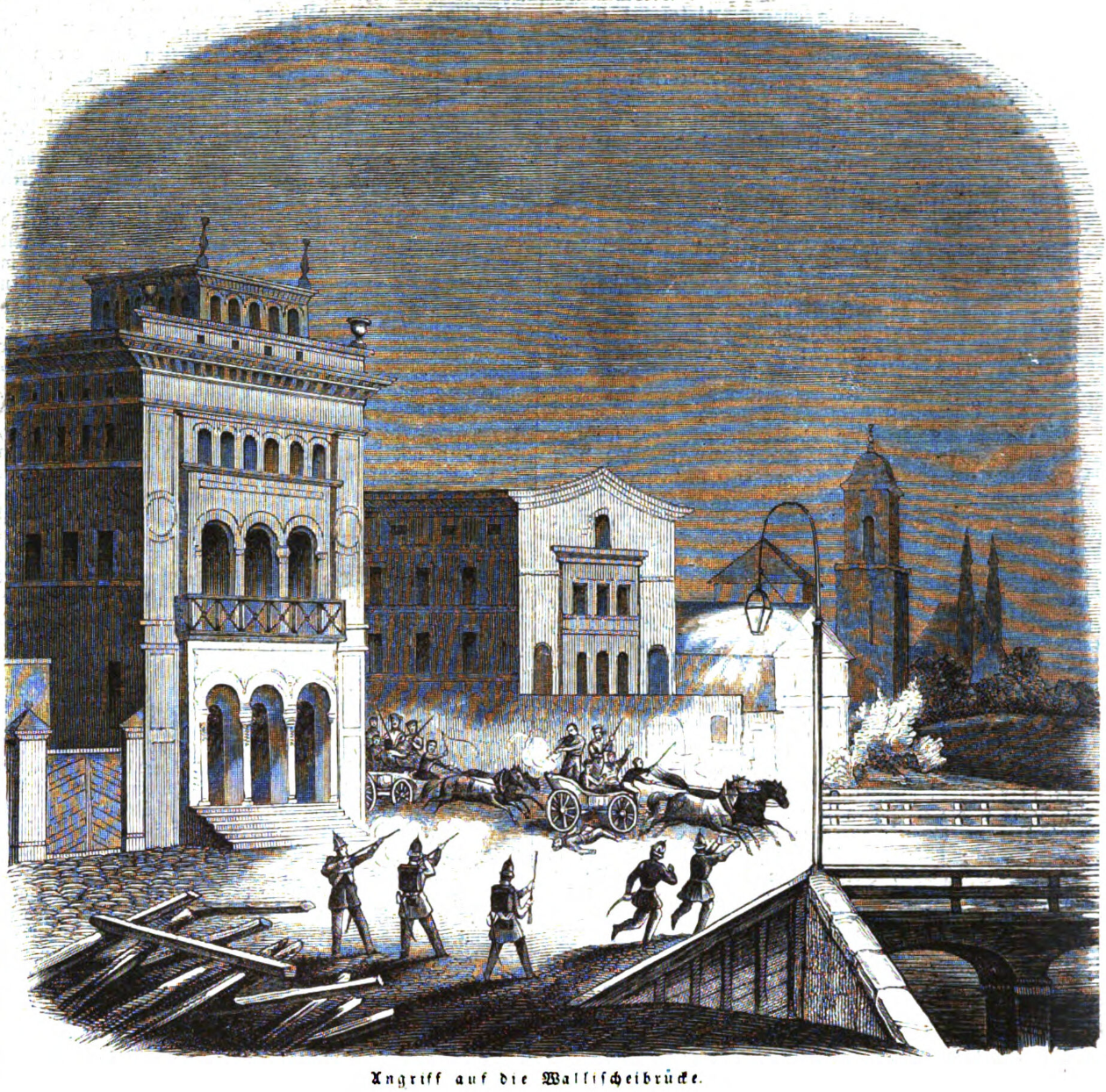
Attack on the Wallische (Chwaliszewski) Bridge, March 1846 (engraving by Julius von Minutoli)

The Greater Poland Uprising (Polish: powstanie wielkopolskie) was a planned military insurrection by Poles in the land of Greater Poland against the Prussian forces, designed to be part of a general Polish uprising in all three partitions of Poland, against the Russians, Austrians and Prussians.

== Plans ==
Plans to start an uprising across all parts of the partitioned Poland simultaneously on 21 February 1846 were made by several Polish organisations. In the Prussian Grand Duchy of Posen, Ludwik Mierosławski, who had recently arrived in Poznań out of French exile, was supposed to lead the military operations. While the Kraków Uprising in the Austrian partition was started but failed, the insurgents in Poznań were betrayed by a conspirator and the leaders of the organization were arrested by Prussian authorities two weeks before actions were supposed to start.

No serious hostilities occurred that year.

== Aftermath ==
254 insurgents were charged with high treason at the Berlin Kammergericht. The trial was the first one after a new criminal trial law was invented in Prussia. The hearing was now publicly accessible and caused a large interest among the populace of Berlin and Prussia in sympathy with the defendants. The trial ended on 2 December 1847, when 134 of the defendants were acquitted and returned to the Grand Duchy of Posen. 8 defendants, including Mierosławski, who had written his book "Débat en la révolution et la contrerévolution en Pologne" throughout his custody, were sentenced to death, the rest to prison in the Berlin-Moabit prison. The death sentences were not enforced and all convicts were amnestied by King Frederick William IV of Prussia on the demand of the revolutionary populace of Berlin in the Spring of Nations in March 1848. They immediately joined the Greater Poland Uprising of 1848.

== Famous insurgents ==
- Karol Libelt (1807–1875)
- Ludwik Mierosławski (1814–1878)
- Władysław Niegolewski (1819–1885) was a Polish liberal politician and member of parliament, an insurgent in the 1846 Wielkopolska Uprising, the 1848 Wielkopolska Uprising and the 1863 Uprising, and a cofounder (1861) of the Central Economic Society (TCL) and (1880) of the People's Libraries Society (CTG).
- Edmund Taczanowski (1822–1879) was a Prussian-Polish general, noble and Lord of Choryn who led a revolt in 1843 and participated in the 1846 Wielkopolska Uprising. He later served with Giuseppe Garibaldi in the Italian Risorgimento.
- Włodzimierz Krzyżanowski (1824–1887) was a brigade commander during the American Civil War.

== See also ==
- Galician peasant uprising of 1846
