= Karol Marcinkowski =

Polish physician and social activist

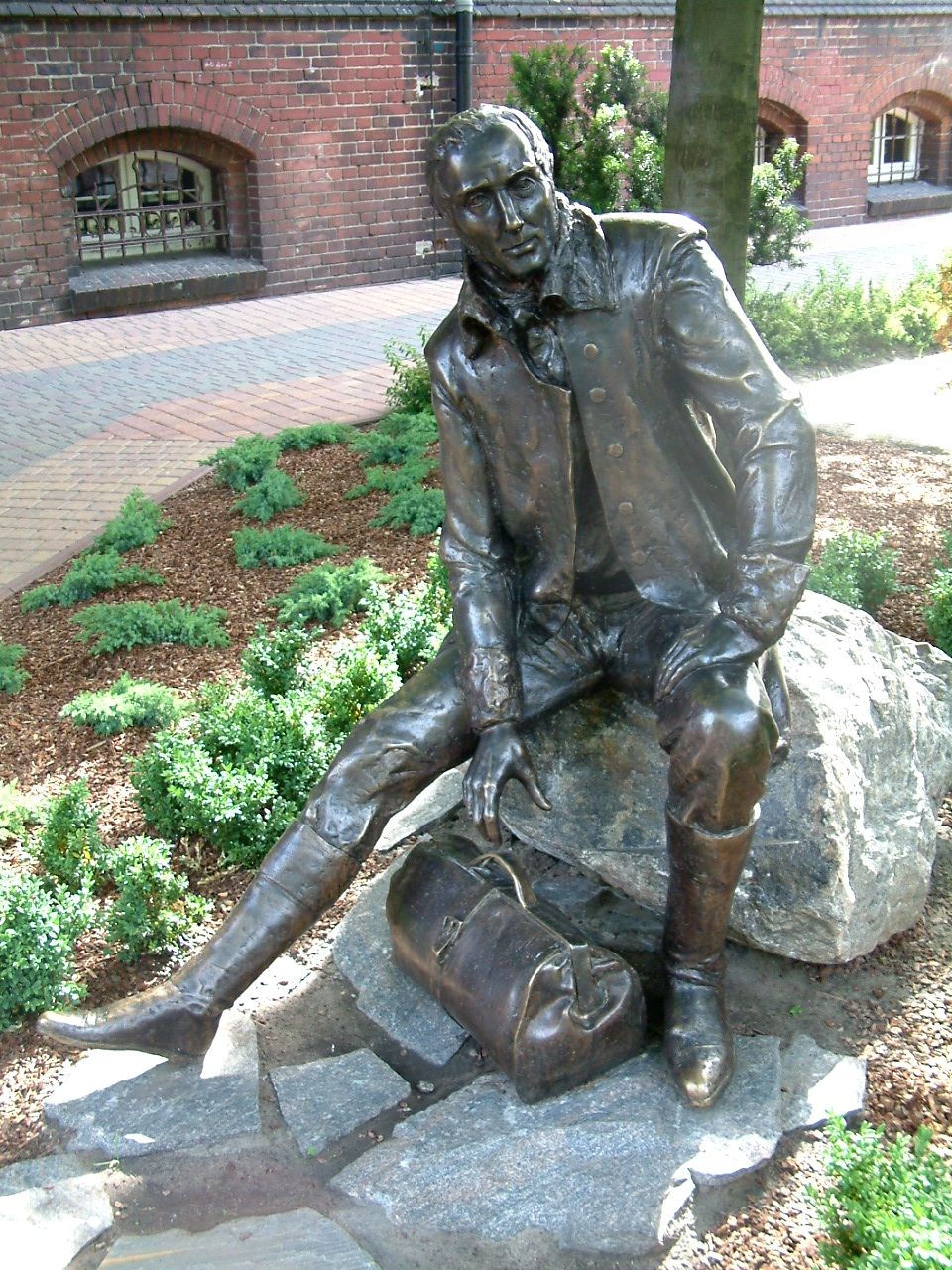
Monument of Karol Marcinkowski in front of Karol Marcinkowski High School in Poznań

Karol Marcinkowski (23 June 1800 in Posen, Kingdom of Prussia, today Poznań in Poland–6 November 1846) was a Polish physician, social activist in the Greater Poland region (also called the Grand Duchy of Posen), supporter of the basic education (Praca organiczna) programmes, organizer of the Scientific Help Society (Towarzystwo Pomocy Naukowej) and the Poznań Bazar (Bazar Poznański) - the Polish mall in Poznań that included a hotel, meeting rooms, crafts and shops.

== Membership in organizations ==
- Scientific Help Society for the Youth of the Grand Duchy of Poznań (est.1841), Towarzystwo Naukowej Pomocy dla Młodzieży Wielkiego Księstwa Poznańskiego - scholarship for poor youth.

== Schools named after Marcinkowski ==
- Poznan University of Medical Sciences (Uniwersytet Medyczny im. Karola Marcinkowskiego w Poznaniu)
- Karol Marcinkowski 1st High School in Poznań (I Liceum Ogólnokształcące im. Karola Marcinkowskiego w Poznaniu)
