= Grand Duchy of Posen =

Polish client state of the Kingdom of Prussia (1815-48)

Grand Duchy of Posen Großherzogtum Posen (German) Wielkie Księstwo Poznańskie (Polish)
- Client state of Prussia
- 1815–1848
- Flag Coat of arms

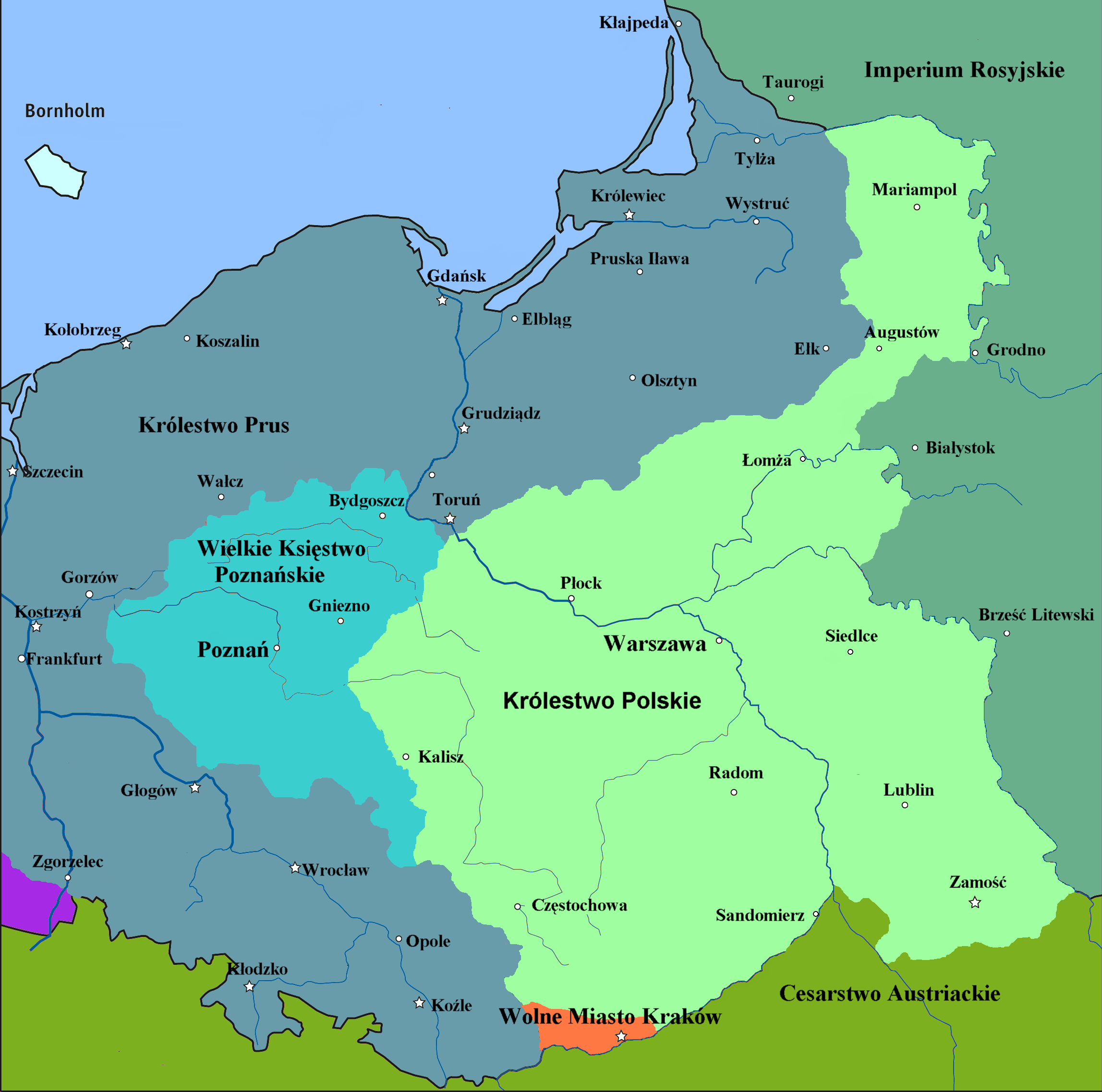
- The Grand Duchy of Posen in 1815 (aqua area in the west marked Wielkie Księstwo Poznańskie)

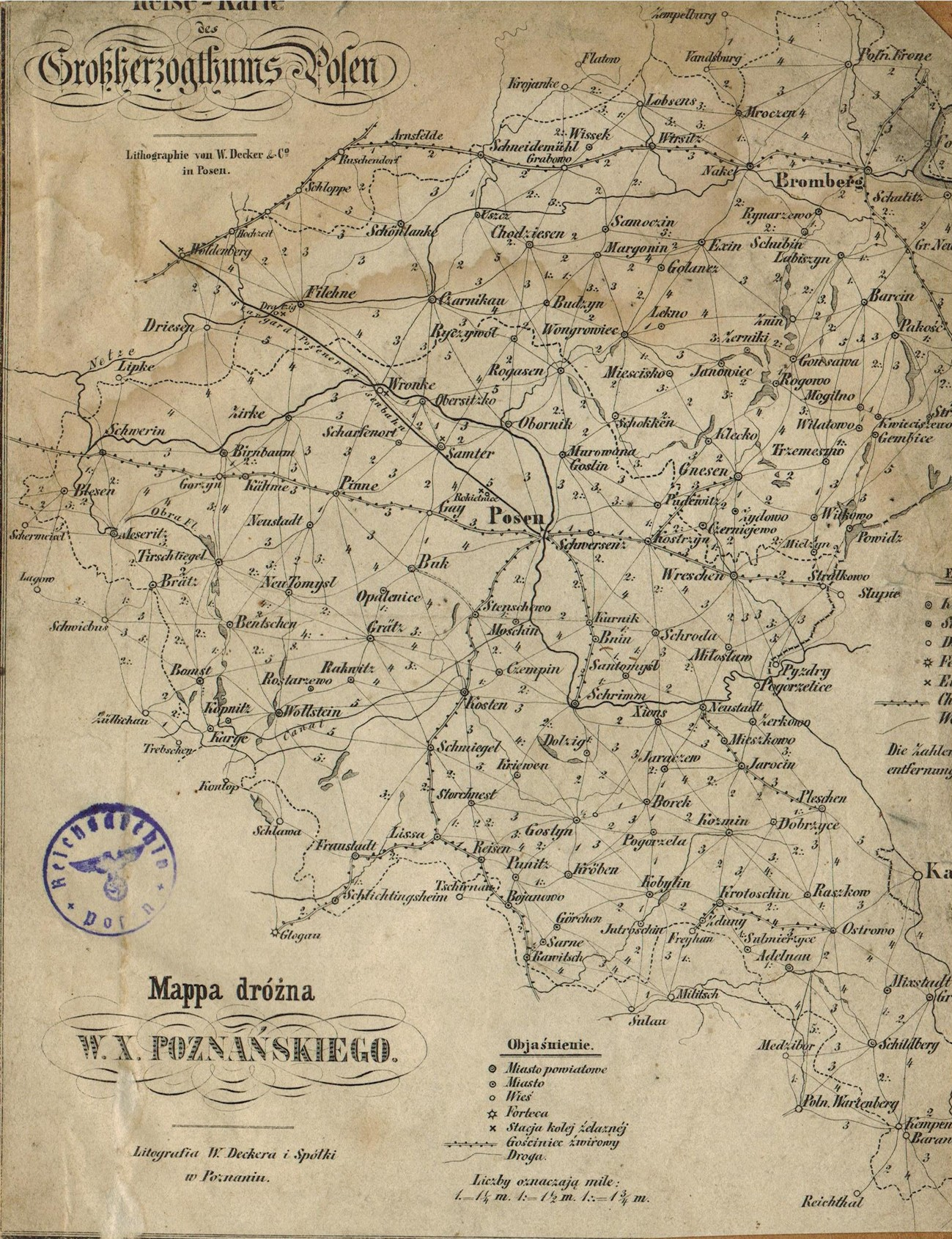
- Map of the Grand Duchy of Posen (place of storage: State Archives in Poznań)
- Capital: Posen (Polish: Poznań)
- Area
  - Coordinates: 52°24′N 16°55′E
  - 1848: 28,951 km^{2} (11,178 sq mi)
- Population
  - 1848: 1,350,000
- Government
  - Type: Absolute monarchy
- Grand Duke
  - 1815–1840: Frederick William III
  - 1840–1848: Frederick William IV
- Governor
  - 1815–1830: Antoni Radziwiłł
  - 1830–1841: Eduard von Flottwell
  - 1841–1848: Adolf von Arnim-Boitzenburg
- Legislature: Sejm
- History
  - Congress of Vienna: 9 June 1815
  - Greater Poland uprising: 19 March 1848
  - Autonomy abolished: 5 December 1848
Preceded by	Succeeded by
Duchy of Warsaw	Province of Posen
- Today part of: Poland

The Grand Duchy of Posen (German: Großherzogtum Posen; Polish: Wielkie Księstwo Poznańskie) was part of the Kingdom of Prussia, created from territories annexed by Prussia after the Partitions of Poland, and formally established following the Congress of Vienna in 1815. On 9 February 1849, the Prussian administration renamed the grand duchy the Province of Posen. Its former name was unofficially used afterwards for denoting the territory, especially by Poles, and today is used by modern historians to refer to different political entities until 1918. Its capital was Posen (Polish: Poznań). The title of Grand Duke of Posen remained until 1918 to the King of Prussia.

== History ==
=== Background ===
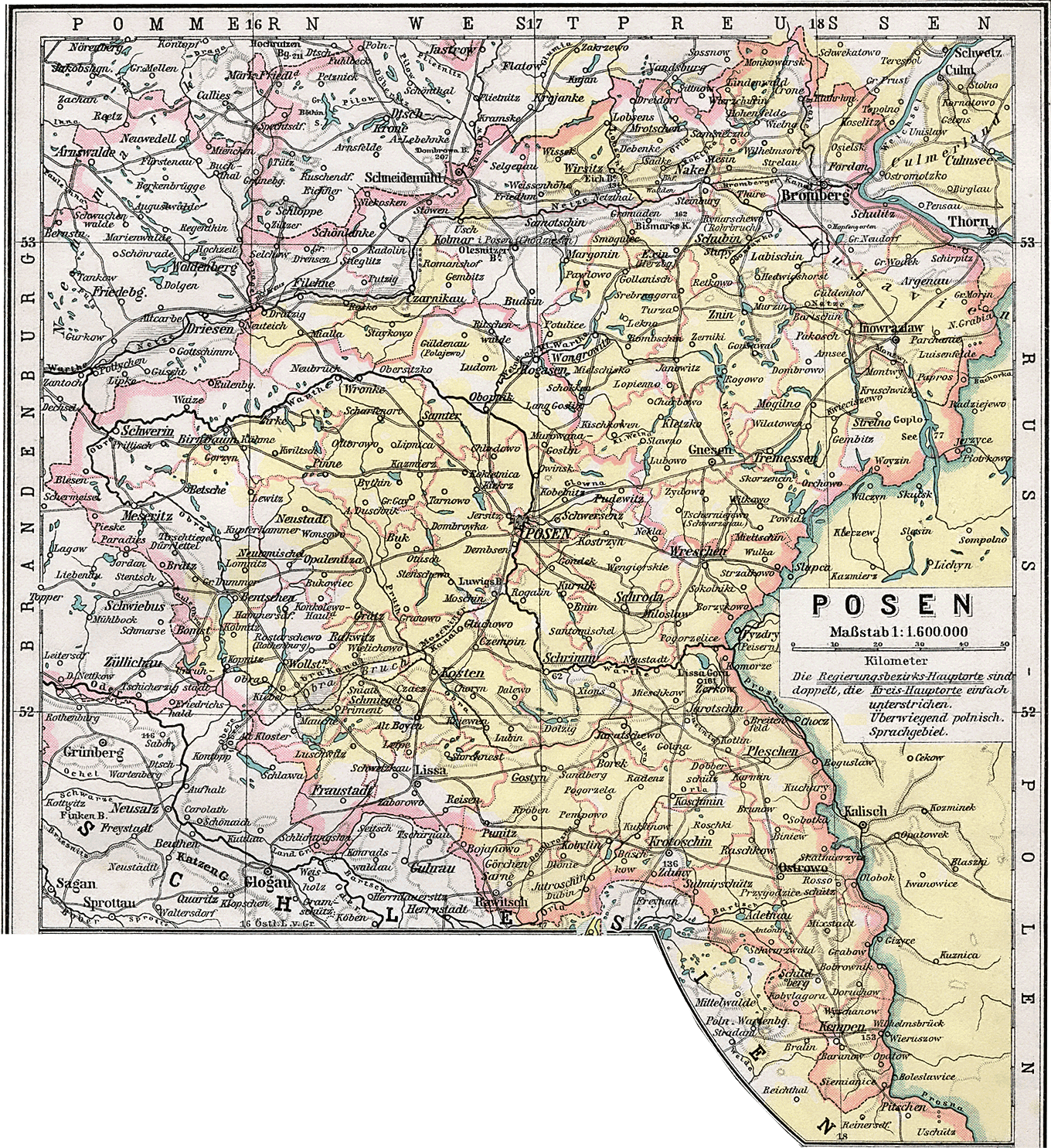
The Prussian Province of Posen. Yellow colour: Polish-speaking areas according to German authorities, as of 1905

Originally part of the Kingdom of Poland, this area largely coincided with Greater Poland. The eastern portions of the territory were taken by the Kingdom of Prussia during the Partitions of Poland; during the first partition (1772), Prussia took just the Netze District, the portion along the Noteć (German: Netze) river. Prussia added the remainder during the second partition in 1793. Prussia briefly lost control during the Kościuszko Uprising in 1794.

It was initially administered as the province of South Prussia. The Poles were the primary ally of Napoleon Bonaparte in Central Europe, participating in the Greater Poland Uprising of 1806 and supplying troops for his campaigns. After the defeat of Prussia by Napoleonic France, the Duchy of Warsaw was created by the Treaty of Tilsit in 1807.

=== 1815–1830 ===
Following the Congress of Vienna, portions of Prussia's Polish territories were ceded to Congress Poland, a kingdom ruled in personal union by the Russian Czar. From the remainder, the Grand Duchy of Posen was created with the city of Posen as the administrative centre and the seat of the Statthalter Prince Antoni Henryk Radziwiłł. In reality, the governing power over the region lay with the provincial upper-president Joseph Zerboni di Sposetti.

At the beginning of the Prussian takeover of Polish territories, the discrimination and repression of Poles consisted of reducing their access to education and the judicial system. Prussian officials identified Germanisation as the progress of higher culture over a lower one. As a result, the local administration discriminated against Poles. After 1824, attempts to Germanise the school system were hastened and the government refused to establish a Polish university in Posen. Polish politicians issued protests against Prussian policies and a secret, patriotic Polish organisation was founded called Towarzystwo Kosynierów (Society of Scythemen). The resistance activity of Poles resulted in a reaction from Berlin, where a trial was held in connection to links between Poles from the Grand Duchy with Poles from Russian-ruled Congress Poland.

=== 1830–1840 ===
The 1830 November Uprising within Congress Poland against the Russian Empire was significantly supported by Poles from the Grand Duchy. Afterward, the Prussian administration under Oberpräsident Eduard Flottwell known for his anti-Polonism introduced a stricter system of repression against the Poles. Prussian authorities attempted to expel Poles from administration to weaken the Polish nobility by buying its lands out, and, after 1832, the role of the Polish language in education was significantly repressed. Local self-government in the landed estates of land-lords, which was dominated by Polish nobility, was abolished, and instead the Prussian state appointed commissioners. Monasteries and their assets were confiscated by Prussia. The office of the governor (Statthalter) was abolished. Germanisation of institutions, education as well, through colonisation was implemented.

=== 1840–1846 ===
On 11 September 1840, an audience was held by the Prussian king for deputies coming from the Grand Duchy. Count Edward Raczyński, in the name of all Polish members of the Grand Duchy Sejm (parliament), issued a complaint against the repression and discrimination of the Polish population, which went against guarantees made in 1815. He accused the Prussian authorities of removing the Polish language from public institutions, courts and schools, as well as deleting the history of Poland from school teaching and substituting the name "Province of Posen" for the previous "Grand Duchy of Posen". He also blamed the authorities for erasing the Polish Eagle from the Grand Duchy's seals and emblems and for expelling Poles from offices in order to replace them with Prussians or foreign-born persons of German ethnicity. When land owners of Polish ethnicity sold land, it was often bought in order to resell it to colonists of German ethnicity. The Prussian king rejected the complaint; he was fully supportive of the Germanisation of Polish areas. However, he believed it had to be done through different methods, and in May 1841 decided to name Flottwell upper-president of the Prussian Province of Saxony, which included large territories annexed from the Kingdom of Saxony in 1815.

=== Greater Poland Uprising of 1846 ===
Before 1848, repressions intensified in the Grand Duchy, censorship was strengthened, and settlers of German ethnicity were brought in. Large patriotic demonstrations were held in memory of Antoni Babiński, a member of the Polish Democratic Society. He had been wounded by a gunshot when the Prussian gendarme, attempting to arrest him, engaged in a fight with him. Babiński was then captured, sentenced to death and executed in Posen. His public execution in February 1847 was accompanied by public mourning. Cloth soaked in his blood and other remains were distributed as national relics. Large prayers were held in his memory, often against the orders of Prussia. Members of such gatherings were persecuted by the police. At the same time, the national self-awareness grew among the rural population of Polish and German ethnicity alike. Whereas two thirds of the grand ducal population identified as ethnically Polish (mostly in the centre, south and east), one third envisioned themselves as being of German ethnicity. Anti-Prussian sentiment grew as a response to the policy of Germanisation and repression by Prussian authorities and the conspiracy organisation called Związek Plebejuszy found a potent ground. It was led by bookseller Walenty Stefański, poet Ryszard Berwiński and lawyer Jakub Krauthofer-Krotowski.

=== Frankfurt Parliament of 1848 and the Duchy ===
During the Revolutions of 1848, the Frankfurt Parliament attempted to divide the grand duchy into two parts: the province of Posen, which would have been annexed into a united Germany, and the province of Gniezno, which would have remained outside Germany, but because of the protest of Polish parliamentarians these plans failed and the integrity of the grand duchy was preserved. However, on February 9, 1849, after a series of broken assurances, the Prussian administration renamed the grand duchy the Province of Posen. Nevertheless, the territory remained outside of the German Confederation until its dissolution and but was incorporated into the North German Confederation upon its foundation. The Prussian kings retained the title of Grand Duke of Posen until the fall of the monarchy in 1918.

== Area and Population ==
Regierungsbezirks of the Grand Duchy of Posen Posen Bromberg

The grand duchy was 28,951 square kilometres (11,178 sq mi) in area and was subdivided into two government districts: Posen and Bromberg. The regions were further divided into 26 original districts (German: Kreis(e), Polish: Powiat(y)) headed by Landräte ("district councillors"). Later, these were redivided into 40 districts, plus two urban districts. In 1824, the Grand Duchy also received a provincial council (term started in 1827), but with little administrative power, limited to providing advice. In 1817, the Culmerland (Chełmno Land) was moved to West Prussia. From the 1820s, the grand duchy had a parliament, the Sejm of the Grand Duchy of Posen. Today, much of the territory lies within the Greater Poland and Kuyavian–Pomeranian voivodeships.

Population:

- 900,000 (1815)
- 1,350,000 (1849)
- 2,100,000 (1910)

Since in the first half of the 19th century there was no census or other statistics also recording the ethnic identities of the inhabitants of the grand duchy its ethnic composition can only be derived from its religious makeup then recorded in the census. By 1815, in the grand duchy, Catholics were by majority Polish-speaking, most Protestants were native speakers of German and many Jews then spoke Yiddish. Based on the religious data, it was estimated that in 1815, ethnic Poles made up about 657,000 persons (or 73% of the overall population), while ethnic Germans were 225,000 (25%) and 18,000 (or 2%) were of the Yiddish culture. In 1819, according to Georg Hassel, ethnic Poles were 77% of the population, ethnic Germans 17.5% and Jews 5.5%.

Whereas in 1812 Jews in Prussia proper had been emancipated and naturalised, the Jews of the grand duchy were excluded from citizens' franchise, but like women and non-propertied classes, mere subjects of the grand duke. Only Christian men, if owning land, were enfranchised as citizens. Whereas Christians had freedom to move from the grand duchy to Prussia proper, the grand duchy's Jews were forbidden to immigrate to Prussia. Prussian policy, however, opened an exception; Germanized Jews were enfranchised as citizens and granted freedom of movement. So most adherents of the Yiddish culture Germanized themselves within a short period. Many traditional or newly established German language educational institutions were attended by local Jews who, equipped with Prussian education and German language skills, often emigrated to Prussia proper with some making their careers. Despite Germanization efforts, the Polish speaking population more than doubled to 1,344,000 and remained the majority, however, its percentage decreased to 64% of the population by 1910. However, there were regional differences, with Polish being the prevalent language in central, eastern and southern Posen, and German speakers constituted majorities in the north and west.

== Religion ==
According to contemporary statistics of 1825, the population consisted of the 65.6% Catholics, 28.1% Protestants and 6.3% Jews. The Catholic congregations formed part of the Ecclesiastical Province of Gnesen-Posen led by the Primate of Poland, a jurisdiction formed in 1821 by merging the Archdiocese of Gniezno and Poznań. The bulk of the Lutheran and Reformed (Calvinist) congregations became part of the Ecclesiastical Province of Posen within the Evangelical Church in Prussia after 1817, with the congregations usually retaining their previous separate confessions. With the persisting resistance of some Lutherans against the administrative Prussian Union of churches, the Evangelical Lutheran Church in Prussia emerged in 1841. It was recognised by the government in 1845, with about 3,000 Old Lutherans in several congregations spread across the area of the grand duchy. Jewish religious life was organised in about 130 congregations spread all over the grand duchy. Since the government tolerated Judaism, but did not recognise it, no Jewish umbrella organisation, comparable to those of the Christian denominations or the former Council of Four Lands, forbidden in 1764, did emerge in the grand duchy. The migration of Posen Jews to Prussia was mostly blocked until 1850, when they were finally naturalised.

== Territorial administration ==
The monarch of the grand duchy, with title of Grand Duke of Posen, was the Hohenzollern king of Prussia and his representative was the Duke-Governor (Statthalter): the first was Prince Antoni Radziwiłł (1815–1831), who was married to Princess Louise of Prussia, the king's cousin. The governor was assigned to give advice in matters of Polish nationality, and had the right to veto the administration decisions; in reality, however, all administrative power was in the hands of the Prussian upper-president of the province.

== Organisations ==
Organisations for items of general interest or province-wide purposes:

- Archdiocese of Poznań-Gniezno, seated in Poznań/Posen, a joint diocese of the Roman Catholic Church from 1821
- Posener Provinzial-Bibelgesellschaft (Posen Provincial Bible society; established in 1817 in Posen/Poznań)
- Ecclesiastical Province of Posen, seated in Poznań/Posen, a regional branch of the Evangelical Church in Prussia established in 1817/1826
- Naturwissenschaftlicher Verein (Natural Scientific Association, established in 1837 in Posen/Poznań)
- Central-Lehrer-Verein für die Provinz Posen (central teachers association; established in 1848 in Posen/Poznań)
- Provinzial-Feuersozietät des Großherzogthums Posen (public fire insurance of the Grand Duchy of Posen; established in 1841 in Posen/Poznań)
- Posener Provinzial-Lehrerverein (Posen provincial teacher association; established in 1872 in Posen/Poznań)
- Provinzialverband Posen (provincial federation of Posen, public-law corporation of self-rule of all districts and independent cities within Posen Province for their common purposes; established in 1875 in Posen/Poznań)
- Landwirtschaftskammer für die Provinz Posen (Chamber of Agriculture for the province of Posen; established in 1875 in Posen/Poznań)
- Historische Gesellschaft für den Netzedistrikt zu Bromberg (Historical Society for the Netze District in Bromberg, established in 1880)
- Pestalozzi-Verein der Provinz Posen (Pestalozzi [paedagogical] association for the province of Posen; established in 1883 in Lissa/Leszno)
- Historische Gesellschaft für die Provinz Posen (Historical Society for the Province of Posen, established in 1885 in Posen/Poznań)
- Posener Provinzialvereins zur Bekämpfung der Tuberkulose als Volkskrankheit (Posen provincial association for fighting tuberculosis as a people's disease; established in 1901 in Posen/Poznań)
- Verband der Landwirtschaftlichen Genossenschaften für die Provinz Posen (Association of the agricultural cooperatives for the province of Posen; established in 1903 in Posen/Poznań)
- Sparkassenverband der Provinz Posen (Association of savings and loan banks in the province of Posen; established in 1906 in Posen/Poznań)

=== Polish organisations ===
- Scientific Help Society for the Youth of the Grand Duchy of Posen (established in 1841, Polish: Towarzystwo Naukowej Pomocy dla Młodzieży Wielkiego Księstwa Poznańskiego) – scholarship for the poor youth
- Poznań Bazar (Bazar Poznański, established 1841)
- Central Economic Society for the Grand Duchy of Poznań (established in 1861, Polish: Centralne Towarzystwo Gospodarcze dla Wielkiego Księstwa Poznańskiego, CTG) – promotion of modern agriculture
- People's Libraries Society (established in 1880, Polish: Towarzystwo Czytelni Ludowych, TLC) promotion of education among the people
- Poznań Society of Friends of Arts and Sciences (established in 1875, Polish: Poznańskie Towarzystwo Przyjaciół Nauk, PTPN) promotion of arts and sciencies

=== German organisations ===
Organisations aiming at promoting German-speaking culture, settlements, or expressively addressing German-speaking audiences:

- Prussian Settlement Commission (Ansiedlungskommision, established in 1886)
- Deutscher Ostmarkenverein (DOV, German Eastern Marches Society; Polish abbreviation: Hakata; established in 1894 in Posen/Poznań)
- Deutsche Gesellschaft für Kunst und Wissenschaft zu Posen (German society for art and sciences, established in 1901 in Posen/Poznań)
- Deutsche Gesellschaft für Kunst und Wissenschaft zu Bromberg (German society for art and sciences, established in 1902 in Bromberg/Bydgosccz)

== Notable people ==
- Hipolit Cegielski (1815–1868), Polish businessman, social and cultural activist
- Dezydery Chłapowski (1788–1879), Polish general, business and political activist
- Bernard Chrzanowski (1861–1944), Polish social and political activist, president of the Union of the Greater Poland Falcons (Związek Sokołów Wielkopolskich)
- August Cieszkowski (1814–1894), Polish philosopher, social and political activist, co-founder of the Polish League (Liga Polska), co-founder and president of the PTPN
- Bolesław Dembiński (1833–1914), Polish composer and organist, activist of the singers' societies
- Franciszek Dobrowolski (1830–1896), Polish theatre director, editor of Dziennika Poznańskiego (Poznań Daily)
- Tytus Działyński (1796–1861), Polish political activist, protector of the arts
- Akiva Eger (1761–1837), foremost leader of European Jewry of his era and Talmudic scholar
- Ewaryst Estkowski (1820–1856), Polish teacher, education activist, editor of Szkoła Polska (Polish School) magazine
- Eduard Flottwell (1786–1865), Prussian politician, over-president of the Grand Duchy of Poznań
- Karl Andreas Wilhelm Freymark (1785–1855), titled bishop, first general superintendent of the Ecclesiastical Province of Posen between 1829 and 1853
- Immanuel Lazarus Fuchs (1833–1902), Prussian mathematician
- Paul von Hindenburg (1847–1934), general and statesman who led the Imperial German Army during World War I and later became President of Germany
- Maksymilian Jackowski (1815–1905), Polish activist, secretary-general of the Central Economic Society (Centralne Towarzystwo Gospodarcze), patron of the agricultural circles
- Kazimierz Jarochowski (1828–1888), Polish historian, publicist of the Dziennik Poznański (Poznań Daily), co-founder of PTPN
- Hermann Kennemann (1815–1910), Prussian politician, co-founder of the German Eastern Marches Society
- Antoni Kraszewski (1797–1870), Polish politician and parliamentarian
- Karol Libelt (1807–1875), Polish philosopher, political and social activist, president of PTPN
- Karol Marcinkowski (1800–1848), Polish physician, social activist, founder of the Poznań Bazar
- Teofil Matecki (1810–1886), Polish physician, social activist, member of PTPN, founder of the Adam Mickiewicz monument of Poznań
- Maciej Mielżyński (1799–1870), political and social activist
- Ludwik Mycielski, Polish politician, president of the National Council (Rada Narodowa) in 1913
- Andrzej Niegolewski (1787–1857), Polish colonel during the Napoleonic Wars, member of parliament, shareholder of the Poznań Bazar
- Władysław Oleszczyński (1808–1866), Polish sculptor, who created a monument of Adam Mickiewicz in Poznań
- Gustaw Potworowski (1800–1860), Polish activist, founder of the Kasyno in Gostyń, activist of the Polish League (Liga Polska)
- Edward Raczyński (1786–1845), Polish conservative politician, protector of arts, founder of the Raczynski Library in Poznań
- Antoni Radziwiłł (1775–1833), Polish duke, composer, and politician, governor-general of the Grand Duchy of Poznań
- Walenty Stefański (1813–1877), Polish bookseller, political activist, co-founder of the Polish League (Liga Polska)
- Florian Stablewski (1841–1906), Catholic priest, archbishop of Poznań and Gniezno, member of the Prussian parliament for the Polish faction
- Heinrich Tiedemann (1840–1922), Prussian politician, co-founder of the German Eastern Marches Society
- Leon Wegner (1824–1873), Polish economist and historian, co-founder of PTPN
- Richard Witting (1812–1912), Prussian politician, lord mayor of Posen city/Poznań, 1891–1902

== See also ==
- Congress Poland
- History of Poland (1795–1918)
- History of Poznań

== Bibliography ==
- Robert Alvis, Religion and the Rise of Nationalism: A Profile of an East-Central European City, Syracuse 2005
- Gazeta Wielkiego Księstwa Poznańskiego
- Konstanty Kościnski, Przewodnik pod Poznaniu i Wielkim Księstwie Poznańskiem, Poznań 1909
- T. Dohnalowa, Z dziejów postępu technicznego w Wielkopolsce w pierwszej połowie XIX wieku, in: S.Kubiak, L.Trzeciakowski (ed.), Rola Wielkopolski w dziejach narodu polskiego
- F. Genzen, Z.Grot, F.Paprocki, Zabór pruski w Powstaniu Styczniowym. Materiały i dokumenty, Wrocław-Warszawa-Kraków 1968
- B. Grześ, Jerzy Kozłowski, A. Kramarski, Niemcy w Poznańskiem wobec polityki germanizacyjnej 1815–1920, Poznań 1976
- Witold Jakóbczyk, Przetrwać nad Wartą 1815–1914. Dzieje narodu i państwa polskiego, vol. III-55, Krajowa Agencja Wydawnicza, Warszawa 1989
- Witold Jakóbczyk (ed.), Studia nad dziejami Wielkopolski w XIX w., vol.I-III, Poznań 1951–1967
- Witold Jakóbczyk (ed.), Wielkopolanie XIX w., Poznań 1969
- Witold Jakóbczyk (ed.), Wielkopolska. Wybór źródeł, t. I 1815–1850, Wrocław 1952
- Witold Jakóbczyk (ed.), Wielkopolska. Wybór źródeł, t. II 1851–1914, Wrocław 1954
- T. Klanowski, Germanizacja gimnazjów w Wielkim Księstwie Poznańskim i opór młodzieży polskiej w latach 1870–1814, Poznań 1962
- Czesław Łuczak, Życie społeczno-gospodarcze w Poznaniu 1815–1918, Poznań 1965
- K. Malinowski (ed.), X wieków Poznania, Poznań-Warszawa 1956
- Witold Molik, Kształtowanie się inteligencji wielkopolskiej w Wielkim Księstwie Poznańskim 1840–1870, Warszawa-Poznań 1979
- F. Paprocki, Wielkie Księstwo Poznańskie w okresie rządów Flottwella (1830–1842), Poznań 1970
- L. Plater, Opisanie historyczno-statystyczne Wielkiego Księstwa Poznańskiego, wyd. J. N. Bobrowicz, Leipzig 1846
- B. Pleśniarski, Poglądy Wielkopolan na sprawy wychowawcze i oświatowe w świetle prasy Księstwa Poznańskiego 1814–1847,
- A. Skałkowski, Bazar Poznański. Zarys stuletnich dziejów (1838–1938), Poznań 1938
- L. Słowiński, Nie damy pogrześć mowy. Wizerunki pedagogów poznańskich XIX wieku, Poznań 1982
- J. Stoiński, Szkolnictwo średnie w Wielkim Księstwie Poznańskim w I połowie XIX wieku (1815–1850), Poznań 1972
- J. Topolski (ed.), Wielkopolska przez wieki, Poznań 1973
- S. Truchim, Geneza szkół realnych w Wielkim Księstwie Poznańskim, Warszawa 1936
- S. Truchim, Historia szkolnictwa i oświaty polskiej w Wielkim Księstwie Poznańskim 1815–1915, Łódź 1967
- Lech Trzeciakowski, Kulturkampf w zaborze pruskim, Poznań 1970
- Lech Trzeciakowski, Pod pruskim zaborem 1850–1914, Warszawa 1973
- Lech Trzeciakowski, Walka o polskość miast Poznańskiego na przełomie XIX i XX wieku, Poznań 1964
- Lech Trzeciakowski, W dziewiętnastowiecznym Poznaniu, Poznań 1987
- Wielkopolski Słownik Biograficzny, 2nd edition, Warszawa-Poznań 1983
