= Sejm of the Grand Duchy of Posen =

Parliament in the 19th century Grand Duchy of Posen and the Province of Posen

Sejm of the Grand Duchy of Posen Sejm Wielkiego Księstwa Poznańskiego

Type
- Type: Unicameral

History
- Founded: 1826
- Disbanded: 1918
- Preceded by: General Sejm
- Succeeded by: Legislative Sejm
- Seats: 48 deputies

The Sejm of the Grand Duchy of Posen (German: Provinziallandtag des Großherzogthums Posen, Polish: Sejm Wielkiego Księstwa Poznańskiego) was the parliament in the 19th century Grand Duchy of Posen and the Province of Posen, seated in Poznań/Posen. It existed from 1823 to 1918. In the history of the Polish parliament, it succeeded the general sejm and local sejmik on part of the territories of the Prussian partition. Originally retaining a Polish character, it acquired a more German character in the second half of the 19th century.

== History ==
The province of Greater Poland was acquired by Kingdom of Prussia following the Congress of Vienna, when it was detached from the Duchy of Warsaw and given to Prussia, where it became reorganized as the Grand Duchy of Posen. The King of Prussia gave the Grand Duchy the right to call a parliament in 1823, with specific decrees defining its competences in 1826. The parliament carried the traditions of the General Sejmik of Greater Poland, and insisted on using the Polish word sejm in its name. The Sejm met for the first time on 24 December 1827. The second sejm session begun on 30 January 1830.

Following the suppression of the Sejm of the Congress Poland in the aftermath of the November Uprising, the Sejm of the Grand Duchy was the last vestige of the Polish parliamentary tradition on Polish soil. Only Christian men owning landed property for at least ten years were enfranchised to vote. Until 1869 Jews generally remained excluded, unlike in Prussia proper.

So immigrants who had newly acquired land were not enfranchised; neither were most of the rural ethnically Polish farmers, who still held land by way of lease or feudal fief only like serfs or vassals of their landlords, unlike Prussia proper where serfdom had been abolished in 1807 and 1810. Immigrant farmers from the Holy Roman Empire (such as the Bambrzy) or later from member states of the German Confederation, had usually remained free peasants, causing their stronger representation within the eight members elected by peasants, of a total of 48. With regard to ethnicity, most of the nobility representatives were Polish, peasantry representatives were balanced, and the townsfolk representatives were mostly German. The first sejm included 22 Poles and 26 Germans, and most of the subsequent elections produced an almost even split between the Poles and the Germans. A major issue of the Sejm was the abolition of serfdom, which would enlarge the number of Polish speaking landowners and after ten years allow their participation in Sejm elections.

The Grand Duchy's population was 65% Polish but with its exclusion of serfs and underrepresentation of landless rural commoners the electoral law was designed to favor the German inhabitants. The proportion of Polish representatives diminished further after the events of 1848, and Jacek Jędruch notes that due to growing discrimination against Polish representatives that date marks the end of the period in which this legislative body can be seen as continuing the Polish parliamentary tradition. Also, while the proceedings of the first sejms were published in Polish, after 1877 they were published in German.

The political factions of the sejm were divided between liberals, supporting the German constitutional movement, and conservatives, like Edward Raczyński, who predicted that this movement would abolish the Grand Duchy's autonomy. During the two or so decades of its existence, the major issues of concern of the Sejm were the abolition of serfdom and relations between the inhabitants of Polish and German ethnicity, particularly the discrimination against the Poles by the Prussian government, which increasingly excluded the Polish majority from administration and judiciary. The last petition issued by the Sejm in 1841 demanded equal rights for the Poles and stopping of the Germanization campaign. As most of the Sejm petitions were simply ignored by the King of Prussia, this contributed to dissent in the province, which eventually resulted in an uprising in 1848 in the midst of the revolutions of 1848 in the German states. The Sejm met the total of seven times before the revolutions of 1848 (in 1827, 1830, 1834, 1837, 1841, 1843 and 1845). Following the revolutions, the Sejm of the Grand Duchy, like other provincial Prussian assemblies, gained the right to elect deputies to the Prussian Parliament. The Sejm continued its sessions till 1918, with a total of 49 Sejms being held.

In the aftermath of World War I, popular protests against the electoral law discriminating against Poles led to new elections in 1918, in which 521 deputies were elected in the Grand Duchy; that Sejm would support the integration of the Grand Duchy territories to the newly formed Second Polish Republic.

== Composition ==
The sejm was unicameral. Only Christian men subject to no other monarch but the king in personal union the grand duke and of at least 30 years of age were enfranchised to vote. For the nobility deputies, initially two, later four deputies held their seats due to privileges tied with other aristocratic status (heads of Grand Duchy magnate families), the rest were elected by landholders.

The sejm had 48 deputies. The representatives were grouped into three benches, with 24 men to represent the landed nobility (nobles not holding a feudal fief manor were excluded, if they owned private land or urban real estate, they would qualify for the election of one of the two other benches), 16 being elected by the cities' burghers, if they owned real estate, and eight by landed free peasants. Similarly, certain levels of wealth were required for election of the peasantry representatives.

Deputies term of office was set for 6 years, with elections for the half of the deputies held every three years. For the first renewal election the to-be-replaced or reelected members had been chosen by lot. The Sejm was to meet every two years, but in reality the gatherings happened less often, between every two and three years. Sessions lasted two months.

=== Marshals of the Sejm ===
One of the noble representatives held the position of the Marshal of the Sejm (speaker; German: Landtags-Marschall). Marshals of the Sejm of the Grand Duchy included Antoni Paweł Sułkowski (the speaker of the first sejm) and Hans Wilhelm von Unruhe-Bomst, marshall as of 1874, further Rudolf Hiller von Gaertringen (1801–1866), Stephan von Dziembowski-Bomst, Józef Ignacy Grabowski Goetzendorf, Stanisław Poniński.

=== Notable members ===
Notable politicians of the Sejm of the Grand Duchy included:

- Lewin Louis Aronsohn
- Theodor von Bethmann-Hollweg
- Walther Buresch
- Julian von Chelmicki
- Dezydery Chłapowski
- Stanisław Chłapowski
- Tytus Działyński
- Dagobert Friedlaender
- Józef I. Grabowski
- Heinrich von Heydebrand und der Lasa
- Stanisław Kurnatowski
- Mieczysław Kwilecki
- Wojciech Lipski
- Maciej Mielżyński
- Franciczek von Morawski
- Andrzej Niegolewski
- Władysław M. Niegolewski
- Gustaw Potworowski
- Heinrich von Pückler
- Edward Raczyński
- Bogusław Fryderyk Radziwiłł
- Emil Ritter
- Julius Ritter
- Karl Schmidt
- Antoni Paweł Sułkowski, Sejm Marshall as of 1824
- Hippolyt von Turno
- Hans Wilhelm von Unruhe-Bomst, Sejm Marshall as of 1874

== Competences ==
The Sejm had mostly advisory powers, although it could legislate on some strictly local matters, such as communal self-government and spending of some local taxes. It could opine legal acts relevant to the Grand Duchy. Its deputies had the right to file petitions and complaints to the King of Prussia, who could consent or reject (as was often the case) the Sejm proposals. Proposals from and to the King required a two-thirds majority; other proposals required a simple majority.

== See also ==
- Landtag
- Polish Party
