= Polish National Committee (1848) =

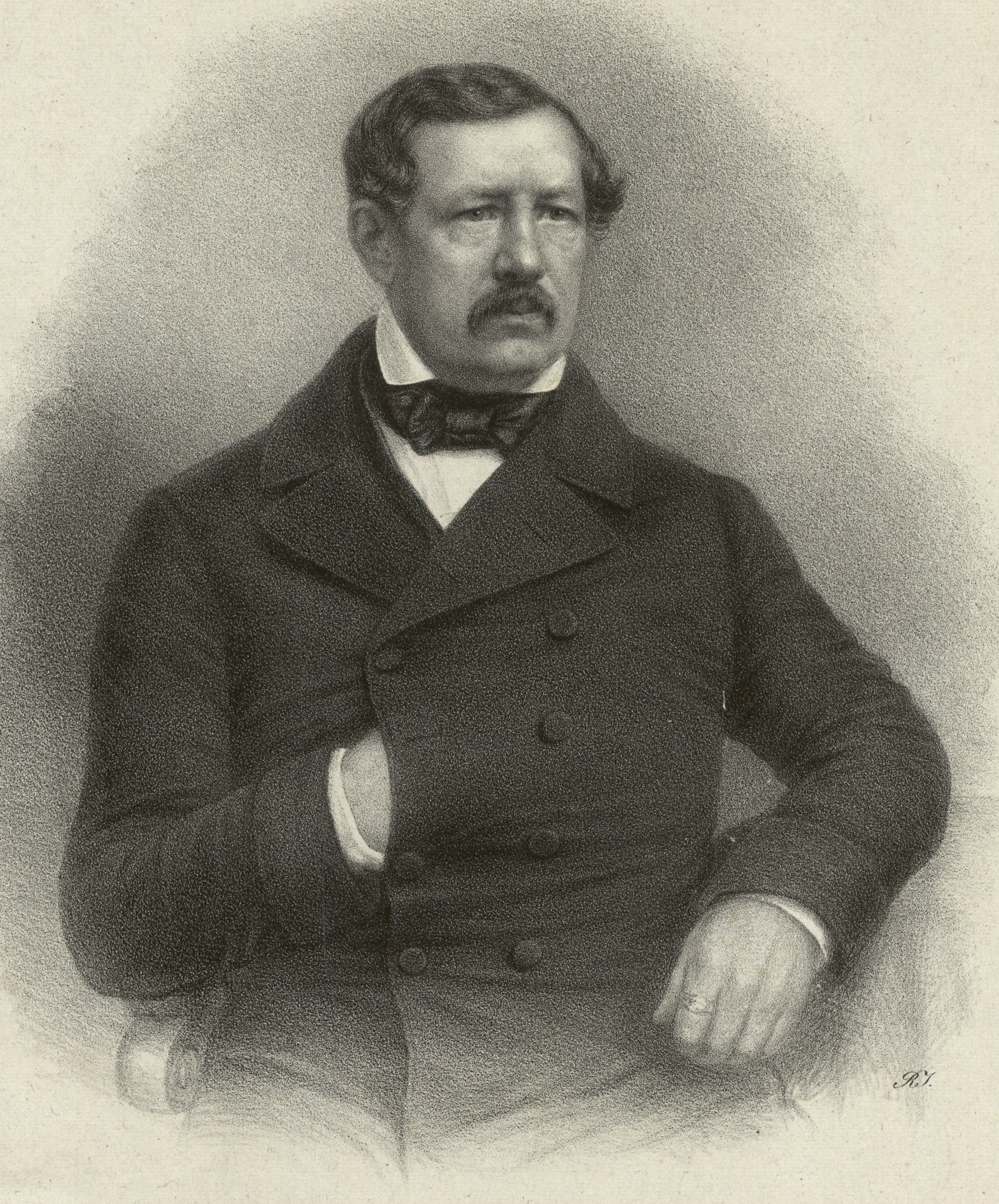
Gustaw Potworowski

Polish National Committee (Polish: Komitet Narodowy Polski) was as organisation created during the Greater Poland Uprising of 1848. It was organized on March 20, 1848, at the Hotel Bazar in Poznań.

During the uprising, the Polish people mounted a military insurrection in the Grand Duchy of Poznań (or the Greater Poland region) against the occupying Prussian forces. The committee was to serve as a legal organization representing Polish interests in negotiations with the Kingdom of Prussia.

The chairman of the committee was Gustaw Potworowski, and the other members included:

- Maciej Mielżyński
- Cyprian Jarochowski
- Jędrzej Moraczewski
- Walenty Stefański
- Ryszard Berwiński
- Jakub Krauthofer
- Paweł Andrzejewski
- Jan Palacz
- Józef Chosłowski
- Władysław Niegolewski
- Pantaleon Szuman
- Włodzimierz Wolniewicz
- Antoni Kraszewski
- doctor Teofil Matecki
- pastor Jan Wilhelm Kassyusz
- Karol Libelt
- Józef Esman
- Michał Słomczewski
- prince Jan Janiszewski
- prince Antoni Fromholz
- Aleksy Prusinowski
