= Stefański =

Stefański (feminine: Stefańska, plural: Stefańscy) is a Polish-language surname. It may be derived either from the place name Stefany or from the given name Stefan (Stephen). The name was recorded in Poland at least since 1775.

Notable people with the surname include:

- Alexander Danieliuk-Stefanski (1897–1937), Polish communist
- Benjamin Stefanski (born 1987), British DJ
- Bud Stefanski (born 1955), Canadian ice hockey player
- Ed Stefanski, American sports executive
- Daniel Stefański (born 1977), Polish football referee
- Halina Czerny-Stefańska (1922–2001), Polish pianist
- John Stefanski (born 1984), American attorney and politician serving as a member of the Louisiana House of Representatives
- Józef Stefański (1908–1997), Polish olympic cyclist
- Kevin Stefanski (born 1982), American football coach
- Larry Stefanki (born 1957), American tennis player and coach
- Mike Stefanski (born 1969), American baseball player
- Patryk Stefański (born 1990), Polish footballer
- Stanisław Stefański (born 1947), Polish olympic sailor
- Walenty Stefański (1813–1877), Polish publisher and political activist
- Włodzimierz Stefański (born 1949), Polish volleyball player
