= Ryszard Wincenty Berwiński =

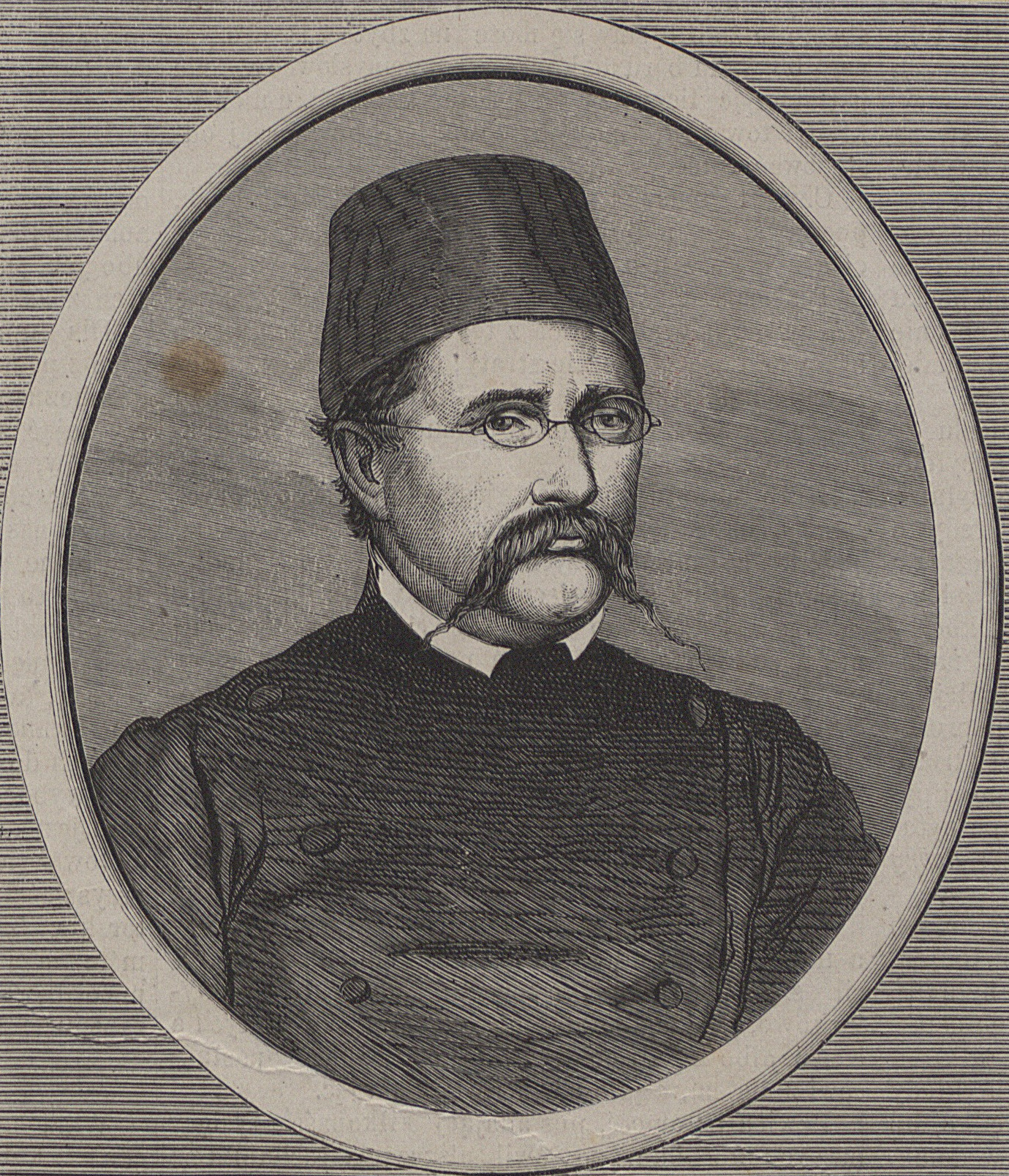
Ryszard Berwiński

Ryszard Wincenty Berwiński (28 February 1817 in Polwica, Poznań, Prussia – 19 November 1879 in Istanbul, then part of the Ottoman Empire) was a Polish poet, translator, folklorist, and nationalist.

Between 1852 and 1854, he was a delegate in the Prussian parliament, before joining a Polish-Turkish military expedition in 1855. He was also a member of the Polish National Committee.

Under the assumed name Wekil Jazbary, he completed his military service in 1871.

== Works ==
- O dwunastu rozbójnikach, 1838
- Bogunka na Gople, 1840
- Don Juan Poznański, 1842 (parody of Don Juan by George Byron)
