= Nowa Sucha, Węgrów County =

Nowa Sucha
- Village
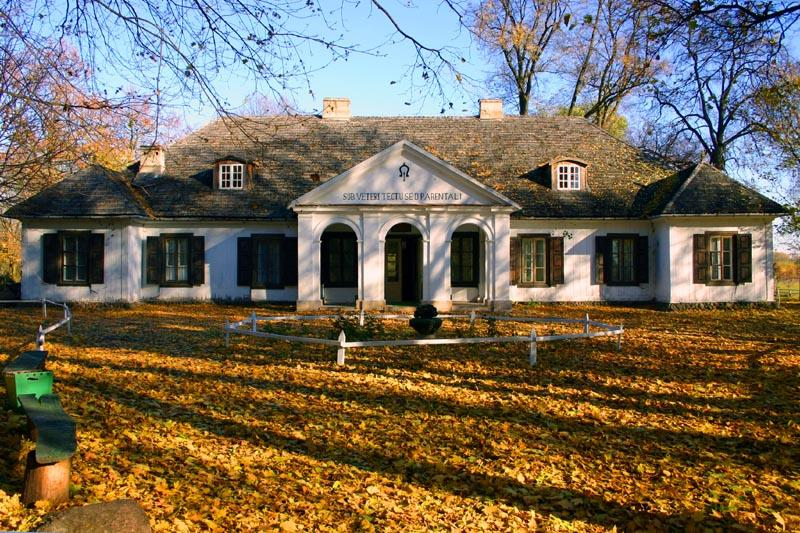
- Manor in Nowa Sucha

- Location within Poland
- Coordinates: 52°15′15″N 21°59′59″E
- Country: Poland
- Voivodeship: Masovian
- County: Węgrów
- Gmina: Grębków
- Population: 92
- Time zone: UTC+1 (CET)
  - Summer (DST): UTC+2 (CEST)
- Postal code: 07-110
- Area code: +48 25
- ISO 3166 code: POL
- Vehicle registration: WWE

Nowa Sucha [ˈnɔva ˈsuxa] is a village in the administrative district of Gmina Grębków, within Węgrów County, Masovian Voivodeship, in east-central Poland.

== Notable people ==
- August Cieszkowski (born 1814), a philosopher, economist, and social and political activist

== History ==
The first mention of the village dates back to 1425. From the 16th century, the property of the Suski family, Jasieńczyk coat of arms. From the second half of the 17th century to 1944, the estate was owned by the Cieszkowski family, Dołęga coat of arms. In 1787, King Stanisław August Poniatowski visited the village.

In 1945-1988 there was a state agricultural farm in the village. Since 1993, the Museum of Wooden Architecture of the Siedlce Region has been operating in Sucha, founded on the initiative of Professor Marek Kwiatkowski.
