= Stanisław Kurnatowski =

Polish nobleman and politician

- Bust of Stanisław Kurnatowski by Władysław Marcinkowski

Marshal of the Sejm of the Grand Duchy of Posen
- In office 1852–1878

Member of the Sejm of the Grand Duchy of Posen
- In office 1852–1878

Member of the Reichstag from Bromberg
- In office 1878–1884

Personal details
- Born: 1823
- Died: 1912 (aged 88–89)
- Party: Polish Party
- Education: University of Hohenheim
- Coat of arms: Łodzia
- Noble family: Kurnatowski

Stanisław Kurnatowski (1823-1912) was a Polish nobleman, landed gentry, and a member of the Sejm of the Grand Duchy of Posen and the Reichstag. He was active in the Polish Party. The Kurnatowski family were owners of the Pożarowo district from the 14th century.
