= Kazimierz Jarochowski =

Polish historian and publicist

Kazimierz Jarochowski (12 September 1829 in Sokolniki, Powiat Szamotulski; 24 March 1888) was a Polish historian, publicist of the Dziennik Poznański (Poznań Daily), co-founder of PTPN.
