= Konstancja Potocka =

Polish noblewoman, translator and illustrator (1781-1852)

- Countess
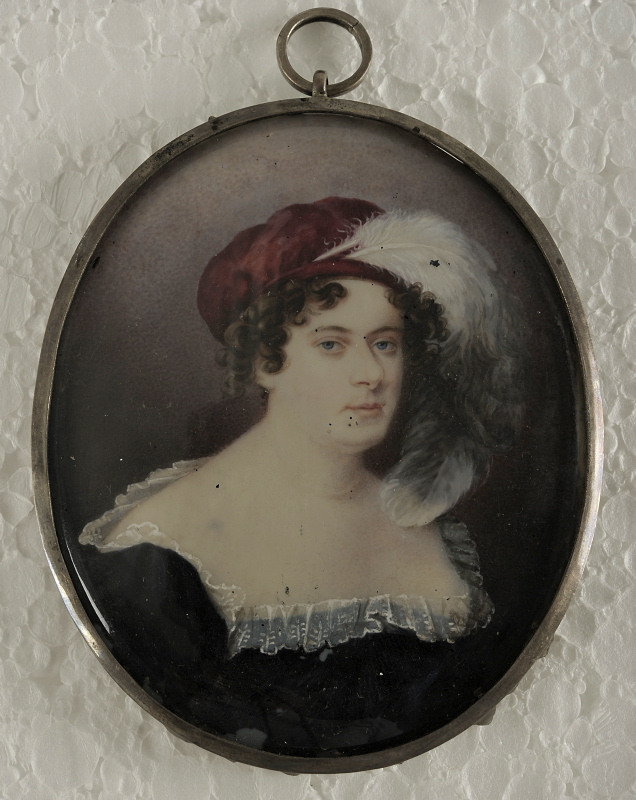
- Coat of arms: Piława
- Born: 1781; Tulchyn, now Ukraine
- Died: December 25, 1852; Solone near Marseille, France
- Family: Potocki
- Consort: Jan Potocki; Edward Raczyński
- Issue: with Jan Potocki; Bernard Potocki; Irena Potocka; Teresa Potocka with Edward Raczyński; Roger Maurycy Raczyński
- Father: Stanisław Szczęsny Potocki
- Mother: Józefina Amalia Mniszech

Countess Konstancja Potocka (1781 – December 25, 1852) was a Polish noblewoman, translator and illustrator.

She was the daughter of Stanisław Szczęsny Potocki. She married Jan Potocki in 1799, and Edward Raczyński in 1817. During her second marriage, she was a known figure in Polish literary life. She co- founded the Raczyński library in Poznań (1829), and translated, illustrated and published German works.
