= Karl Ludwig Michelet =

German philosopher (1801–1893)

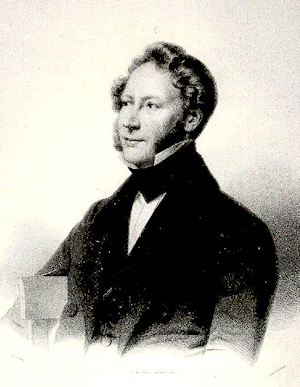
- Born: 4 December 1801; Berlin, Prussia
- Died: 15 December 1893 (aged 92); Berlin, German Empire
- Spouses: Marie Scholz (m. 1832; died 1864); Jenny Vallon (m. 1867; died 1886)
- Children: 6

Education
- Education: University of Berlin (PhD, 1824)
- Thesis: De doli et culpae in iure criminali notionibus (1824)
- Doctoral advisor: G. W. F. Hegel

Philosophical work
- Era: 19th-century philosophy
- Region: Western philosophy
- School: German idealism Hegelianism
- Institutions: University of Berlin
- Notable students: August Cieszkowski; David Friedrich Strauss
- Main interests: Metaphysics

Karl Ludwig Michelet (German: [ˈkaʁl ˈluːtvɪç miˈʃlɛ]; 4 December 1801 – 15 December 1893) was a German philosopher and proponent of Hegelianism.

== Biography ==
Michelet studied at the grammar school and at the University of Berlin in his native town, took his degree as doctor of philosophy in 1824 (with a thesis supervised by Georg Wilhelm Friedrich Hegel), and became professor in 1829, a post which he retained till his death.

== Work ==
Educated in the doctrine of Hegel, he remained faithful to his early teaching and spent his life defending and continuing the Hegelian tradition. His first notable work was the System der philosophischen Moral (Berlin, 1828), which develops the principles contained in his inaugural dissertation. It is an examination of the ethical theory of responsibility. In 1836 he published, in Paris, a treatise on the Metaphysics of Aristotle, written in French (Examen critique du livre d'Aristote intitulé Metaphysique) and crowned by the Académie des Sciences Morales et Politiques. He wrote also two other treatises on Aristotle: Nikomachische Ethik (2nd ed., 1848) and Die Ethik des Aristoteles in ihrem Verhältniss zum System der Moral (1827).

Michelet's own views are best expressed in his Vorlesungen über die Persönlichkeit Gottes und die Unsterblichkeit der Seele, oder die ewige Persönlichkeit des Geistes (1841) and Die Epiphanie der ewigen Persönlichkeit des Gottes (1844–52). The philosophical theology developed in these works has been described as a "Neo-Christian Spiritualism."

From 1832 to 1842 Michelet was engaged as one of the editors of Hegel's complete works, and he sought to illustrate Hegel's system in three works: Geschichte der letzten Systeme der Philosophie in Deutschland von Kant bis Hegel (2 vols., Berlin, 1837–1838), Entwickelungsgeschichte der neuesten Deutschen Philosophie mit besonderer Rücksicht auf den gegenwärtigen Kampf Schelling's mit der Hegelschen Schule (1843), and the controversial dissertation Schelling und Hegel (1839). In Anthropologie und Psychologie (1840), Michelet diverges in many respects from Hegelian principles.

Other works include: Eine italienische Reise in Briefen (Berlin, 1856), Die Geschichte der Menschheit in ihrem Entwickelungsgange seit dem Jahre 1775 bis auf die neuesten Zeiten (2 vols., 1859–60), Naturrecht, oder Rechtsphilosophie als die praktische Philosophie (3 vols., 1866), Esquisse de logique (Paris, 1856), Hegel der unwiderlegte Weltphilosoph (1870), Wahrheit aus meinem Leben (1886).

In 1845 Michelet founded the Berlin Philosophical Society, which has continuously represented the Hegelianism of Germany. He was the first editor of Der Gedanke (1860), the official organ of the society.
