= Franciszek Dobrowolski =

Polish theatre director and editor

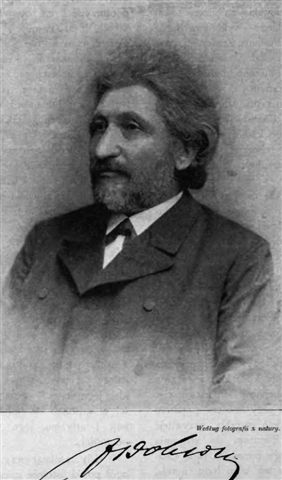

Dictator of the Polish National Government
- In office May 23, 1863 – June 9, 1863
- Preceded by: Agaton Giller
- Succeeded by: Piotr Kobylański
- In office September 17, 1863 – October 17, 1863
- Preceded by: Karol Majewski
- Succeeded by: Romuald Traugutt

Personal details
- Born: July 20, 1830 Suchympn n. Płock; Congress Poland, Russian Empire
- Died: July 11, 1896 (aged 65) Poznań, Grand Duchy of Posen, Germany

Franciszek Dobrowolski (Polish pronunciation: [fraɲˈt͡ɕiʂɛɡ dɔbrɔˈvɔlskʲi]; 1830–1896) was a Polish theatre director, editor of Dziennik Poznański (Poznań Daily) and a social and political activist who participated in the Polish National Government during the January Uprising.

Briefly interned in 1864, Dobrowolski left Poland for Germany eventually settling in Poznań where he worked as an editor for Dziennik Poznański and as director of the Polish Theatre in Poznań.
