= Antoni Kraszewski =

Polish politician and parliamentarian

Antoni Kraszewski (1797-1870) was a Polish politician and parliamentarian. He was a member of the Polish National Committee (1848).
