= Edward Raczyński (1786–1845) =

Polish politician (1786–1845)

- Count
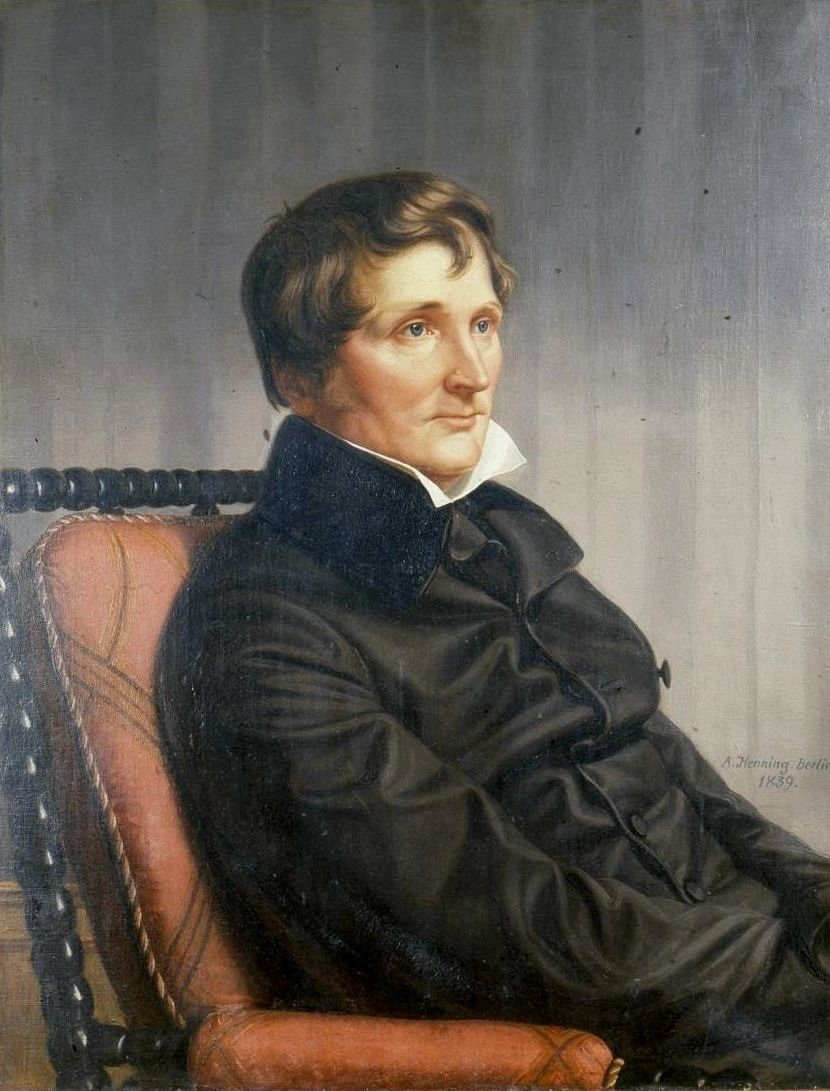
- Coat of arms: Nałęcz
- Born: 2 April 1786; Poznań
- Died: 20 January 1845 (aged 58); Zaniemyśl
- Family: Raczyński
- Consorts: Konstancja Potocka
- Issue: Roger Maurycy Raczyński
- Mother: Maria Ernesta Gotschall

Count Edward Raczyński, of the Nałęcz coat-of-arms (April 2, 1786 in Poznań – January 20, 1845 in Zaniemyśl) was a Polish conservative politician, protector of arts, founder of the Raczyński Library and the first aqueduct in Poznań, and orientalist who contributed also to nature conservation in Rogalin (Oaks of Rogalin).

Raczyński was the leading Polish orientalist (the term used in Europe at the time to describe scholars specializing in the Orient, i.e the Middle East) of his time. In 1823, his book Dziennik podróży do Turcyi odbytey w 1814 was published, recounting a journey he made to the Ottoman empire in 1814. The Polish scholar Bogusław R. Zagórski wrote in the 19th century owing to the way that Poland had been partitioned between Prussia, Russia and Austria leading to much unhappiness amongst the Poles that there was an obsession for the Polish public with the world beyond Poland as places where happiness was possible. As such, Polish publishers in the 19th century frequently printed books recounting adventures and travels by Poles in the far-away lands in Africa, Asia, Australia and the Americas as places where it was possible to find happiness in way that did not exist in the lands that ruled by the Russian, Austrian and German empires, and that Raczyński's studies in Orientalism were part of this trend.

He married Konstancja Potocka in 1817.

== Books ==
- Witold Jakóbczyk, Przetrwać nad Wartą 1815–1914, Dzieje narodu i państwa polskiego, vol. III-55, Krajowa Agencja Wydawnicza, Warszawa 1989
- Zagórski, Bogusław (2017). "Polish Connections to the Hajj between Mystical Experience, Imaginary Travelogues, and Actual Reality". In Umar Ryad (ed.). The Hajj and Europe in the Age of Empire. Leiden: Brill. pp. 155–184.

== See also ==
- Edward Raczyński (1891–1993) was a Polish aristocrat, diplomat, politician and the President of Poland in exile (between 1979 and 1986).
