= Leon Wegner =

Polish economist and historian

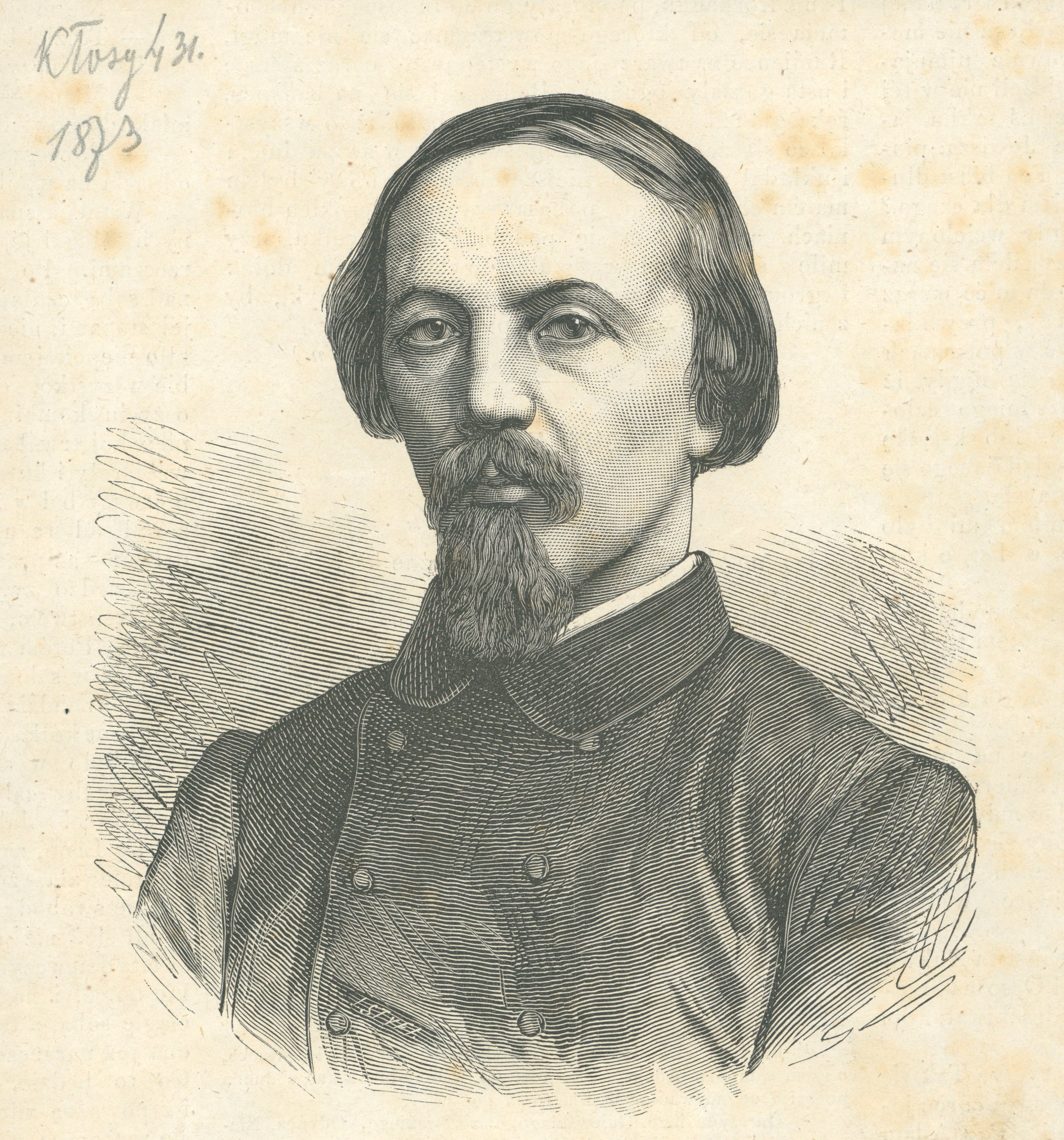
Wegner in 1874

Leon Wegner (31 March 1824, Poznań – 9 July 1873, Poznań) was a Polish economist and historian, co-founder of Poznań Society of Friends of Arts and Sciences.
