= August Cieszkowski =

Polish philosopher of history (1814 – 1894)

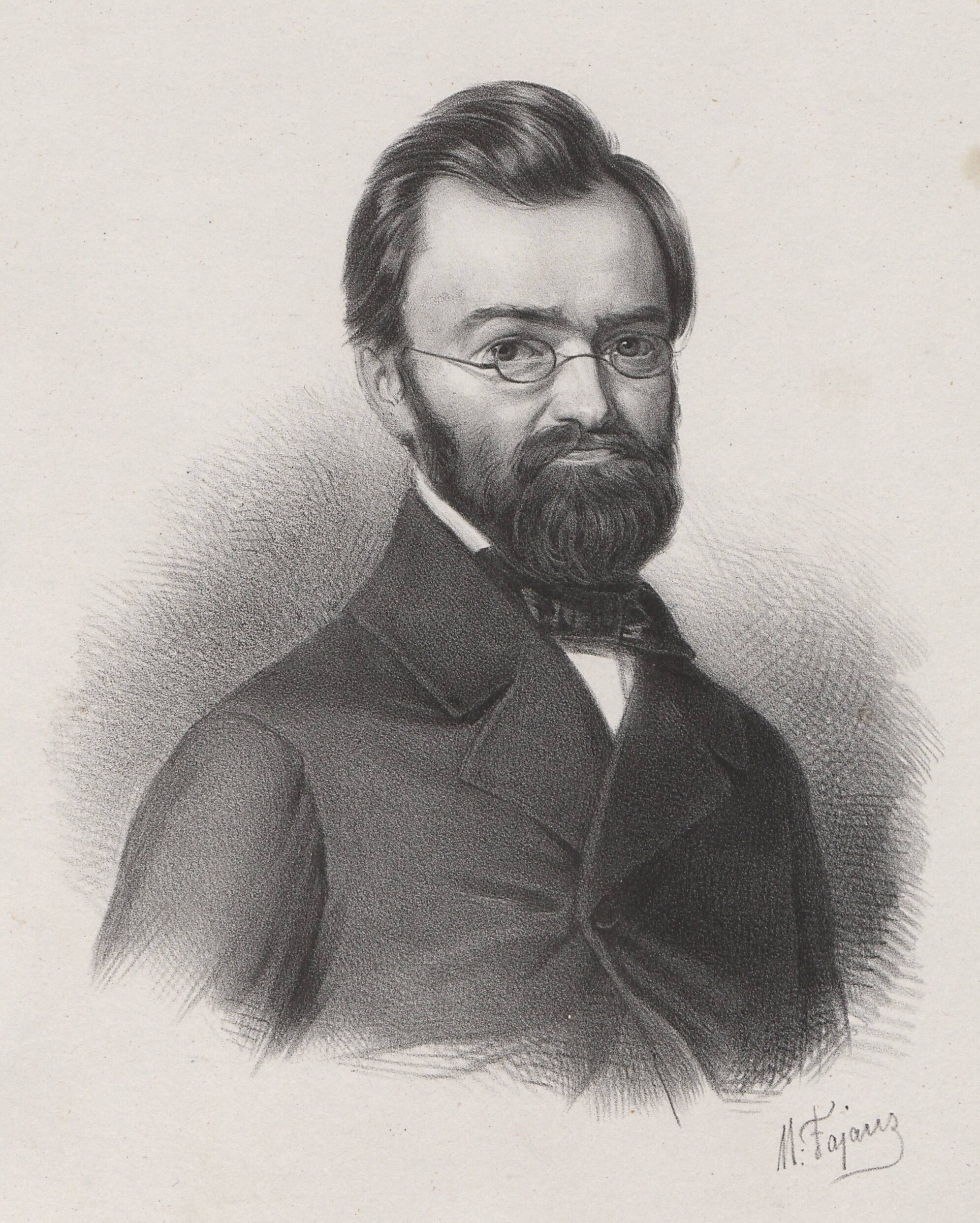
- Born: August Dołęga Cieszkowski; 12 September 1814; Nowa Sucha, Duchy of Warsaw
- Died: 12 March 1894 (aged 79); Oberbrunn, Congress Poland

Education
- Education: Jagiellonian University; University of Berlin; Heidelberg University
- Academic advisor: Karl Ludwig Michelet

Philosophical work
- Era: Modern philosophy: 19th-century philosophy
- Region: Western philosophy: Polish philosophy
- School: Young Hegelians; Polish messianism
- Main interests: Philosophy of history, philosophy of action
- Notable works: Prolegomena to a Historiosophy (1838)
- Notable ideas: Historiosophy; Praxis

Count August Dołęga Cieszkowski (/tʃɛsˈkɒfski/; Polish: [t͡ɕɛʂˈkɔfskʲi]; 12 September 1814 – 12 March 1894) was a Polish philosopher, economist and social and political activist. His Hegelian philosophy influenced the young Karl Marx and action theorists.

== Biography ==
Cieszkowski was born in Nowa Sucha, in the Duchy of Warsaw. He studied at the Jagiellonian University and in then, from 1832, at the University of Berlin where he became interested in Hegelianism through the lectures of Karl Ludwig Michelet, who became a lifelong friend. He gained his doctorate in philosophy from Heidelberg University in 1838. After his studies he travelled around Europe, visiting France, England and Italy before returning to Poland in 1840 and settling permanently in Wierzenica, near Poznań, in 1843.

Cieszkowski co-founded the Polish League (Liga Polska) in 1848. He was a member of the Prussian National Assembly (1848–1855) and a political activist. He (unsuccessfully) endeavoured to start a university in Poznań and co-founded the Poznań Society of Friends of Arts and Sciences (PTPN) in 1857, being elected to its presidency three times (1857–1858, 1861–1868, 1885). It was the most important cultural and scientific society in Poland until the creation of Kraków's Academy of Learning (Akademia Umiejętności) in 1871–73. In 1870 he founded the Halina School of Agriculture in Żabikowo, named after his wife Halina, who had died in 1861. In 1873 it became affiliated to the Kraków Academy of Learning, established in 1872.

== Philosophical work ==
Cieszkowski coined the term "historiosophy" in his 1838 work Prolegomena zur Historiosophie (Prolegomena to a Historiosophy), a revision of the Hegelian philosophy of history. He adopted a threefold division of human history from medieval millenarians such as Joachim of Fiore (c. 1135–1202) and mixed it with Hegelian categories and concepts. He is arguably the creator of the "philosophy of action".

- Cieszkowki's first period of history was that of antiquity.
- The second period was the Christian era, which represented the birth of reflectiveness, a turning inwards and upwards from natural sensual immediacy toward the universal and abstract. The spirit existed "for itself" (für sich). This period was marked by an intolerable duality between the opposed worlds of the God and temporal existence, spirit and matter, action and thought. The Hegelian philosophy of spirit, thought and universality at the expense of will, matter and particularly the (Hegelian) spirit had not yet experienced the division of mind and body and living in a primal pre-reflective unity with nature, mainly expressing itself through art. The spirit was "in itself" (an sich) in Hegelian jargon. The existence represented the apotheosis and supreme manifestation of this period of history.
- The third period of history was the "post-Hegelian" era in which the dualisms of the last were overcome and superseded. The one-sided emphasis on thought in the Christian era would be overcome and the spirit would assimilate nature to itself as well. Thus philosophy would come to an end as the synthesising and self-actualising activity of the spirit now took the form of creative practical activity. This final stage of the development of spirit represents the ultimate synthesis of opposites: God and world, necessity and freedom, desire and duty, Heaven and Earth are all as one.

Cieszkowski's later works, Gott und Paligenesie (God and Palingenesis) (1842) and Ojcze Nasz (Our Father, 1848–1906, four volumes), reformulate his triad in much more explicitly religious terms. The three eras are expressed as those of God the Father, the Son and the Holy Spirit. He stresses the role of the Catholic Church and accords a significant world-transforming role to the Slavs (a common theme in the Messianistic philosophy current in Poland at the time) in the process through which the Holy Spirit would emerge.

Cieszkowski's belief in a personal God, it has been argued, disqualifies him as one of the Left Hegelians, differentiated from Hegel's more orthodox followers by their generally critical attitude to religion and Christianity. The Left certainly did not count him as one of their own, even though some of its members soon took up the idea of the unity of philosophy of action. On the other hand, Cieszkowski did incorporate an elaborate system of social reforms into his philosophy and was strongly influenced by the French socialist tradition, which was often overtly religious, and thus did not share the characteristic political conservatism of the "Right Hegelians".

== Legacy ==
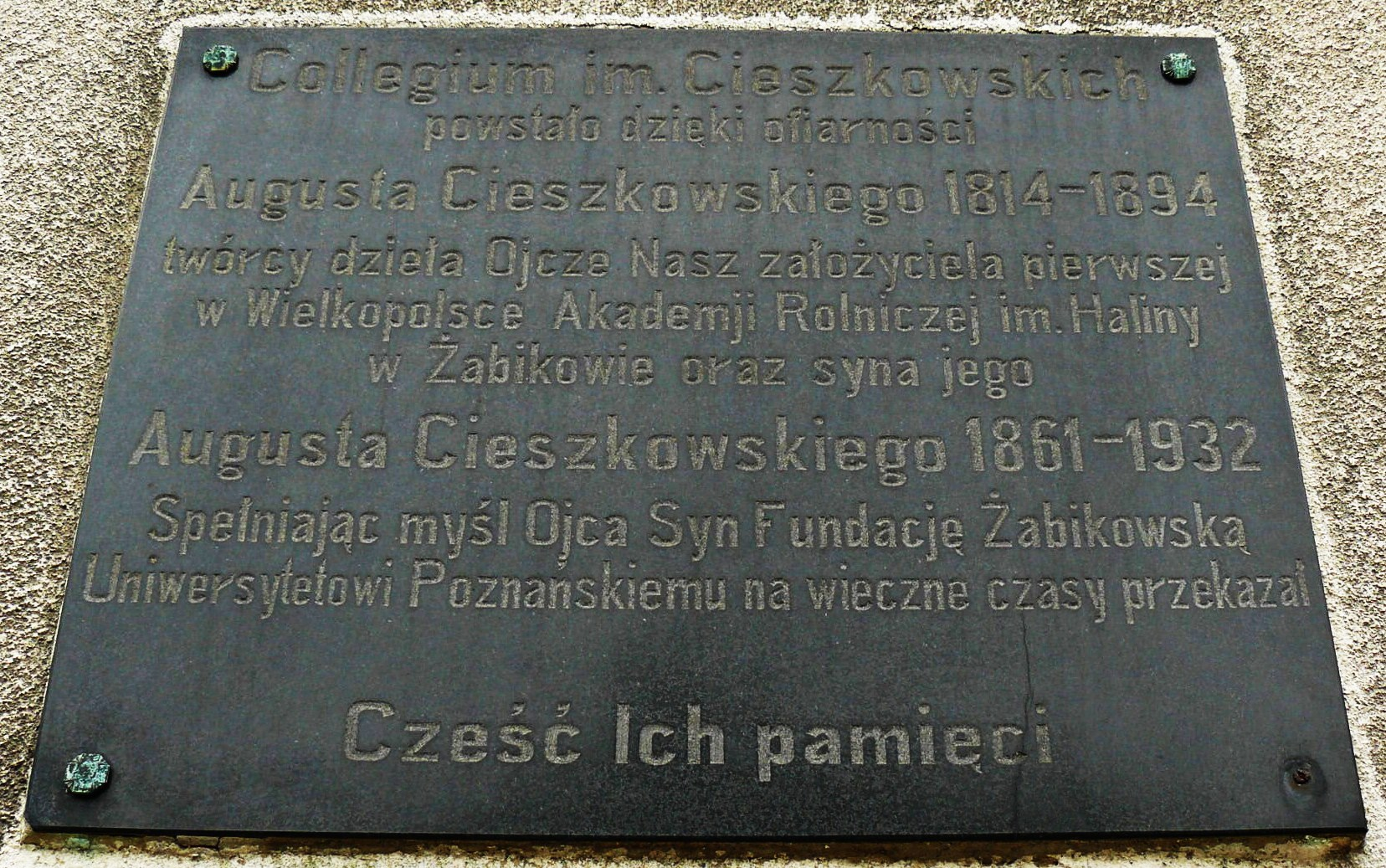
Commemoration plaque, Poznań.

Cieszkowski exerted a significant (and reciprocated) influence on Polish Romantic poet, playwright and Gothic novelist Zygmunt Krasiński, whom he met in Milan in 1839 and became close friends with (Józef Kallenbach published (in Polish) two volumes of their correspondence in 1912). He also influenced the poet Cyprian Norwid, philosopher Bronisław Trentowski and philosopher, art historian and proto-psychologist Józef Kremer. He is arguably the creator of the "philosophy of action." His most important philosophical legacy is probably his influence on the young Karl Marx, via German communist and Young Hegelian Moses Hess. The latter adopted Cieszkowski's idea that the dualism between consciousness and action would collapse in the latter part of the history of humanity, though he believed the synthesis had occurred on various occasions throughout history and located the transition to the 'third age' at the Reformation instead of the philosophy of Hegel. Scholars David McLellan and Shlomo Avineri argue that Marx, who was a friend of and collaborator with Hess from a few years from 1841 onwards, owes various aspects of his thought on alienation and the nature of and transition to communist society to Cieszkowski, including that the dualism between consciousness and action would collapse in revolutionary praxis. (Cieszkowski was one of the earliest philosophers to use the term praxis as meaning "action oriented towards changing society" in his Prolegomena zur Historiosophie).

The University of Life Sciences in Poznań was named the August Cieszkowski Agricultural University of Poznań from 1996 until 11 April 2008, when it gained official university status, in recognition of Cieszkowski's contributions to agricultural science and education in the region.

== Works ==
- Prolegomena zur Historiosophie (Prolegomena to a Historiosophy) (1838)
- Gott und Palingenesie (God and Palingenesis) (1842)
- Ojcze Nasz (Our Father) (1848)

== See also ==
- History of philosophy in Poland
- List of Poles
