= Poznań Society of Friends of Learning =

Polish scientific society

The Poznań Society for the Advancement of Arts and Sciences
- Abbreviation: PTPN (Poznańskie Towarzystwo Przyjaciół Nauk)
- Formation: 1857; 169 years ago
- Type: NGO
- Purpose: To facilitate the advancement of arts and sciences
- Headquarters: Poznań, Poland
- Region served: western Poland
- Website: ptpn.poznan.pl

The Poznań Society for the Advancement of Arts and Sciences (Polish: Poznańskie Towarzystwo Przyjaciół Nauk, PTPN) is a learned society in Poznań, Poland, established in 1857, by scholars and scientists in all branches of learning. It has been one of the largest and most important general learned organizations in Poland.

When founded in the 19th century, the Poznań Society was the chief Polish scientific and cultural organization in Prussian Poland, and until the creation of Kraków's Academy of Learning (Akademia Umiejętności) in 1871–73 it was the most important learned society in all the Polish lands. In addition to its learned activities, the Society collected and secured art works and Polish national mementos.

In 1919 the Society initiated the founding of University of Poznań (currently Adam Mickiewicz University).

== Presidents ==
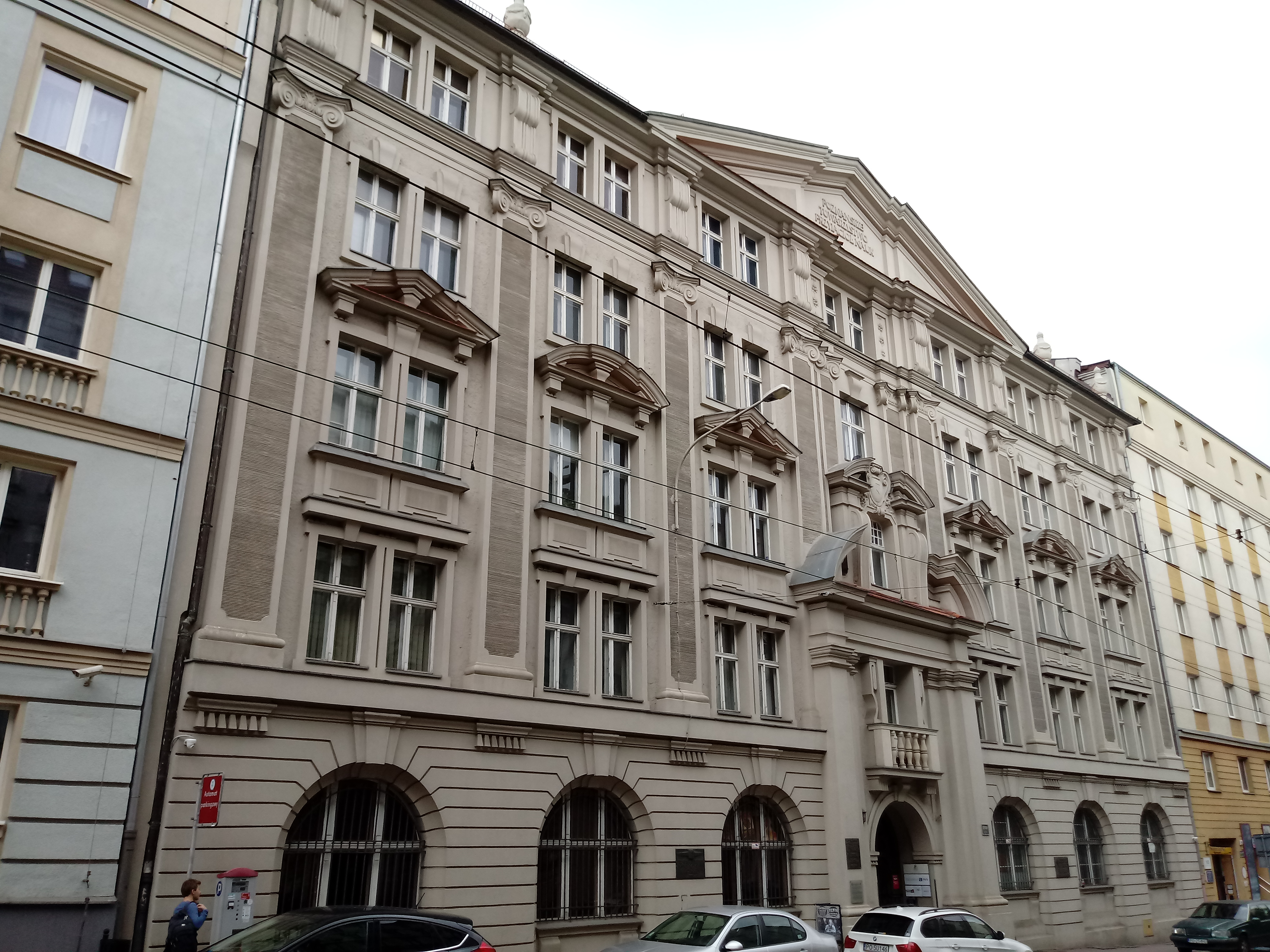
The headquartersof the Poznań Society for the Advancement of Arts and Sciences (2017)

- August Cieszkowski
- Tytus Działyński
- August Cieszkowski (second term)
- Karol Libelt
- Stanisław Egbert Koźmian,
- August Cieszkowski (third term)
- Archbishop Edward Likowski
- Heliodor Święcicki
- Bronisław Dembiński
- Zygmunt Lisowski
- Zygmunt Wojciechowski, Kazimierz Tymieniecki, Stefan Barbacki, Gerard Labuda, Zdzisław Kaczmarczyk, Zbigniew Zakrzewski.

== Noted members ==
- August Cieszkowski (1814–94), Polish philosopher, social and political activist, co-founder of the Polish League (Liga Polska), co-founder and president of the PTPN
- Stefan Cybichowski (1881-1940), Polish architect and social activist
- Tytus Działyński (1796–1861), Polish political activist, protector of arts
- Kazimierz Jarochowski (1828–88), Polish historian, publicist of the Dziennik Poznański (Poznań Daily), co-founder of PTPN
- Karol Libelt (1807–75), Polish philosopher, political and social activist, president of PTPN
- Teofil Matecki (1810–86), Polish physician, social activist, member of PTPN, founder of the Adam Mickiewicz monument of Poznań
- Leon Wegner (1824–73), Polish economist and historian, co-founder of PTPN

== Periodicals ==
- Badania Fizjograficzne nad Polską Zachodnią
- Roczniki Historyczne
- Roczniki Dziejów Społecznych i Gospodarczych
- Slavia Occidentalis
- Lingua Posnaniensis
- Studia Automatyki

== See also ==
- Warsaw Society of Friends of Learning
- Academy of Sciences
- Polish Academy of Learning
- Polish Academy of Sciences
