= Witold Jakóbczyk =

Polish historian (1909–1986)

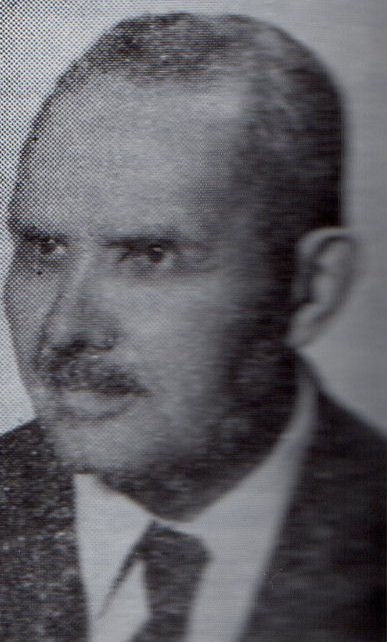
Witold Jakóbczyk

Witold Jakóbczyk (Polish pronunciation: [ˈvitɔlt jaˈkupt͡ʂɨk]; 15 January 1909 in Sosnowiec – 3 October 1986 in Poznań) was a Polish historian and professor at Poznań University, specializing in the history of Greater Poland in the 19th century.

== Publications ==
- Galos, Adam; Felix Heinrich Gentzen; Witold Jakóbczyk; Janusz Pajewski (1966). Dzieje Hakaty. Poznań: Instytut Zachodni. OCLC 378512.
- Jakóbczyk, Witold (1976). Pruska komisja osadnicza 1886–1919. Poznań: Wydawnictwo Poznańskie. OCLC 3864469.
- Jakóbczyk, Witold (1989). Przetrwać na Wartą 1815–1914. Warsaw: Krajowa Agencja Wydawnicza. ISBN 978-83-03-02503-6. OCLC 231003736.
- Witold Jakóbczyk (ed.), Studia nad dziejami Wielkopolski w XIX w., vol.I–III, Poznań 1951–1967.
- Witold Jakóbczyk (ed.), Wielkopolanie XIX w., Poznań 1969.
- Witold Jakóbczyk (ed.), Wielkopolska. Wybór źródeł, t. I 1815–1850, Wrocław 1952.
- Witold Jakóbczyk (ed.), Wielkopolska. Wybór źródeł, t. II 1851–1914, Wrocław 1954.

== See also ==
- History of Poznań
- Greater Poland
- Grand Duchy of Poznań
