= Walenty Stefański =

Polish politician (1813–1877)

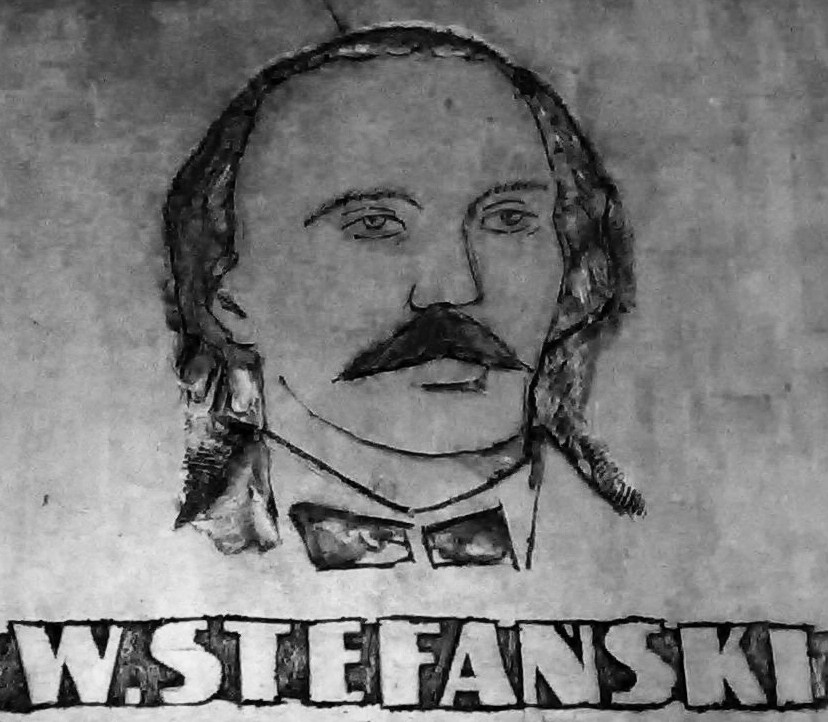
Image of Stefański at the Imperial Castle in Poznań

Walenty Stefański (12 February 1813 in Śródka, Poznań County - 30 June 1877 in Pelplin) was a bookseller and publisher from the Kingdom of Prussia. He was also a political activist and co-founder of the Polish League (Liga Polska). He supported autonomy for Greater Poland during the Greater Poland Uprising of 1848 against Kingdom of Prussia, and was a member of the Polish National Committee (1848).

Son of a fisherman, Stefański came from a lower-class family and was mostly self-educated. He taught himself French and Latin and learned German while working as an apprentice to a German owned printer. As a teenager he took part in the November Uprising in Congress Poland against Russian rule.
