= Hipolit Cegielski =

Polish businessman and activist

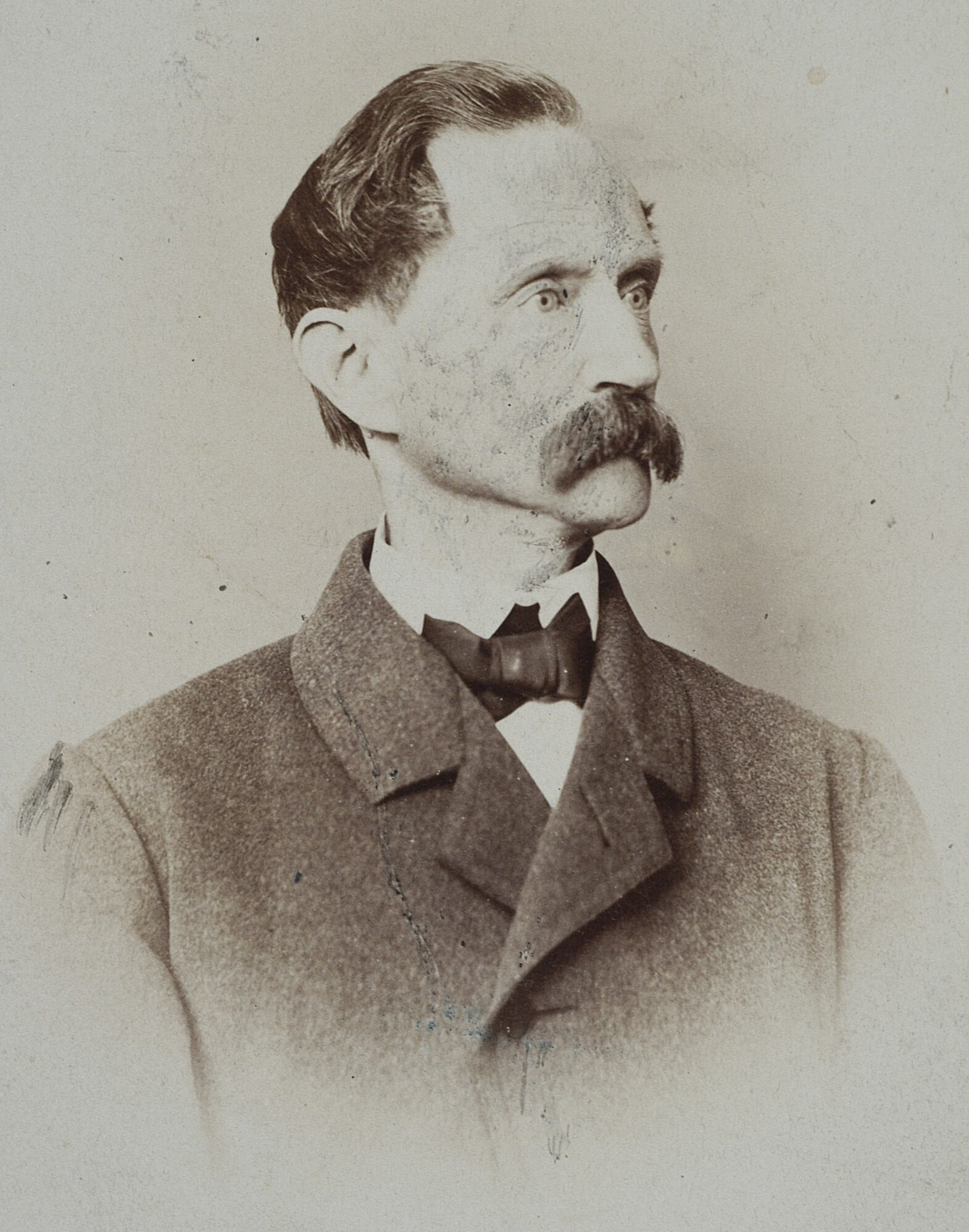
- Cegielski
- Born: 6 January 1813; Ławki
- Died: 30 November 1868 (aged 55); Posen (Poznań), Kingdom of Prussia

Hipolit Cegielski (6 January 1813 – 30 November 1868) was a Polish businessman and social and cultural activist. He founded H. Cegielski – Poznań in 1846.
