= Dziennik Poznański =

Polish newspaper

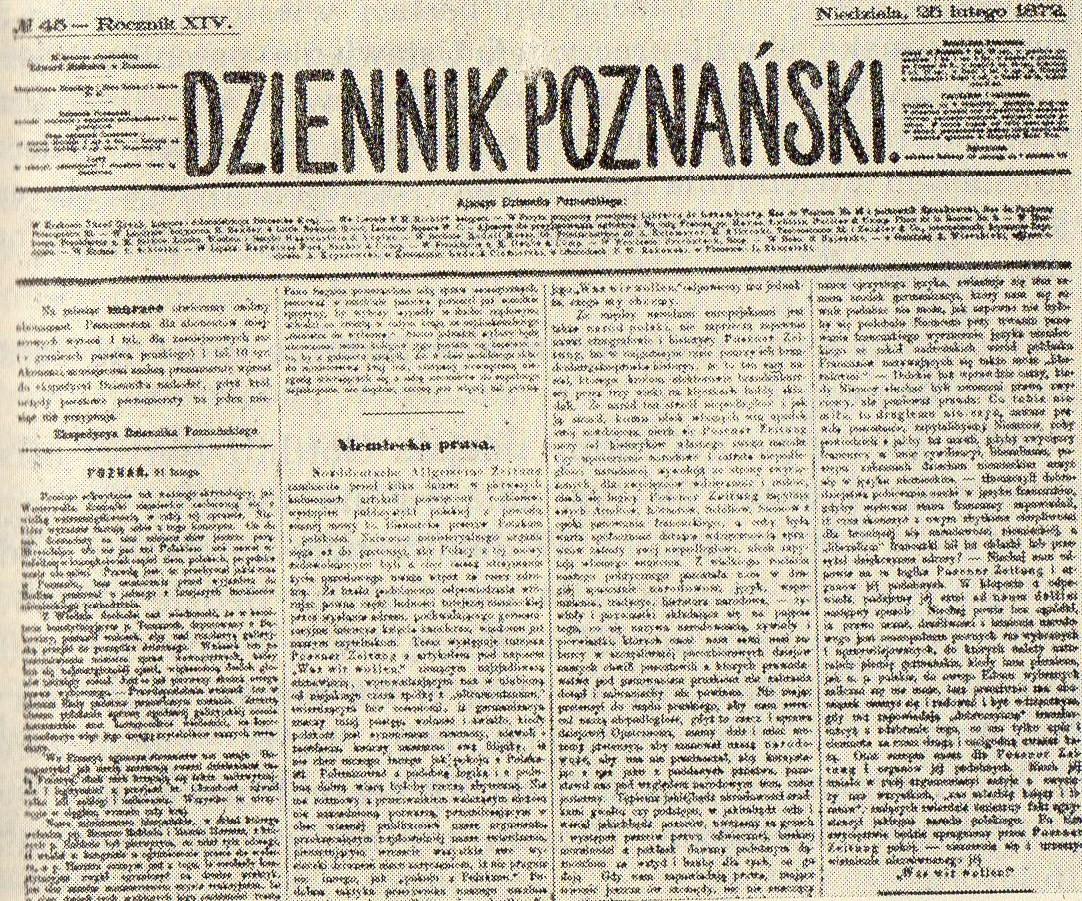
Front page of Dziennik Poznański dated February 25, 1872

Dziennik Poznański (transl. Poznań Daily) was an information and current affairs newspaper that was originally founded as a magazine. It was published in 1859–1939 in Poznań. It was briefly reestablished in independent Poland from 1991 to 1999.

Founded by Hipolit Cegielski, it initially represented liberal landlord ideologies, and later expanded to include conservative ones. During the interwar period, it supported the Sanation political movement.

It was headed by Władysław Bentkowski, Hipolit Cegielski, Józef Jagielski and Franciszek Dobrowolski.
