= Czapski =

Czapski (feminine: Czapska; plural: Czapscy) is a Polish surname. It belongs to the Polish noble House of Czapski (also Hutten-Czapski) of Leliwa coat of arms heraldic clan.

== People ==
- Jan Chryzostom Czapski (1656–1716), Polish statesman
- Alexandrine von Hutten-Czapska (1854–1941), Polish novelist
- Józef Czapski (1896–1993) Polish artist, author, critic, and an officer of the Polish Army
- Ceclava Czapska (1899–1970), impostor of Grand Duchess Maria Romanov
- Maria Czapska (1894–1981), Polish writer and historian
- Emeryk August Hutten-Czapski (1897–1979), politician, military officer, diplomat and Bailiff of the Polish Sovereign Military Order of Malta
- Karol Hutten-Czapski (1860–1904), Mayor of Minsk between 1890 and 1901
- Bogdan Hutten-Czapski (1851–1937), politician, curator of the University of Warsaw and the Warsaw University of Technology, President of the Association of Polish Knights of Malta
- Emeryk Hutten-Czapski (1828–1896), politician, historical collector and numismatist, founder of The Emeryk Hutten-Czapski Museum
- Stanislaw Hutten-Czapski (1779–1844), Colonel in the Napoleonic wars
- Franciszek Stanisław Hutten-Czapski (1725–1802), Polish Senator, Governor of Chelmno

== See also ==
- Czapski family
