= Józef Napoleon Hutten-Czapski =

Polish activist and insurgent (1797–1852)

Józef Kazimierz Sulpicjusz Napoleon Hutten-Czapski
- Leliwa coat of arms
- Born: 25 March 1797; Bromberg, German Empire
- Died: 17 September 1852 (aged 55); Smogulec, German Empire
- Other names: Józef Napoleon, Joseph Chapman, O'Brien
- Occupations: Insurgent, independence and national activist
- Known for: Creator of t1939)
- Spouse: Eleonora Czarnecka
- Children: Bogdan Hutten-Czapski
- Family: Leliva family
- Awards

Józef Napoleon Hutten-Czapski (1797-1852), from the Polish noble Leliwa family, was an insurgent during the November Uprising and an independence activist. He was the father of Bogdan Hutten-Czapski.

== Biography ==
=== Youth ===
Józef Napoleon was born on 25 March 1797, in then Bromberg. He was the son of Kornelia née Plewińska and Józef Hutten-Czapski (1760-1810), a count and general in the Crown Army. He received his first education in Bromberg, then studied at the Piarists college in Warsaw, from where he graduated in 1815.

Designated in his father's will as the sole heir, at the latter's death in 1810, he felt into a dispute with his uncle Mikołaj Hutten-Czapski, who denied his rights to the inheritance. According to Józef's biography in the Polish Biographical Dictionary, certain indications could hint that Napoleon Hutten-Czapski was an illegitimate son recognized later by his father. As a result of the contention, Józef wound up as receiving only one of his father's farms ( or folwark) in Orłów near the then-Prussian city of Soldau. Furthermore, the Prussian authorities did not want to recognize his noble origins nor grant him the title of count. As a consequence, Józef Napoleon decided to sell his newly acquired folwark and moved back to the area of Bromberg. He ostentatiously called himself a "peasant" and from that moment on only used his confirmation name as a first name, i.e. Napoleon .

Between 1818 and 1821, Józef attended lectures at the Breslau (today's Wrocław) university and structured the very large Polish community into an academic corporation called "Polonia", modeled on the German Burschenschaft. Likewise, he established contacts with liberal German youth movements and with the secret anti-Russian organizations in the Congress Poland. These actions were noticed by the police who sentenced him to two months in prison, expelling him from the university.

Once released, Napoleon transferred to the Russian Poland where he purchased the Osówki estate (Masovian Voivodeship). At first the Russian authorities confirmed his noble title. However, Nikolay Novosiltsev, the local chief of the secret police, assessed him as a leader of the internationalist revolutionary youth movement, present all over Europe: accordingly, Konstantin Romanov then Governor of the Kingdom of Poland, ordered the decision to be rescinded.

In the following years, Józef Napoleon traveled extensively. For a while (1830), he stayed in Prussian Bromberg where he co-organized and co-led a patriotic conspiracy. Tracked by the Prussian authorities, one of the conspirators was found to have an important stock of weapons, ammunitions and medicines shipped by Hutten-Czapski from Paris.

=== November uprising ===
The outbreak of the November Uprising (end of 1830) found Józef Napoleon Czapski in Paris. There, he was giving speeches in honor of Poland and Polish brotherhood, dragging attention for Polish uprising in France. He arrived in Poland in January 1831 on a false French passport. In April, he served in the "Poznań volunteer cavalry regiment" and fought in various battles and skirmishes (near Minsk, Ostrołęka, Łysobyki, Potycz and Nieborów). For his combat actions during the expedition to Siedlce, he was awarded the Golden Cross of the Virtuti Militari. From May to August, he was the Aide-de-camp to Jan Zygmunt Skrzynecki, the commander-in-chief of the uprising. On 11 May 1831, he was promoted to the rank of second lieutenant, and on 31 July to lieutenant.

Józef Napoleon was present as well during the siege of Warsaw, where he arrived against orders as his regiment was not taking part in the defense of the city. Despite the looming failure of the uprising, he gave invigorating speeches, demanding the head of the generals. Such a stance put him before a military court: arrested by general Henryk Dembiński, he was released by general Jan Krukowiecki. On 24 September 1831, he was handed out a passport for scientific travel to France, England and other European countries, but he could no longer use it.

After the end of the revolt, Napoleon, under a changed name, made his way across the Kingdom of Prussia. The Prussian authorities labelled him the Robespierre of the uprising and tracked him with an arrest warrant. Denounced while staying in Gdańsk, Hutten-Czapski was arrested and detained for two weeks.

=== Exile ===
On 14 December 1831 Józef Napoleon boarded an English ship and sailed to Ireland: he reached Belfast at the end of January 1832. Before long, he arrived to Dublin where he was received with an ovation. At many meetings with Daniel O'Connell's supporters, he made patriotic speeches quoted by Irish newspapers, which draw the attention of the police.

Hutten-Czapski was fined £60 for revolutionary activities and illegal stay in Great Britain. The majority of the Irish population sided with him: a street collection and public lectures were organized to pay the fine and grant him the permission to reside in England, where he moved in April 1832 and stayed for almost a year. On his way to London, he stopped in Birmingham and attended a large rally advocating political reforms. In addition, on 23 May, he accompanied a political delegation coming from Birmingham to be received by the Lord Mayor of London. In early 1833, masonic friends obtained for him a French passport under the alias of Joseph Chapman.

From 1833 to 1837, Józef Napoleon was constantly on the move, especially between Paris and Switzerland. Indeed, together with other young revolutionaries and Carbonari, he had founded there the "Young Europe" union on 15 April 1834. This movement gathered the following organizations: "Young Italy", "Young Germany" and "Young Poland" (Polish: Młoda Polska). He also traveled to Italy, Algeria, Spain and to London, where he met Giuseppe Mazzini then in exile.

In 1841, he went to Germany (Munich, Augsburg, Frankfurt) with a false passport under the identity of O'Brien, an Irishman. He was enthusiastically welcomed by his colleagues from the "Young Germany" organization, who helped him to go to (Russian) Congress Poland. In 1842, Czapski was arrested in Aachen for using a false passport, tried and sentenced. After a parole release, pending a decision from the Berlin Supreme Court, he left to France, where he lived until 1847.

In the French country, Napoleon was engaged in scientific and publishing works. Additionally, he was well-known for his generosity towards his fellow citizens in exile.

=== Back to Poland ===
From 1844, Józef applied for permission to settle in Prussia. In 1846, he received the acquittal of the Supreme Court in Berlin and one year later he could return to occupied Greater Poland.

He did not take part in the Greater Poland Uprising (1848). In September 1852, as a representative of the local landed gentry, he attended the ceremony of opening the Bromberg–Piła railway line, chaired by King Frederick William IV of Prussia. Later on, he contracted cholera and was treated in Smogulec: he died on 17 September 1852 and was buried there.

== Family ==
Once established back in Prussian Poland, Józef Napoleon married Eleonora Czarnecka née Mielżyńska (1815–1875) on 29 January 1850. She was the daughter of General Stanisław Kostka Mielżyński.

=== Father-in-law, Stanisław Kostka Mielżyński ===
Stanisław Kostka Mielżyński (1778-1826) was a military who fought during the Napoleonic Wars:

- in 1806, he served in the 3rd infantry regiment in Poznań and was appointed colonel;
- in 1807, he fought with his regiment near Tczew and entered Gdańsk captured by French troops. In 1808, his regiment was appointed to the Free City of Gdańsk;
- in 1809, Mielżyński distinguished himself in the defense of Toruń against Austrian forces. He received the Order of Virtuti Militari for his bravery;
- on 20 March 1810, he was promoted to brigadier general;
- in 1812, he accompanied Dąbrowski's division in Napoleon's Russian campaign;
- in 1813, he fought in the defense of Gdańsk against Bernadotte's Swedes and Prussians forces.

In 1815, after exile of Napoleon Bonaparte, Mielżyński managed his estates in Greater Poland (Pawłowice, Kąkolewo, Poniec, Smogulec, Gołańcz) which moved back under Prussian rule.

=== Countess Eleonora Laura Mielżyńska ===
Eleonora was first married to Karol Czarnecki (1804-1888), a poet who took refuge near Smogulec after the end of the November uprising. She was at the time a wealthy countess, owner of the Smogulec estate. The union occurred in 1834. In 1836, they had a daughter Maria Eleonora Anna Czarnecka (1836-1920). Thanks to his wife's connections, the Prussian authorities extended the residence permit of Czarnecki (then a Russian subject) every year. In 1839, he was even allowed to purchase the Chwaliszewo estate near Schubin; a year later, on the occasion of Frederick William IV's accession to the throne, he was granted Prussian serfdom and a recognized nobility. Karol was very active in the field of arts, sponsoring exhibitions and publications.

Accused of a crime of indecency, Czarnecki had to flee from Prussia and remained abroad until 1850. In between, Eleonora fell in love with Józef Napoleon, then administrator of her estate. She got the annulment of her first marriage in 1850 and espoused Hutten-Czapski the same year. A year later, their son Bogdan Franciszek Serwacy was born.

In the meantime, Karol Czarnecki returned to Prussia in 1850, but was arrested for his crimes and was sentenced to a year and a half in the prison of Koronowo. When he returned to freedom, his ex-wife was widowed: however, fearing Karol's deeds, she asked the authorities to ban him to stay in Prussia. The Prussian minister of interior, though allowing him to return to his estate of Chwaliszewo in 1853, banned any contacts with Eleonora. Eventually, she took refuge in Switzerland with her son Bogdan. She died in Berlin on 6 December 1875.

== Fragmentary family tree and biographies ==
- Franciszek Mirosław Czapski (1607-1677)
  - Jan Chryzostom Czapski (1656-1716)
    - Ignacy Hutten-Czapski (1700-1746)
      - Ludwika Hutten-Czapska (1720-?)
      - Anna Hutten-Czapska (1720-1789) married Teodor Pawłowski (1710-?)
      - Józef Hutten-Czapski (1722-1765)
      - Antoni Michał Hutten-Czapski (1725-1792)
        - Mikołaj Adrian Joachim Hutten-Czapski (1753-1833)
        - Józef Grzegorz Longin Hutten-Czapski (1760–1810)
          - Józef Napoleon Hutten-Czapski (1797-1852)
            - Bogdan Hutten-Czapski (1851-1937)
              - Emeryk August Hutten-Czapski (1894-1979), son of Karol Jan Alexander Hutten-Czapski, adopted
      - Franciszek Stanisław Hutten-Czapski (1725-1802)
        - with Eleonora Laura Działyńska (1743-1763)
          - Maria Hutten-Czapska (1760-?)
          - Anna Hutten-Czapska (1760-?)
        - with Zofia Mielżyńska (1741-1771)
          - Ignacy Hutten-Czapski (1770-?)
          - Franciszek Hutten-Czapski (1767-?)
        - with Weronika Joanna Radziwiłł (1754-?)
          - Stanisław Hutten-Czapski (1779-1844)
            - Marian Hutten-Czapski (1816-1875)
            - Edward Czapski (1819-1888)
            - Adolf Hutten-Czapski (1819-1883)
          - Karol Józef Hutten-Czapski (1777-1836)
            - Maria Salezja Salezya Hutten-Czapska (1818-1897)
            - Adam Józef Erazm Hutten-Czapski (1819-1884)
            - Karol Ignacy Hutten-Czapski (1832-1877)
            - Emeryk Zachariasz Mikołaj Hutten-Czapski (1828-1896)
              - Zofia Hutten-Czapska (1857-1911)
              - Karol Jan Alexander Hutten-Czapski (1860-1904)
              - Elżbieta Hutten-Czapska (1867-1877)
              - Jerzy Hutten-Czapski (1861-1930)
                - with Józefa Thun-Hohenstein (1867-1903)
                  - Leopoldyna Elżbieta Hutten-Czapska (1887-1969)
                  - Elżbieta Maria Hutten-Czapska (1888-1972)
                  - Karolina Maria Hutten-Czapska (1891-1967)
                  - Maria Dorota Leopoldyna Hutten-Czapska (1894-1981)
                  - Józef Czapski (1896-1983)
                  - Stanisław Gedeon (1898–1959)
                  - Róża Maria Hutten-Czapska (1901-1986)
                - with Polina Annenkowa (1873–1955)
                  - Teresa (1903)

=== Franciszek Mirosław Czapski (1607-1677) ===
Chamberlain of Malbork, he married Zofia von Holtzen. Their issue includes, among others:

- Tomasz Franciszek (1675–1733), bishop of Chełmno;
- Jan Chrysostom (1656–1716), castellan of Elbląg;
- Piotr Aleksander (1660-1717), castellan of Chełmno.

=== Jan Chryzostom Czapski (1656-1716) ===
He married Ludwika Rudnicka. Jan took part in the Battle of Vienna (1683). He successively held the offices of chamberlain of Malbork, castellan of Kruszwica (from 1693) and castellan of Elbląg (from 1699).

=== Ignacy Hutten-Czapski (1699-1746) ===
He was a member of Parliament of the Pomeranian Voivodeship at the Sejm of 1730 and at the ordinary Pacification sejm of 1735.

He held the office of Gdańsk of castellan from 1737 to 1746. He was married to Teofila Konopacka (1680-1733), the daughter of Stanisław Aleksander Konopacki, then castellan of Chełmno.

=== Józef Hutten-Czapski (1722-1765) ===
He was a general of the Crown Army, castellan of Elbląg (1758-1765) and Pomeranian chamberlain (from 1757). He was rewarded the Order of the White Eagle for his services.

His first weeding (with Marianna Karłowska) did not give any issue. His second wife, Elżbieta Hutten-Czapska, was the great-granddaughter of Sebastian Czapski (?-1699), then castellan of Chełmno and a distant relative of Józef. They had 3 children, Brygida (1758–1801) and Teofilia (1760-?) and Ignacy.

=== Antoni Michał Hutten-Czapski (1725-1792) ===
Antoni was a lieutenant general of the Crown troops, chamberlain of Chełmno (1762–1792) and commissioner of knighthood in the Military Commission of the Crown (1765–1770).

He was decorated with the Order of Saint Stanislaus (1766) and was married to Kandyda Rozalia Lipska (1721-?), the daughter of Józef Lipski, castellan of Bełsk and Łęczyca.

=== Mikołaj Adrian Joachim Hutten-Czapski (1753-1833) ===
Mikołaj was born on 8 September 1753, in Bukowiec. In 1766, he was commissioned by his father into the Prussian army and served in Finckenstein's dragnons stationed in Morąg and Ostróda. In 1771, he was transferred to Brodnica and Lidzbark, and participated in expeditions against the Bar Confederation.

Thanks to his father's connections, he joined the Crown Army as a captain in a cavalry regiment: in 1777, he reached the rank of colonel. On 6 December 1789, he was promoted to major general. Under the authority of Prince Józef Poniatowski, he commanded a brigade of cavalry and infantry. After accepting Polish citizenship (1791), he joined the Friends of the Constitution and few months later (February 1792), he surrendered his command and moved to Warsaw.

He did not accept the Targowica Confederation but did not resign: eventually in 1794 he was deprived of his general functions and the related salaries. At the outbreak of the Kościuszko Uprising, he was in Warsaw but had to leave in August 1794 to Wrocław to treat an illness.

From 1795 onwards, Mikołaj permanently resided in a palace in Bromberg from where he was administering the family estate in Bukowiec, co-owned with his brother Józef. On 27 September 1804, together with Józef, he obtained the Prussian title of count, leading to the addition of a "von Hutten" to his name. In 1807, during the Duchy of Warsaw, he was vice-president of the Administrative Chamber of the Bydgoszcz Department, but he soon resigned from this position. He died on 13 June 1833 in Bydgoszcz.

Mikołaj was married to Maria Hutten-Czapska (1760-?). The couple had 2 children, Franciszek Ignacy Dionizy (1797-1862) and Antonina Hutten-Czapska (1802-1872).

King Stanisław August Poniatowski rewarded him the Order of Saint Stanislaus (1792).

=== Józef Grzegorz Longin Hutten-Czapski (1760-1810) ===
Józef was born on 12 March 12, 1760, in Bukowiec near Świecie. His father placed him in the Corps of Cadets at the age of 10 for two years. In 1772, he attended for two years the Jesuit's "Collegium Nobilium" in Warsaw.

In 1777, he served as a captain under his brother Mikołaj's command in the cavalry regiment stationed in Radom.

In 1783, after his father's resignation, he was promoted to colonel, while his brother took over the command of the regiment. In 1790, he was promoted to brigadier general and commanded a Cavalry Brigade of Greater Poland. During the Polish–Russian War of 1792, Józef was a member of the General Staff of the Polish Army. In 1794, he momentarily joined the Kościuszko Uprising, but soon lost enthusiasm for it and took refuge under an assumed name with his mother in Bydgoszcz while his regiment was virtually wiped out in the battle of Maciejowice and during the Russian assault on Warsaw.

In November 1794, he returned to the Polish capital in order to salvage the remains of his destroyed property; he then gradually (1795–1798) established close relations with the Prussian officials in Bydgoszcz/Bromberg. On 27 September 1804, both brothers (Mikołaj and Józef) obtained from the authorities the title of count ("von Hutten"). A year later, Józef sold half of his estate of Bukowiec to his brother.

During the Napoleonic years of the Duchy of Warsaw, Józef was appointed in March 1807 as a civil servant to the newly created Bydgoszcz Department. Afterwards, he became a conciliar -then vice-president and president- of the Court of Appeal of the department and an examiner of the Cadet Corps. He was married to Marianna Kornelia Pławińska (1770-1810).

He died on 3 October 1810, in his hometown of Bukowiec.

King Stanisław August Poniatowski rewarded him the Order of Saint Stanislaus (1789).

=== Stanisław Hutten-Czapski (1779-1844) ===
Stanisław Hutten-Czapski was born in 1779 in Nieśwież (in present day Belarus). He spent his childhood in Nieśwież and went to school in Vilnius. In 1811, he received the Ordynacja of Kejdany (today's Kėdainiai in Lithuania) from his cousin Dominik Hieronim Radziwiłł, as part of his mother's dowry.

In 1812, Stanisław funded the 22nd Infantry Regiment of the Duchy of Warsaw: at its head (as a colonel), he took part in the Russian campaign of 1812 where he fought in the Battle of Berezina (26-29 November 1812). The same year, he received the Order of Virtuti Militari and the following year the Legion of Honour for his bravery during the 1813 campaign.

After Napoleon's defeat, Stanisław stayed in Paris until 1815. He then had to return to Kiejdany as the authorities of the Tsar threatened to sequester his estate. Stanisław was a count and Knight of Malta (1808), member of the Grand Priory of Russia. He died in 1844 in his property of Kiejdany.

Stanisław was married to Zofia née Obuchowicza, they had three sons:

- Marian Hutten-Czapski (1816-1875), who joined the January Uprising, supporting the insurgents financially. After the defeat of the revolt in 1864, he was sentenced to hard labor in Siberia and spent three years in exile in Tomsk, while the Kiejdany estate was confiscated by the tsarist government;
- Edward Czapski (1819-1888), who supported the January Uprising and was sentenced to exile to Siberia. He wrote Memoirs of a Siberian (Polish: Pamiętniki Sybiraka);
- Adolf Hutten-Czapski (1819-1883), who served in the Army of the Russian Empire and was awarded the Saint George Cross. In 1840, he built a palace with a 5,000 hectares (12,000 acres) park on his estate of Berżany.

=== Karol Józef Hutten-Czapski (1777-1836) ===
He held the position of royal chamberlain at the court of Stanisław August Poniatowski and was the marshal of the Minsk district. Karol married Fabianna Obuchowicza (1787-1876). The couple had one son, Emeryk Zachariasz Hutten-Czapski, a scholar and Polish numismatist.

=== Jerzy Hutten-Czapski (1861-1930) ===
As the son of Emeryk Hutten-Czapski and Elżbieta née Meyendorff, Jerzy was a wealthy noble, owning estates in the area of Minsk and Volhynia. He graduated from the Imperial University of Dorpat with a diploma of doctor of Law.

In 1903, on behalf of the family, he donated his father's art collections to the National Museum in Kraków which included coins, medals, engravings, prints and books. Furthermore, he co-financed the construction of the Church of Saints Simon and Helena in Minsk. During WWI, Jerzy served as a representative of the International Committee of the Red Cross headquarters in Minsk.

In the summer of 1920, before the offensive of the Red Army, he left definitively his estate of Przyłuki, which fall in the territory of the Byelorussian Soviet Socialist Republic after the signing of the Treaty of Riga (1921). After leaving the Minsk region, he belonged to an informal political group of Vilnius conservatives, so-called Borderland bisons (Polish: Żubry kresowe), editing a political paper, Słowo (English: Word).

After Józef Piłsudski's coup (May 1920), Jerzy condemned the move, but supported the marshal's candidacy for President of the Republic of Poland.

In 1926, he served as the president of the Association of Poles in the Eastern territories and participated in a meeting at the Nesvizh Castle with Józef Piłsudski, where he delivered a speech expressing hope for the reconstruction of Poland's influence in the region.

Jerzy died in 1930, in his palace in Mordy.

On 7 August 1886, he had married Józefa (1867-1903), Thun und Hohenstein countess, in the Děčín Castle. They had eight children:

- Leopoldyna (1887–1969), mother of Ludwik Maria Łubieński and grandmother of Rula Lenska, a Brithish actress;
- Elizabeth (1888–1972):
- Karolina (1891–1967);
- Maria (1894–1981), a Polish writer;
- Józefa (1896–1993), a Polish painter and author;
- Stanisław (1898–1959);
- Róża (1901–1986), great grandmother of Róża Thun (b. 1954), a Polish politician and fr:Henryk Woźniakowski a Polish editor and translator.
- Teresa (1903).

== See also ==
- Bydgoszcz
- Czapski family
- Leliwa coat of arms
- Russian tradition of the Knights Hospitaller
- Emeryk Hutten-Czapski Museum

== Bibliography ==
- Błażejewski, Stanisław; Kutta, Janusz; Romaniuk, Marek (1997). Bydgoski Słownik Biograficzny. T.4 [Bydgoszcz biography dictionary. T.4] (in Polish). Bydgoszcz: Kujawsko-Pomorskie Towarzystwo Kulturalne. pp. 36–37. ISBN 83-85327-42-8.
- Graf von Hutten-Czapski, Bogdan (1936). Sechzig Jahre Politik und Gesellschaft. T.1/2 [Sixty years of politics and society T.1/2] (in German). Berlin: E. S. Mittler.
- Konarski, Simon (1958). Armorial de la noblesse polonaise titrée [Armorial of the titled Polish nobility] (in French). Paris.
