= Hutten-Czapski =

Coat of arms of Counts Hutten-Czapski

Hutten-Czapski (feminine: Hutten-Czapska) is a Polish noble surname. It belongs to Polish noble House of Czapski. Members of the family held the hereditary title of Count and used Leliwa coat of arms as their heraldic clan.

== Notable members ==
- Emeryk Hutten-Czapski (1828–1896), Polish nobleman, Count, scholar, ardent historical collector and numismatist
- Emeryk August Hutten-Czapski (1897–1979), Polish Count, politician, military officer, diplomat and Bailiff of the Polish Sovereign Military Order of Malta
- Karol Hutten-Czapski (1860–1904), Polish philanthropist, Mayor of Minsk
- Stanisław Hutten-Czapski (1779–1844), Polish Count and Colonel in the Napoleonic wars
- Alexandrine von Hutten-Czapska (1854–1941), morganatic second wife of Louis IV, Grand Duke of Hesse, son-in-law of Queen Victoria
- Maria Czapska (1894–1981), Polish author, essayist, historian, actually countess Hutten-Czapska
- Józef Czapski (1896–1993) Polish artist, author, and critic, as well as an officer of the Polish Army, actually count Hutten-Czapski

== See also ==
- Czapski
- Czapski family
