= Czapski family =

Polish noble family

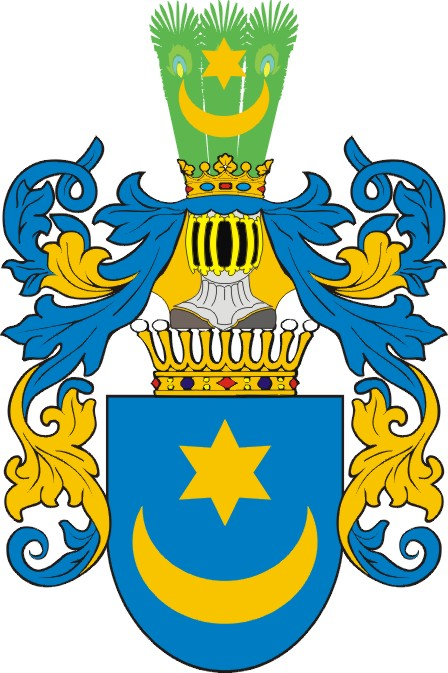
Coat of arms of Counts Hutten-Czapski

The Hutten-Czapski family (feminine: Hutten-Czapska), or simply Czapscy, or Czapski, is an old Polish aristocratic family originating in Pomerania. Some branches were given the title of Count. Members of the family have contributed to Poland's political, cultural and military history. Some members of the family were first recorded serving as Prussian Baltic knights, their allegiance was to Poland.

== Origin and history ==
It is not entirely clear when and where the Czapski name had its beginnings. One version is that they are related to the old Prussian von Hutten family who appeared in the year 930. A Dietrich von Hutten, along with other nobles, was summoned in 1112 by Bolesław III Wrymouth, Duke of Lesser Poland, to help fight against the pagan Prussians. Dietrich distinguished himself in battle in 1113, and Bolesław promoted him to knight, giving him a coat of arms and the village of Leliwa. Descendants of Dietrich von Hutten later adopted the Teutonic name of von Smolangen. And then one of the von Smolangens, changed the name to von Hutton, and added Czapski to it. There is not much hard evidence that this is the beginning even though it is mentioned in some sources.

What is clear, is that the Czapskis originated from the Smolag, Pomeranina Voivodeship, near Gdańsk. For many centuries the Czapskis occupied high administrative and military rank in the region. It is therefore possible, as other references claim, that the beginning was with Hugo von Smolangen II, who was in 1482 the Castellan of Gdańsk.

The most clearly and certifiable beginning was when, in 1526, Sigismund I of Poland gave to a magistrate named Martin, the village of Czaple. Juliusz Czapski, Marcins grandson, expanded the Czapski family holdings to include the villages of Smętowo, Chwarzno, Swarozyn and Smętówko. At the end of the sixteenth century the Czapskis were one of the wealthiest noble families in the region of Gdańsk. At some point, perhaps bridging both the Prussian/Polish relationship as well as loyalties, the von Hutten was most likely added relating the German Hut (hat or cap in German) to the Polish tchapska, also meaning hat, and thereby constructing the name Hutten-Czapska; hat in German and in Polish.

Through the centuries, the Czapskis rose in prominence and power as large landowners of significant political and social importance. The family grew further in prestige in the 18th century under the rule of Stanisław August Poniatowski, and branched out to Lithuania, Ukraine, Belarus and Russia. Through marriage, the Czapskis were connected to some of the well known Polish families such as the Princes Czetwertyński and Radziwiłł, Counts Chodkiewicz, Działyński, Goetzendorf-Grabowski, Małachowski, Miełżyński, Plater-Zyberg, Potocki, Potulicki, Pusłowski, Raczyński, Rzewuski, Zamoyski. The family is also closely related to other European aristocratic families, such as Thun und Hohenstein, Stackelberg and the Meyendorff von Uexküll. In particular, the marriage of Franciszek Stanisław Hutten-Czapski, Voivode Chelmiński to Princess Weronika Joanna Radziwill (b. 1754) in the 18th century brought great wealth and properties to what was called the Chelmno branch of the Czapskis. Among the Czapskis are thirteen senators, various Governors, Castellans, Counselors, Chamberlains, Bishops and Generals. There are six recipients of Poland's highest award, the Order of the White Eagle, four recipients of Poland's highest award for bravery in battle: the Virtuti Militari, and two Bailiffs of the Order of Malta. In the 17th century, a Sebastian Czapski married a Konopacka, the maternal aunt of the famous astronomer Copernicus.

== Title of Count ==
On 27 September 1804 brothers Nicolas and Joseph Czapski, both former generals of the First Polish Republic (the Polish–Lithuanian Commonwealth), received from King Frederick William III of Prussia, the hereditary title of Count with the Prussian name Graf von Hutten. On 3 November 1861, as a result of the friendship of his mother with King Wilhelm I of Prusia, Bogdan Hutten-Czapski was confirmed as a Prussian count. On 12 June 1874 the brothers Adam, Igancy and Emeryk Hutten-Czapski were confirmed as counts by the Tsar of the Russian Empire. On 28 June 1895 the title was reconfirmed by the Russian Empire, and on 14 June 1900 the title was confirmed for Stanisław Antoni and Mikolaj (Nicolas) Hutten-Czapski.

== Coat of Arms ==
Coat of arms used by the descendants of Emeryk. Adam and Karol-Igancy Hutten-Czapski since 1874

The Leliwa coat of arms, or crest, was used by several hundred szlachta families during the existence of the Kingdom of Poland and the Polish-Lithuanian Commonwealth, and remains in use today by many of the descendants of these families. There are several forms of the arms, all of which bear the name Leliwa. The Leliwa coat of arms was historically used by the Czapskis as well as other well known noble Polish families such as the Tarnowski, Sieniawski, Morsztyn, Hlebowicz, Tyszkiewicz, and Średziński families. As of 1874, with the confirmation by part of Imperial Russia of the Hutten-Czapski title, the descendants of Karol Hutten-Czapski (1777–1818), began to use a new family achievement. The new coat of arms includes two eagles, with Leliwa crests on their chests, on either side acting as supporters of the shield. Below the shield and two eagles is the family motto: "Vitam Pariae Honorem Nemini" (No life Without Honor for Country). The shield is quartered into four squares, upper left and lower right with the Hutten crest, and upper right and lower left, the Leliwa crest. Above is a nine pointed crown representing the title of Count. Above the crown, to the right, Representing the Czapski name, is a crowned helmet with five peacock feathers on which is placed the half moon and star of Leliwa. To the Left, representing the Hutten name, mounted on a helmet, is a bearded man dressed in red and white robe and cap.

== Notable descendants ==
- Franciszek Mirosław Czapski (1607–1677), Chamberlain of Malbork, Castellan of Chełmno, participant of the Battle of Berestechko,
- Sebastian Czapski (1640–1699), Castellan of Chełmno, Chamberlain of Marienburg,
- Alexander John Czapski (d.1711), Chamberlain of Malbork, Brother of Mirosław and Sebastian.
- Jan Chryzostom Czapski (1656–1716), Castellan of Elblag 1699, Kastellan of Kruszwica participant of the Battle of Vienna
- Aleksander Peter Czapski (1670–1717), Voivode of Pomerania in 1716, Castellan of Chełmno 1710, Castellan of Kruszwica 1703, Senator for the Kingdom of Poland
- Franciszek Tomasz Czapski(1670–1733), Bishop of Chełmno
- Francis Czapski (1680–1736) Castellan of Gdańsk.
- Alexander Czapski (1685–1737), Governor of Pomerania
- Jan Ansgary Czapski (1690–1742), Treasurer of the Crown, Marshall of the Court, Governor of Chełmno, Knight of the Order of the White Eagle 1732
- Ignatius Czapski (1699–1746 ), Castellan of Gdańsk
- Walenty Aleksander Hutten-Czapski (1682–1751), Bishop of Kujawien 1741, Bishop of Przemyśl, former Abbot of Monastery Pelplin 1734, Knight of the Order of the White Eagle 1740
- Franciszek Hutten-Czapski (1700–1736), Castellan of Gdańsk 1725, Senator for the Kingdom of Poland
- Ignacy Hutten-Czapski (1700–1746), Castellan of Gdańsk 1737, Senator for the Kingdom of Poland
- Michał August Hutten-Czapski (1702–1796), Voivode of Malbork. Knight of the Order of the White Eagle 1758
- Thomas Czapski (1711–1784), Governor of Wola Knyszyńska, Received Czapski Palace in Warsaw as part of his wife's dowry;
- Michael Czapski (1702–1796), the last governor of Malbork; Knight of the Order of the White Eagle
- Józef Hutten-Czapski (1722–1765), Polish General Major, Castellan of Elblag, Senator for the Kingdom of Poland, Knight of the Order of the White Eagle in 1760
- Franciszek Stanisław Hutten-Czapski (1725–1802), Voivode of Kulm, Castellan of Gdańsk, Senator in the Kingdom of Poland, member of the Sejm of the Fourth Sejm, Knight of the Order of the White Eagle in 1762
- Antoni Hutten-Czapski (1725–1792), Polish Lieutenant General in 1784, General Advisor to King Stanislaus II August, Order of St. Stanislaus 1766
- Urszula Hutten-Czapska (1730–1782), Married to Count Stanisław Małachowski, author of the constitution of 1791, held various high political posts, including Marshall of the Sejm.
- Mikołaj (Nicholas) Hutten-Czapski (1753–1833), Polish General Major, Chief of the Polish Cavalry, participant of Polish-Russian war in 1792, Order of Saint Stanislaus.
- Joseph Gregory Longin Hutten-Czapski (1760 1810), Major General Royal army, the President of the Court of Appeal in Bydgoszcz at the time of the Duchy of Warsaw.
- Karol Jozef Czapski (1777–1836), Chamberlain of King Stanisław August Poniatowski, Last Governor of Chelmno.
- Stanisław Hutten-Czapski (1779–1844) Soldier(Colonel), participant in Napoleonic Wars, Virtuti Militari, 3rd Class.
- Józef Napoleon Hutten-Czapski (1797–1852) Soldier(Lieutenant), Independence activist, Virtuti Militari, 4th Class.
- Marian Hutten-Czapski (1816–1875), Naturalist, biologist and lawyer, Russian Imperial Chamberlain, Author of "the History of the Horse", Poznań, 1874, participant of January uprising of 1863.
- Emeryk Hutten-Czapski (1828–1896), Vice-Governor of St. Petersburg, Governor of Novgorod Governorate, Director of the Forestry Administration. Donated his Palace with his numismatica and book collection to the city of Cracow.
- Bogdan Hutten-Czapski (1851–1937), Prussian-Polish politician, author, hereditary owner of Smogulec palace. Knight of Malta
- Alexandrine von Hutten-Czapska (1854–1941), Married 1885 (in second morganatic marriage) with Ludwig IV, Grand Duke of Hesse. The marriage was annulled for dynastic reasons, which led to a scandal.
- Karol Hutten-Czapski (1860–1904), President of Minsk (1890–1901), philanthropist.
- Maria Czapska (1894–1981), Nom de guerre: Dorothy Obuchowicz, Maria Strzałkowska, Dorothy Thun, Author, researcher and essayist, During WW2 she was a member of the Polish underground and the Żegota Organization.
- Józef Czapski (1896–1993), Soldier (Major), author and painter in the succession of Fauvism and Paul Cézanne, Virtuti Militari, 5th class.
- Emeryk August Hutten-Czapski (1897–1979) Politician, military officer, diplomat and Baliff of the Polish Order of Malta
