= Karol Libelt =

Polish politician and author (1807–1875)

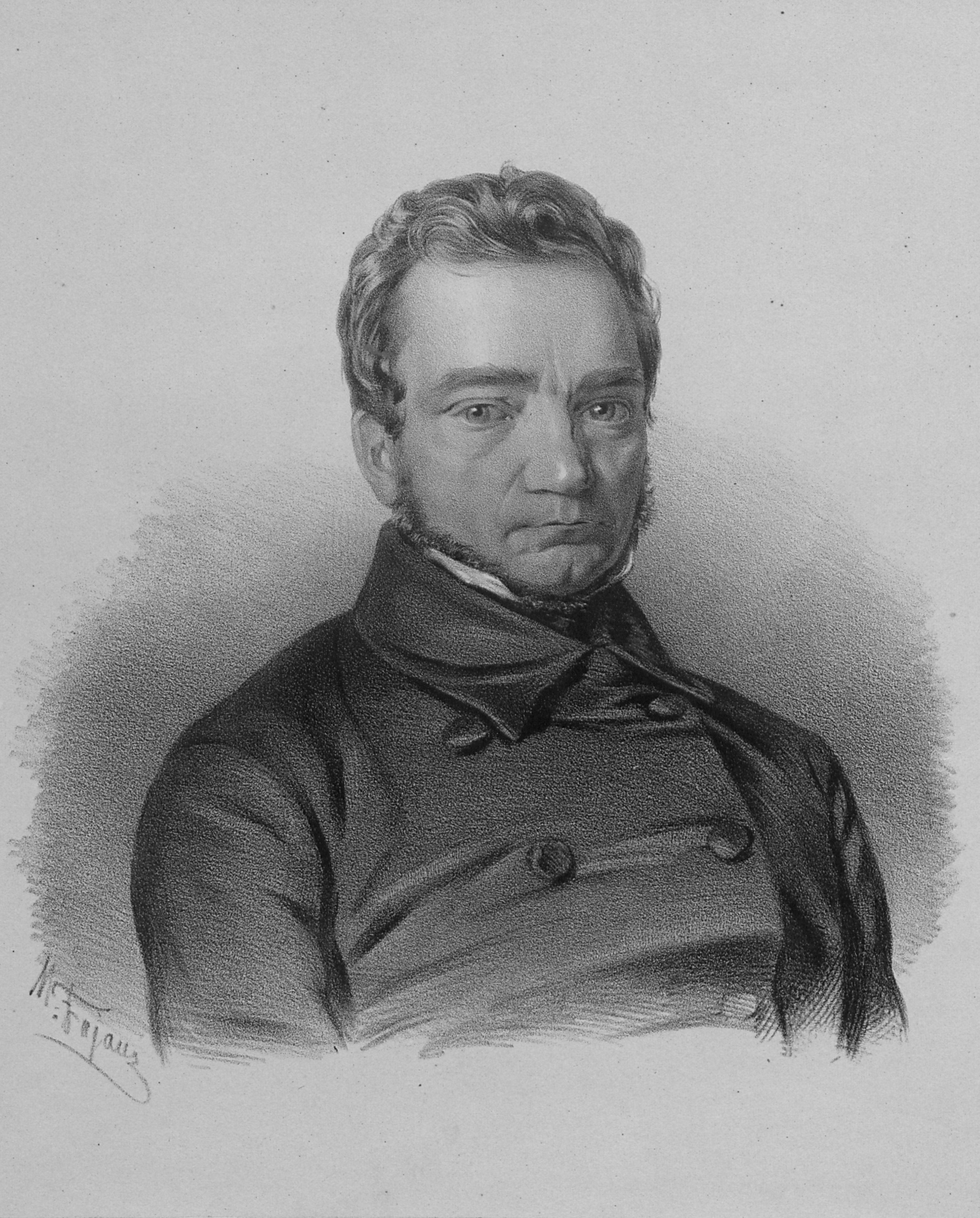
- Portrait of Libelt by Maksymilian Fajans, c.1850s-70s
- Born: Karol Fryderyk Libelt; 8 April 1807; Posen, South Prussia, Kingdom of Prussia
- Died: 9 June 1875 (aged 68); Brdowo, Province of Posen, German Empire
- Other name: Karl Friedrich Libelt

Karol Libelt (8 April 1807, Poznań, South Prussia – 9 June 1875, Brdowo) was a Polish philosopher, writer, political and social activist, social worker and liberal, nationalist politician, and president of the Poznań Society of Friends of Learning.

== Life and work ==
Libelt took part in the failed November Uprising against Russia in 1830, and was imprisoned for nine months at Magdeburg. From 1839 he became the head of a secret committee started in order to organise another uprising against the partitioning powers, which was nicknamed the Libelt Committee (Polish: Komitet Libelt). He was sentenced by the Prussian authorities to 20 years of imprisonment for taking part in the Greater Poland Uprising of 1846. However, he was amnestied in 1848 and returned to Posen, where he took part in the Greater Poland Uprising of 1848 and joined various organisations supporting the independence of Poland (Polish National Committee and Revolutionary Committee). During the Spring of Nations he was elected as one of the members of the Frankfurt Parliament. He also took part in the Slavic Congress in Prague in June 1848.

In 1849 he was elected a member of the Prussian parliament and became the director of the liberal Dziennik Polski (Polish Daily). The following year Libelt began to establish various scientific and social organisations in Greater Poland, including the Society of Friends of the Sciences in Posen, which became a de facto university. Between 1868 and 1875 he headed the Society and gave lectures in aesthetics. In 1873, he was elected to the Prussian Lower House.

In his philosophical works, Libelt described the so-called Polish messianism, or a belief that the history of the world would be redeemed by the Polish people, who gained moral excellence because of the suffering of their fatherland. He believed in existence of a super-rational cognitive power, visible through art. He is known internationally because the word "intelligentsia" was popularized by him in his book Filozofia i krytyka (Philosophy and Critics).

== Writings ==
- Filozofia i krytyka (1845–50)
- Estetyka (1851)
- Umnictevo (1857)
- Dziela (1875)
- Zbior pism pomniejszych (1849–51)
- Dziewica Orléanska (1847)
- Humor i pravada (1852)

== See also ==
- Poznań Society of Friends of Learning
- History of philosophy in Poland
- List of Poles
