= Tomczyce, Greater Poland Voivodeship =

Tomczyce
- Village
- Location within Poland
- Coordinates: 52°57′N 17°16′E
- Country: Poland
- Voivodeship: Greater Poland
- County: Wągrowiec
- Gmina: Gołańcz
- Population: 188

Tomczyce ([tɔmˈt͡ʂɨt͡sɛ]; German: Tomschütz) is a village in the administrative district of Gmina Gołańcz, within Wągrowiec County, Greater Poland Voivodeship, in west-central Poland.
