= Laskownica Wielka =

- Village
- Location within Poland
- Coordinates: 52°54′12″N 17°16′18″E
- Country: Poland
- Voivodeship: Greater Poland
- County: Wągrowiec
- Gmina: Gołańcz
- Population: 170

Laskownica Wielka [laskɔvˈnit͡sa ˈvjɛlka] is a village in the administrative district of Gmina Gołańcz, within Wągrowiec County, Greater Poland Voivodeship, in west-central Poland.
