= Oleszno, Greater Poland Voivodeship =

Oleszno
- Village
- Location within Poland
- Coordinates: 52°58′N 17°20′E
- Country: Poland
- Voivodeship: Greater Poland
- County: Wągrowiec
- Gmina: Gołańcz

Oleszno ([ɔˈlɛʂnɔ]; German: Riesenburg) is a village in the administrative district of Gmina Gołańcz, within Wągrowiec County, Greater Poland Voivodeship, in west-central Poland.
