= Buszewo, Wągrowiec County =

Buszewo
- Village
- Location within Poland
- Coordinates: 52°58′1″N 17°13′22″E
- Country: Poland
- Voivodeship: Greater Poland
- County: Wągrowiec
- Gmina: Gołańcz
- Population: 60

Buszewo ([buˈʂɛvɔ]; German: Grünheim) is a village in the administrative district of Gmina Gołańcz, within Wągrowiec County, Greater Poland Voivodeship, in west-central Poland.
