= Aleksander Piotr Mohl =

Polish military officer

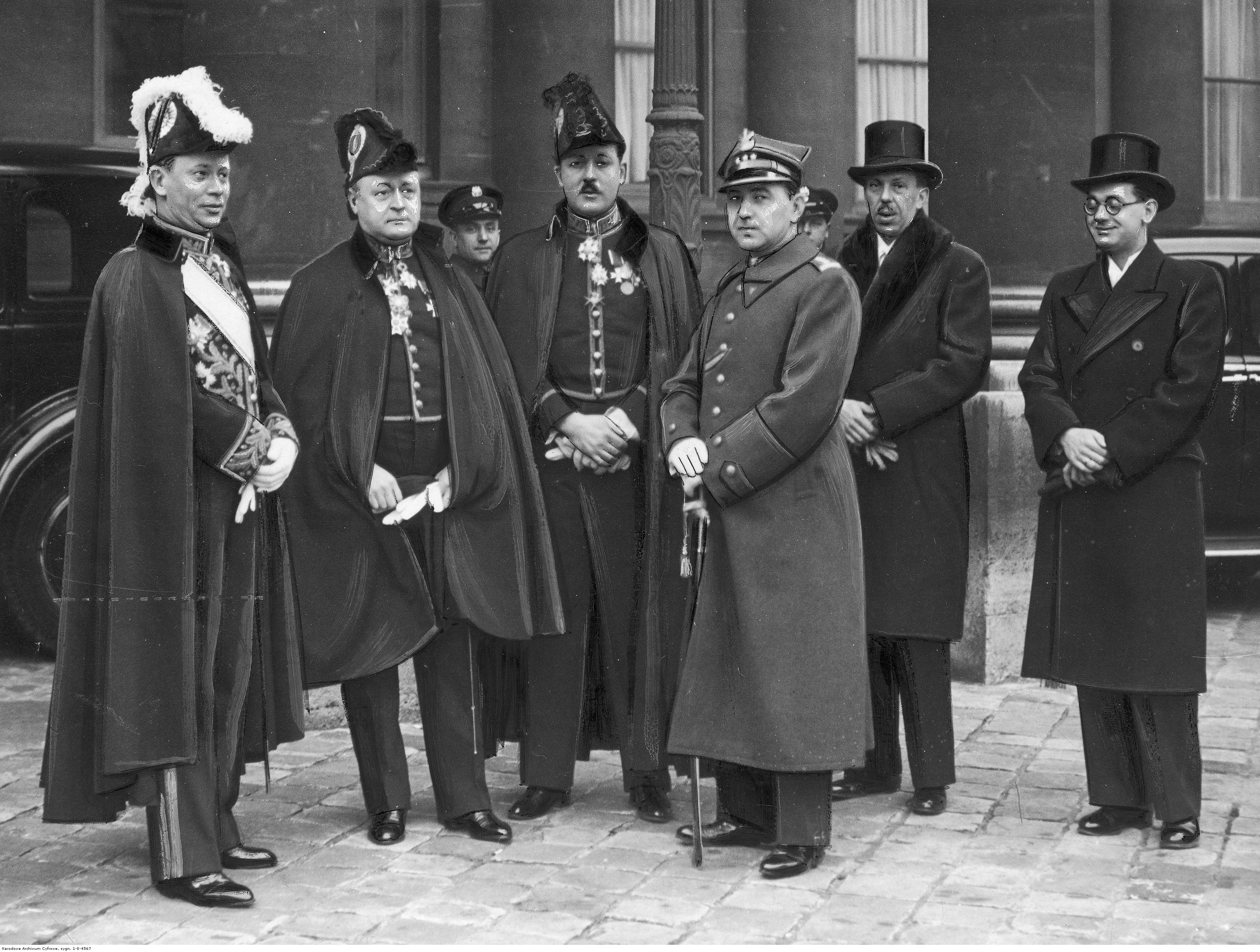
New Year's reception for the diplomatic corps at French President Albert Lebrun at the Elysée Palace in Paris. Diplomats in the courtyard of the Polish embassy. Standing from the left: Ambassador of the Republic of Poland in France Juliusz Łukasiewicz, Counselor of the Embassy Feliks Frankowski, 1st Secretary of the Embassy Aleksander Mohl, military attaché Colonel Wojciech Fyda, First Secretary of the Embassy Tadeusz Wierusz-Kowalski, attaché of the Polish Embassy in Paris Stanisław Sośnicki. Concern

Aleksander Piotr Mohl (alt. Alexander), Count, (November 18, 1899 – June 26, 1956) was a Polish military officer, diplomat and intelligence officer.

== Early life ==
Aleksander Piotr Mohl was born on November 18, 1899, at Wyszki, the Mohl estate in Courland which is today Latvia. The estate was destroyed in World War I, and today the Technical College occupies its grounds, while still standing are the stables, servant quarters as well as the park. The town of Višķi today uses the Mohl crest as the towns emblem. The Mohl family were an old noble Baltic family tracing their lineage to the 15th century. Originally known as Graf von der Mohl, the name was shortened to Mohl in order to make it sound more Polish. Aleksander's father was Count (hrabia) Hieronim Mohl (1871–1939), and his mother was Vera Letitia Bornholdt (1874–1908) daughter of Niels Peter Bornholdt, a Danish shipping magnate. He was educated at his father estate Wyszki, until 1911. In 1912, he attended the Grabowski school in Stara Wies close to Warsaw. Due to illness he had to leave the school and travelled to France. When he returned he enrolled in the Russian gymnasium in Jelgawa, moving during the war to Smolensk and Yalta, (Crimea), where he graduated in 1918. While at university he formed part of the Arkonia Academic Corporation, one of Poland's oldest, largest and most dynamic of academic organizations. When the Germans occupied Crimea he returned to his father's estate and started studying at the Polytechnic School at Riga. He left Riga two months before it was captured by Bolsheviks and went to Berlin and then Dresden.

In late January 1919, he illegally crossed the German border volunteered for the Polish army and served as private, NCO, and later a cadet officer in the 10th Lithuanian Uhlan Regiment. He was then sent as a student to the school of technical squadrons (Szwadrony Techniczne) located in the "Kosciuszkowski" sapper training camp. He graduated with excellent grades and became an instructor. Alexander was then commandeered to the II unit of the Army Staff (Intelligence). He left the regiment in October 1920 to continue his studies. He graduated from the Poznan University of Technology in political science in 1922.

== Personal life ==
In September 1929 he married Countess Elżbieta Hutten-Czapska at the Albertyn estate of the Puslowski family. In 1929 Elżbieta and Aleksander had twin daughters, Therese and Sophie. He ended his military career in 1930 as a Second Lieutenant with the 13th Regiment of Wilno Uhlans. During that year his wife died of complications during an operation gone wrong.

In 1940, Mohl fled to Portugal on the SS Nyassa. His two daughters were sent to live with Mary Anne Payne Clews Blumenthal (with whom he was having an affair) at her mansion, La Lanterne, in Brookville, New York. At the time she was still married to her husband George Blumenthal (banker). Mohl was in phone contact with Mary Anne from Portugal, where he was based, until the FBI cut them off. Mohl's brother, Maurice, and his first wife Ada, fled to New York as well. Maurice Mohl's wife reportedly had an affair with Otto Abetz, Hitler's man in Paris. Aleksander is mentioned in intelligence briefings to the US president in regards to a possible coup plot by a ring led by Allen W. Gullion, mainly due to their mutual personal relationships.

== Diplomatic career ==
From 1925 to 1927 he served as Secretary of the Marshal of the Senate of the Republic of Poland, Wojciech Trąmpczyński. He continued serving as Secretary of the Marshal of the Senate for Julian Szymański from 1928 to 1930. From 1930 to 1935 he served a third term as Secretary of the Marshall of the Senate, now under Władysław Raczkiewicz, who had succeeded Szymanski.

Mohl's Prussian Baltic aristocratic background was useful to Poland in the years prior to the war in trying to bridge an increasingly difficult relationship with Germany. In those years Hermann Göring frequently visited Poland, "ostennsibly to hunt actually to reconnoiter elite sentiment". Alexander was called upon to accompany Göring on his visits.

Towards the end of 1936 Aleksander was appointed to his first assignment abroad as First Secretary of the Polish Embassy in Paris, serving under Ambassador Juliusz Łukasiewicz. This was an important promotion for Aleksander. The Polish embassy in France was considered the most important link in the Polish diplomatic network as France was, at the time, considered Poland's main ally. Ambassador Lukasiewicz was a very experienced diplomat and a close associate, and personal friend, of Polands Foreign Minister, Jozef Beck. Aleksander, or "Olko" as he was nicknamed, was very well liked and made many friends in Paris beyond the diplomatic circles such as Antoine de Saint-Exupéry. Ambassador Lukasiewicz said that he was a very precise barometer, feeling every change in the surrounding situation. At some point he was promoted to counselor in Paris.

Before the Germans occupied Paris in 1940, most of the Polish Embassy staff, including Mohl who was embassy counselor at the time, left the city.

From 1940-1943, Mohl served as head of the delegation of Poland to France at the Embassy in Lisbon, Portugal. From 1943 to 1944, Aleksander moved to the position of Counselor of the Polish Embassy in Algiers. He became one of the most popular persons in the temporary capital of the Free French Forces, acting as a "connector" of great value. The diplomats were fond of him, politicians trusted him and even officers of the allied command, normally reluctant with civilians, liked him. The Polish ambassador in Algiers, Kajetan Morawski, was surprised to find that Aleksander, for whom nothing was sophisticated or good enough in Paris, was accepting all the inconveniences in Algiers with cheerfulness and a good mood. Morowski found that for all of Aleksander's cosmopolitan background, (he spoke fluently French, German, English, Russian, Italian and Spanish, and adapted easily to any of those cultures), he had very strong feelings for Poland and was very much a patriot. He was energetic and bustling, and very much preferred to talk than fulfill his bureaucratic duties. When the Germans left Paris, the Polish Embassy was reopened with Kajetan Morawski as ambassador. Aleksander served Morawski as Counselor of the Embassy from 1944 to 1945. The war ended and the Western Powers gave into Stalin's demands, withdrawing the accreditation of the Polish government-in-exile.

== Intelligence officer ==
During the war, Mohl served as an intelligence officer for the Polish government in exile.

He is mentioned as a possible source of an intelligence leak from William J. Donovan to the Abwehr in 1942 regarding American war plans in Europe. At the time, US planning was to hold off the US invasion until arms production tilted the war in America's favor, expecting the Soviets to hold off. Mohl held an extensive discussion with Donovan at the time in Washington.

== After the war ==
At the end of the war, Aleksander was stateless and could not return to Poland. He moved to Madrid. He tried mediating between American funds and underinvested Spanish companies. Though a good mediator, he was not a good businessman. He was very generous, loved to live life and did not count its value in a monetary sense. Always impeccably dressed, he escorted some of the well-known socialite ladies of the day such as Mrs Margaret Biddle. Aleksander died in Madrid on June 26, 1956, due to cancer, and was buried in the Cementerio de San Justo.

== Awards and honors ==
- The French Legion of Honour, Commander Class;
- The Yugoslav Order of St Sava, Commander Class;
- The Estonian Order of the Cross of the Eagle, Commander Class,
- The Order of Polonia Restituta, Officer Class;
- The Silver Cross of Merit (Poland),
- 1918-1921 Polish War Medal.
- Order of the Crown (Belgium), Officer Class;
- Order of the Star of Romania, Officer Class.

== Bibliography ==
- Łukasiewicz, Juliusz (1970). Jedrzejewicz, Waclaw (ed.). Diplomat in paris, 1936-139. Papers and memoirs of Juliusz Lukasiewicz, Ambassador of Poland. New York: Columbia University Press. ISBN 0231033087.
- Baltische Ritterschaften: Livland. Estland. Kurland. Œsel.
- Memoires, By Fabianna Godlewska, 1994, Edited by Marie-Christine and Karol Godlewski
