= Morakowo =

- Village
- Location within Poland
- Coordinates: 52°55′N 17°21′E
- Country: Poland
- Voivodeship: Greater Poland
- County: Wągrowiec
- Gmina: Gołańcz

Morakowo [mɔraˈkɔvɔ] is a village in the administrative district of Gmina Gołańcz, within Wągrowiec County, Greater Poland Voivodeship, in west-central Poland.
