= Chojna, Wągrowiec County =

Chojna
- Village
- Location within Poland
- Coordinates: 53°0′N 17°17′E
- Country: Poland
- Voivodeship: Greater Poland
- County: Wągrowiec
- Gmina: Gołańcz

Chojna ([ˈxɔi̯na]; German: Choyna) is a village in the administrative district of Gmina Gołańcz, within Wągrowiec County, Greater Poland Voivodeship, in west-central Poland.
