= Gręziny =

- Village
- Location within Poland
- Coordinates: 52°53′48″N 17°21′06″E
- Country: Poland
- Voivodeship: Greater Poland
- County: Wągrowiec
- Gmina: Gołańcz

Gręziny ([ɡrɛ̃ˈʑinɨ]; German: Grenschin) is a village in the administrative district of Gmina Gołańcz, within Wągrowiec County, Greater Poland Voivodeship, in west-central Poland.
