= Lęgniszewo =

- Village
- Location within Poland
- Coordinates: 52°56′34″N 17°24′02″E
- Country: Poland
- Voivodeship: Greater Poland
- County: Wągrowiec
- Gmina: Gołańcz

Lęgniszewo ([lɛnɡniˈʂɛvɔ]; German: Idasheim) is a village in the administrative district of Gmina Gołańcz, within Wągrowiec County, Greater Poland Voivodeship, in west-central Poland.
