= Jeziorki, Wągrowiec County =

Jeziorki
- Village
- Location within Poland
- Coordinates: 52°59′11″N 17°15′38″E
- Country: Poland
- Voivodeship: Greater Poland
- County: Wągrowiec
- Gmina: Gołańcz

Jeziorki [jɛˈʑɔrki] is a village in the administrative district of Gmina Gołańcz, within Wągrowiec County, Greater Poland Voivodeship, in west-central Poland.
