= Grabowo, Wągrowiec County =

Grabowo
- Village
- Location within Poland
- Coordinates: 52°58′N 17°15′E
- Country: Poland
- Voivodeship: Greater Poland
- County: Wągrowiec
- Gmina: Gołańcz

Grabowo [ɡraˈbɔvɔ] is a village in the administrative district of Gmina Gołańcz, within Wągrowiec County, Greater Poland Voivodeship, in west-central Poland.
