= Izabella Godlewska =

Polish painter and sculptor

Izabella Godlewska de Aranda (18 December 1931 in Słonim – 12 June 2018 in Madrid) was a Polish painter and sculptor. Her work was exhibited at the National Museum, Kraków in 2005, and is in the collections of the District Museum in Toruń. She was a great-granddaughter of numismatist Emeryk Hutten-Czapski.
