= Alexandrine von Hutten-Czapska =

Polish novelist (1854–1941)

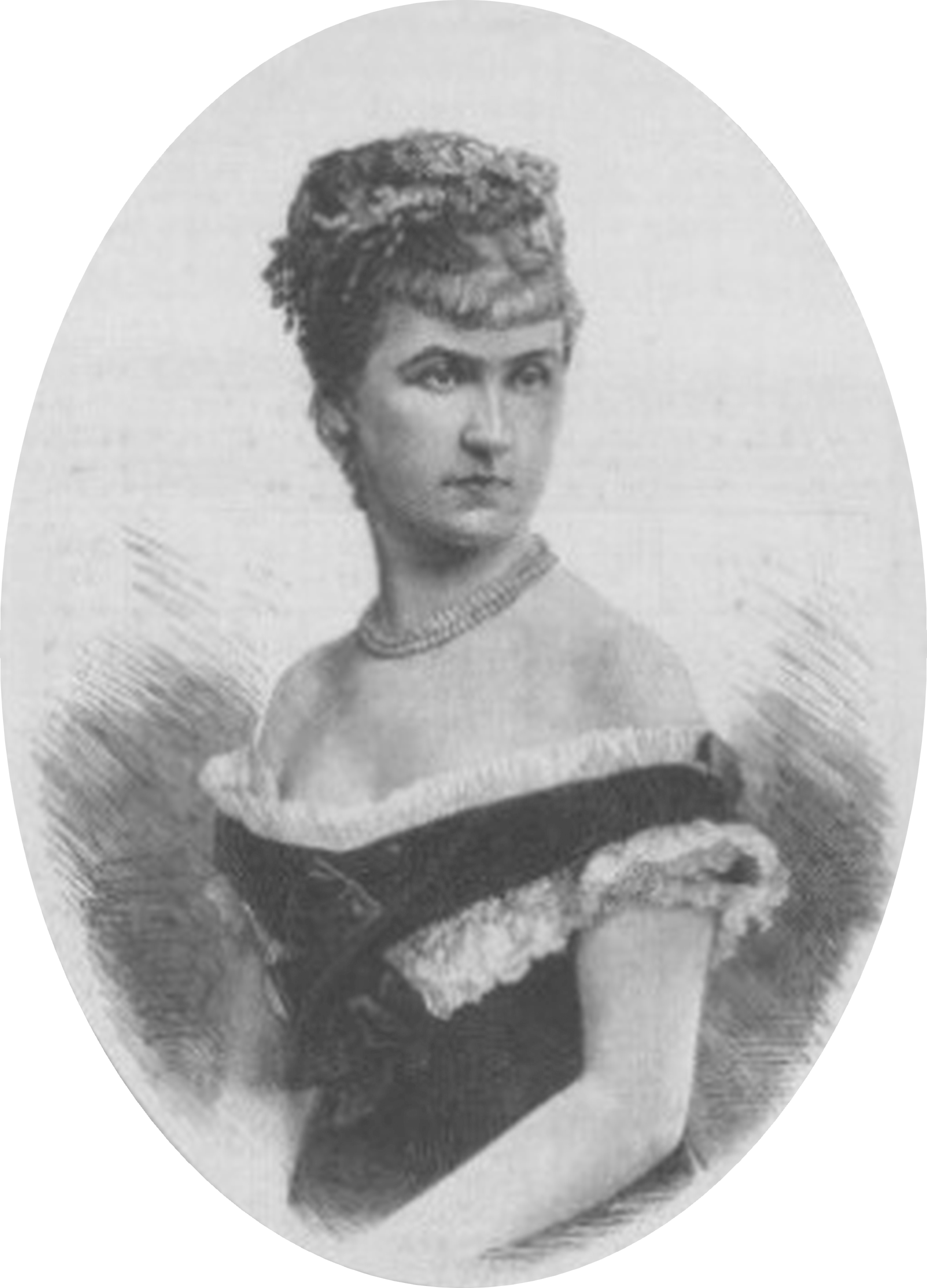
- Portrait of Alexandrine as Frau von Kolemine
- Born: Aleksandra Joanna Maria Franciszka Fabianna von Hutten-Czapska; 3 September 1854; Warsaw, Poland
- Died: 8 May 1941 (aged 86); Vevey, Switzerland
- Burial place: St. Martin's Cemetery, Vevey
- Occupation: Novelist
- Spouses: Aleksandr Aleksandrovich von Kolemine (m. 1873; div. 1884); Louis IV, Grand Duke of Hesse (m. 1884; ann. 1884); Vasily Romanovich von Bacheracht (m. 1893)
- Children: 1
- Parents: Adam Hutten-Czapski (father); Maria Anna Katarzyna Rzewuska (mother)
- Family: Hutten-Czapski
- Writing career
- Pen name: Ary Ecilaw
- Period: 1885–1901
- Notable works: Le roi de Thessalie (1886); L'Officier bleu (1889)

Alexandrine Countess von Hutten-Czapska (3 September 1854 in Warsaw, Poland – 8 May 1941 in Vevey, Switzerland), also known as Aleksandra Joanna Maria Franciszka Fabianna or Aleksandra Adamovna Kolemina-Bacheracht, was a Polish noblewoman, novelist and published fictional works in French under the pseudonym Ary Ecilaw.

== Early life ==
She was younger daughter of Count Adam Józef Erazm Hutten-Czapski (1819—1883), a Chamberlain of the Russian Empire, and his wife, Countess Maria Anna Katarzyna Rzewuska (1827—1897). She had a brother, Count Adam Hutten-Czapski (1849—1914), and a sister, Countess Henrietta Julia of Plater-Zyberk (1847—1905). Though her mother, she was closely related to Princess Catherine Radziwill, who was a was a prominent figure at the Imperial courts in Germany and Russia. Alexandrine was Catholic, and grew up in Paris, France. She left with her mother and sister for Stockholm, Sweden, in 1870. On 21 February 1873, in the Russian church in Vevey, Switzerland, she married the Russian resident minister Aleksandr Aleksandrovich Kolemine (1844–1894), whom she had met during a trip to Switzerland. Their only son Yuri was born in 1874 in Switzerland. The couple had a stormy relationship, moved to Darmstadt, Germany, and divorced in March 1884.

Her second husband was Louis IV, Grand Duke of Hesse, widowed since the death of his wife Princess Alice in 1878. The morganatic marriage of Louis and Alexandrine lasted only a few months from 30 April to 9 July 1884, because of objections by the grand duke's late wife's mother, Queen Victoria. The union was annulled and the court in Leipzig approved the divorce on 19 December 1884. From her husband, Aleksandra received the title of Countess of Romrod and a life pension. Based on an extensive interview with her, a brochure was published in Leipzig, Germany, entitled Frau Kolemine, in which she was presented in a good light.

While it was reported that Louis' children had opposed the match and persuaded their father to annul the marriage, his daughter Princess Victoria denied this and defended her brief stepmother:

The evening of my wedding day, my father was privately married in a room in the Schloss to Countess Alexandrine Hutten Czapska, divorced from M. de Kolemine who, as Russian Charge d'affaires had been two years at Darmstadt with her, the couple separating as soon as the ceremony was over. Influenced, I fancy, by Madame de Kolemine's dread of opposition to the marriage, nobody had been told of it, except his children and prospective sons-in-law. Though Louis and Serge were in despair about it, they gave their promise to keep the secret. We others quite liked the lady, who was full of attentions towards us, and I hoped my father would feel less lonely when married to a woman he was much in love with.

On the next day the secret came out. The Prussian family, by order from above, left immediately. My Grandmother and Uncle Bertie persuaded my father to have his marriage annulled, as they convinced him, that the lady's past and reputation were such as to make it impossible for his young unmarried daughters, Irene and Alix, to grow up under her care. The annulment took place almost immediately, she retaining the title of Graefin Romrod and receiving a large yearly allowance until her death, many years later - she survived Uncle Ernie - though in the meantime she had got married to a Russian diplomat M. de Bacheracht. The whole episode was a nine days scandal in the whole of Europe and a painful one to my father and us.

== Literary career ==
Her literary career gained momentum beginning in 1884 and in a short time, her books typically reached five or six editions. It was believed that the writer behind the pseudonym Ary Ecilaw was a woman (it was also suspected incorrectly that it could be the French publisher Alphonse Lemerre). It was thought the author was someone who knew the secrets of European courts and that French was not the native language. Several of Ecilaw's books were translated into English: Roland, or The Expiation of a Sin and Le Roi de Thessalie (The Romance of a German Court) were published by Remington & Co in 1886; an alternative translation of Le Roi de Thessalie by NT Laylock as Her Royal Lover was published in New York in 1890. Le Roi de Thessalie was also translated into Italian, German and Polish. The novel served as the basis for Ecilaw's play L'Officier bleu, which was staged by Victor Koning in 1889. It's Paris premier was repeatedly delayed by scandal.

Ecilaw's novels were a success, according to Soroka:

"In 1885 and 1886, Aleksandra Adamovna published in Paris under the pseudonym 'Ary Ecilaw.' Le roi de Thessalie, 'The King of Thessaly' narrated the story of Kolemina's two marriages and divorces... The book became a scandalous success and was translated from its original French into several other languages. Today it reads poorly, the only lively parts being those in which Aleksandra Adamovna takes bites out of her heroine's enemies: the red-faced, short, and fat Queen Victoria and her brutal son-in-law the German Crown Prince Frederic." ... "Aleksandra Adamovna produced two more novels as Ary Ecilaw. One, Une Altesse Imperiale (An Imperial Highness), a lurid romance about the Romanovs, went through six editions within ten days of publication."

== Later life ==
In September 1892 or May 1893, she married Vasily Romanovich von Bacheracht (1851–1916), secretary of the Russian Empire embassy who served in several countries, with his last post in Switzerland. He was the son of Russian Consul-General Robert Gabriel von Bacheracht (1798—1884), former husband of Therese von Lützow. They had no children, but Vasily remained on good terms with his stepson Yuri. By the end of the 19th century, Aleksandra Adamovna Kolemina-Bacheracht was no longer mentioned in the press except for one exception, when she visited the Sultan's harem in Marrakesh, Morocco, and sent gifts to his wives.

On 22 July 1927, she received Swiss citizenship through naturalization.

In the last years of her life, she lived at the Hotel Trois Couronnes in Vevey. She died there at 86 on 5 or 8 May 1941 and was buried next to her last husband in the cemetery of St. Martin's parish.

== Bibliography ==
- Roland, 1885
- Le roi de Thessalie, 1886
- Une altesse impériale, 1886
- Véra, 1886 – novella published in Le Figaro
- Maël, comtesse d'Arcq, 1888
- L'Officer bleu, 1889 – play based on Le roi de Thessalie
- Une mission à la cour chérifienne: notes de voyages, 1901 – memoir of Ecilaw's visit to Morocco and commentary on the court of King Abdelaziz.
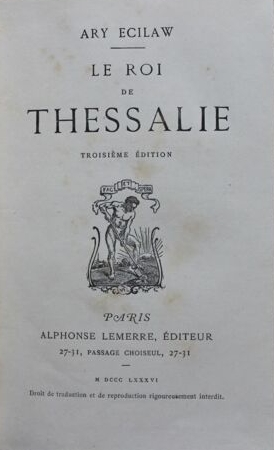
Ary Ecilaw, 1886

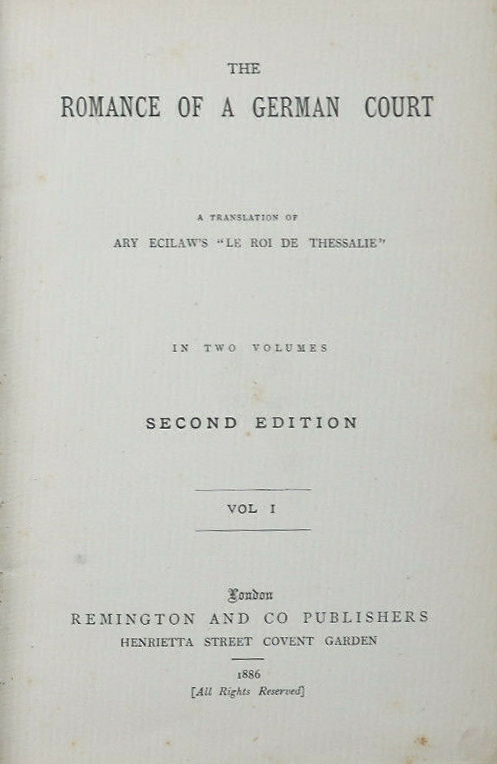
Ary Ecilaw, 1886

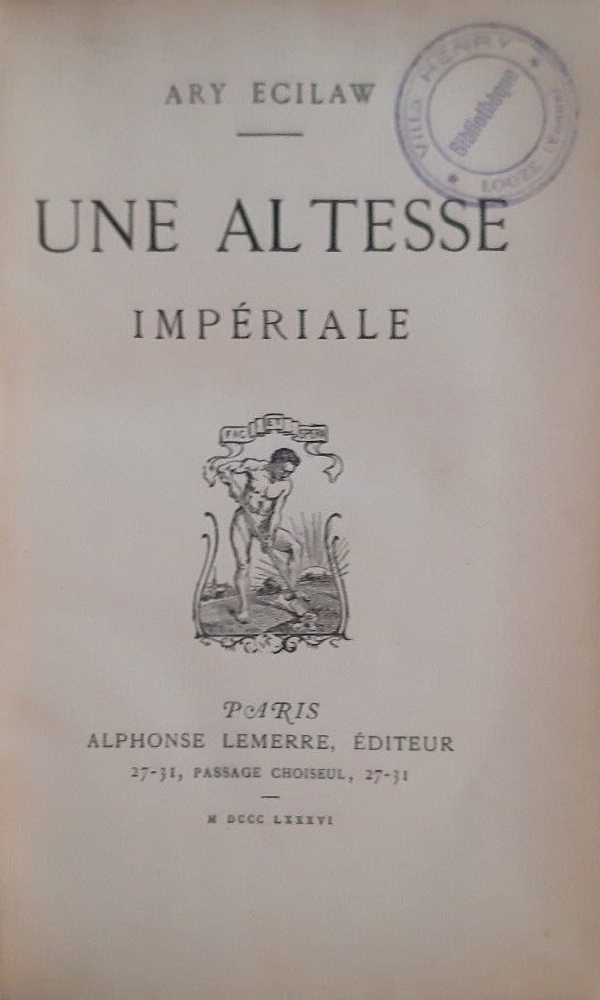
Ary Ecilaw, 1886

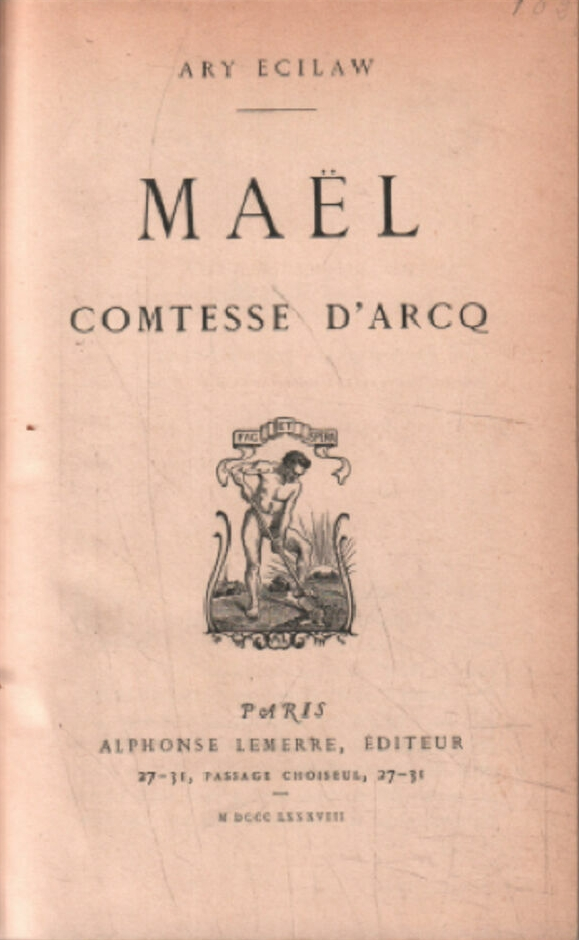
Ary Ecilaw, 1888
