= Czesławice, Wągrowiec County =

Czesławice
- Village
- Location within Poland
- Coordinates: 52°59′N 17°14′E
- Country: Poland
- Voivodeship: Greater Poland
- County: Wągrowiec
- Gmina: Gołańcz

Czesławice (Polish pronunciation: [t͡ʂɛswaˈvit͡sɛ]; German: Czeslawitz, or from 1908–1919 German: Körnersfelde) is a village in the administrative district of Gmina Gołańcz, within Wągrowiec County, Greater Poland Voivodeship, in west-central Poland.
