= Gmina Gołańcz =

Gmina Gołańcz Gołańcz Commune
- Gmina
- Coat of arms
- Interactive map of Gmina Gołańcz
- Coordinates (Gołańcz): 52°56′54″N 17°18′5″E
- Country: Poland
- Voivodeship: Greater Poland
- County: Wągrowiec
- Seat: Gołańcz

Area
  - Total: 192.13 km^{2} (74.18 sq mi)

Population (2006)
  - Total: 8,391
  - Density: 43.67/km^{2} (113.1/sq mi)
  - Urban: 3,342
  - Rural: 5,049
- Website: http://www.golancz.pl/

Gmina Gołańcz is an urban-rural gmina (administrative district) in Wągrowiec County, Greater Poland Voivodeship, in west-central Poland. Its seat is the town of Gołańcz, which lies approximately 18 kilometres (11 mi) north-east of Wągrowiec and 67 km (42 mi) north-east of the regional capital Poznań.

The gmina covers an area of 192.13 square kilometres (74.2 sq mi), and as of 2006 its total population is 8,391 (out of which the population of Gołańcz amounts to 3,342, and the population of the rural part of the gmina is 5,049).

== Villages ==
Apart from the town of Gołańcz, Gmina Gołańcz contains the villages and settlements of Bogdanowo, Brdowo, Buszewo, Chawłodno, Chojna, Czerlin, Czesławice, Czeszewo, Grabowo, Gręziny, Jeziorki, Konary, Krzyżanki, Kujawki, Laskownica Mała, Laskownica Wielka, Lęgniszewo, Morakówko, Morakowo, Oleszno, Panigródz, Potulin, Rybowo, Smogulec and Tomczyce.

== Neighbouring gminas ==
Gmina Gołańcz is bordered by the gminas of Damasławek, Kcynia, Margonin, Szamocin, Wągrowiec, Wapno and Wyrzysk.
