= Bogdanowo, Wągrowiec County =

Bogdanowo
- Village
- Location within Poland
- Coordinates: 52°58′20″N 17°18′23″E
- Country: Poland
- Voivodeship: Greater Poland
- County: Wągrowiec
- Gmina: Gołańcz
- Population: 110

Bogdanowo [bɔɡdaˈnɔvɔ] is a village in the administrative district of Gmina Gołańcz, within Wągrowiec County, Greater Poland Voivodeship, in west-central Poland.
