= Therese von Lützow =

German writer

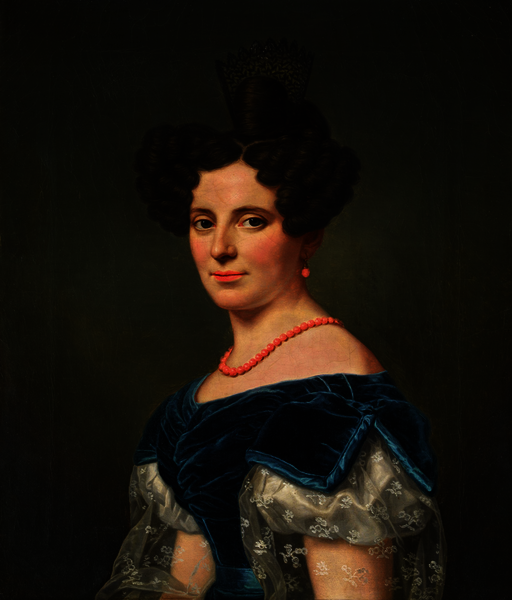

Baroness Therese von Lützow (born 4 July 1804 in Stuttgart; died 16 September 1852 in Tjilatjap, Java) published as a Young Germany writer under the pseudonym "Therese".

She was the author of novels, short stories and travelogues, wrote feature articles for Parisian newspapers and acted as anonymous editor of the letters between her friend Charlotte Diede and the scientist explorer Wilhelm von Humboldt.

== Early life ==
Therese was born into the family of Baltic-German nobility, as a daughter of Heinrich Christian Gottfried von Struve (1772-1851) and his wife, Countess Sophie Elisabeth Wilhelmine Oexle von Friedenberg (1780–1837).

== Biography ==
Born in Stuttgart, Therese was educated in Hamburg where her father served as Russian Minister-Resident.

As a young adult, she moved to Saint Petersburg, where she married the Russian Consul-General Robert Gabriel von Bacheracht (1798-1884). He was the father-in-law of Alexandrine von Hutten-Czapska, who was previously married to Louis IV, Grand Duke of Hesse. Later she divorced him and married Baron Heinrich von Lützow (1807-1879). Therese accompanied her second husband to Java, where she died.

== Works ==
Her chief publication is the correspondence between Wilhelm von Humboldt and her friend Charlotte Diede, under the title Briefe an eine Freundin von Wilhehn von Humboldt (1847; 12th ed. 1891). Her other works include society novels such as Lydia (1884) and Weltglück (1885), and several volumes of travel writing.
