= Smoląg, Pomeranian Voivodeship =

Village in Pomeranian Voivodeship, Poland

Smoląg
- Village
- Location within Poland
- Coordinates: 53°53′26″N 18°35′13″E
- Country: Poland
- Voivodeship: Pomeranian
- County: Starogard
- Gmina: Bobowo

Population
  - Total: 111
- Time zone: UTC+1 (CET)
  - Summer (DST): UTC+2 (CEST)
- Vehicle registration: GST

Smoląg [ˈsmɔlɔnk] is a village in the administrative district of Gmina Bobowo, within Starogard County, Pomeranian Voivodeship, in northern Poland. As of 2008, it has a population of 111. It is located in the ethnocultural region of Kociewie in the historic region of Pomerania.
