= Emeryk Hutten-Czapski Museum =

Coordinates: 50°03′36″N 19°55′48″E

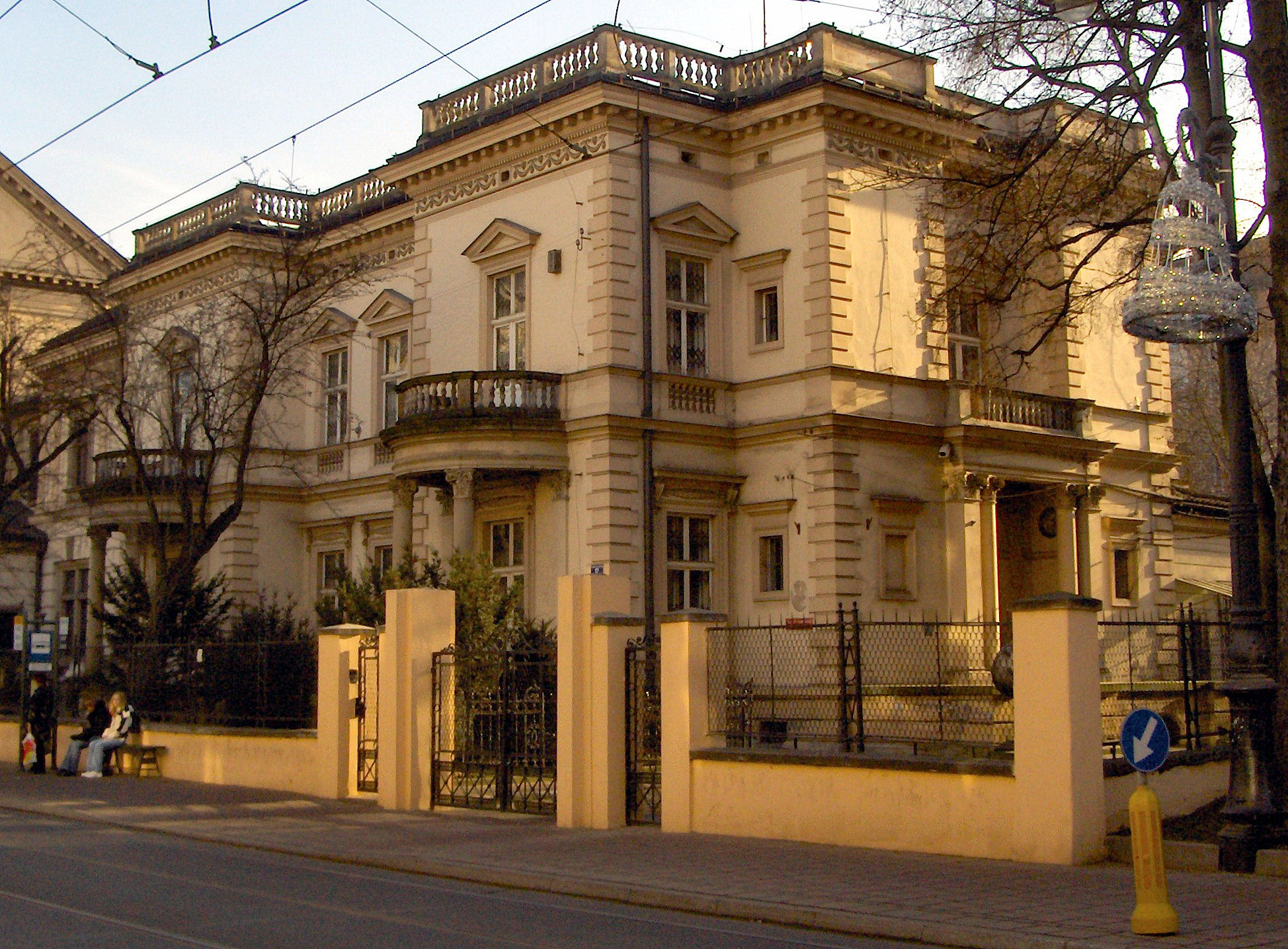
- Established: 1904
- Location: Kraków, Poland
- Type: National museum
- Curator: Dorota Malarczyk
- Website: Emeryk Hutten-Czapski Museum

The Emeryk Hutten-Czapski Museum (Polish: Muzeum im. Emeryka Hutten-Czapskiego), also known as the Czapski Museum (Polish: Muzeum Czapskich), is a branch of the National Museum of Kraków in Kraków, Poland.

Count Emeryk Hutten-Czapski (1828–1896) was a Vice-Governor of Saint Petersburg and an important collector of books, prints, and numismatics. He built his collection at his family estate in Stankow (today Stankava in Dzyarzhynsk district in Belarus). Fearing for the safety of the collection, being close to Russia, he moved the collection to Kraków. In 1894, he purchased a 19th-century palace, on what is today 12 Piłsudski Street, and built an addition to house his collection. He personally catalogued the collection. He died in 1896, before the addition was finished. His wife, Baroness Elzbieta Meyendorff, completed the construction of the addition, and in 1904, as per her husband's request, donated the collection to the city of Kraków. The museum displays the Czapski crest on the outside, along with the inscription on the pediment: "Monumentis Patriae Naufragio Ereptis" (Patriotic Monuments Saved from the Destruction of the Storm).

The collection originally contained more than 11,000 coins, medals, orders, prints and books. Upon the death of Bogdan Hutten-Czapski, a nephew of Emeryks, his large collection of books and prints was added to the museum library. The museum continually received generous donations from other coin collectors. Important donations came from Wiktor Wittyg, Zygmunt Zakrzewski, Franciszek Piekosinski, Karol Halama, Piotr Uminski and Konstanty Schmidt-Ciążyński, among others. At the outbreak of World War I, in 1914, the collection was stored in barrels. The museum was reopened in 1917 and once again at the outset of World War II, in 1939, was closed and the collection was again safeguarded. Since 1939 the museum remained closed to the public. With funding from the European Regional Development Fund of the European Economic Community the project of the European Centre of Numismatics in Kraków could be completed, and the restored museum and gardens were opened once again to the public in 2013. The museum has been renovated to a world class museum with touch screens throughout, explaining the different exhibits in Polish and English.

In April 2016, on the gardens of the museum, a pavilion was erected to commemorate Emeryk's grandson, Józef Czapski. Jozef was an eminent Polish intellectual, writer, painter and critic. The modern pavilion displays Czapski's diaries, paintings, and contains various multimedia presentations. The layout of the Pavilion's permanent exhibition was designed by Krystyna Zachwatowicz and her husband, the film director Andrzej Wajda.

== Bibliography ==
- Dedicated to the Relics of My Country Saved from the World's Storms; The Emeryk Hutten-Czapski Museum, By Kocojowa, Maria, Published by Wydawnictwo Literackie Kraków, 1978. English edition translated by Zofya Mohl and Therese Dayton.
- A Family of Central Europe: Through the Storm, by Maria Czapska; [translated from the French by Alasdair Lean], Published by Kraków; Buenos Aires: Wyd. Znak and Czapski Editors, 2014.
