= Emeryk August Hutten-Czapski =

Polish aristocrat

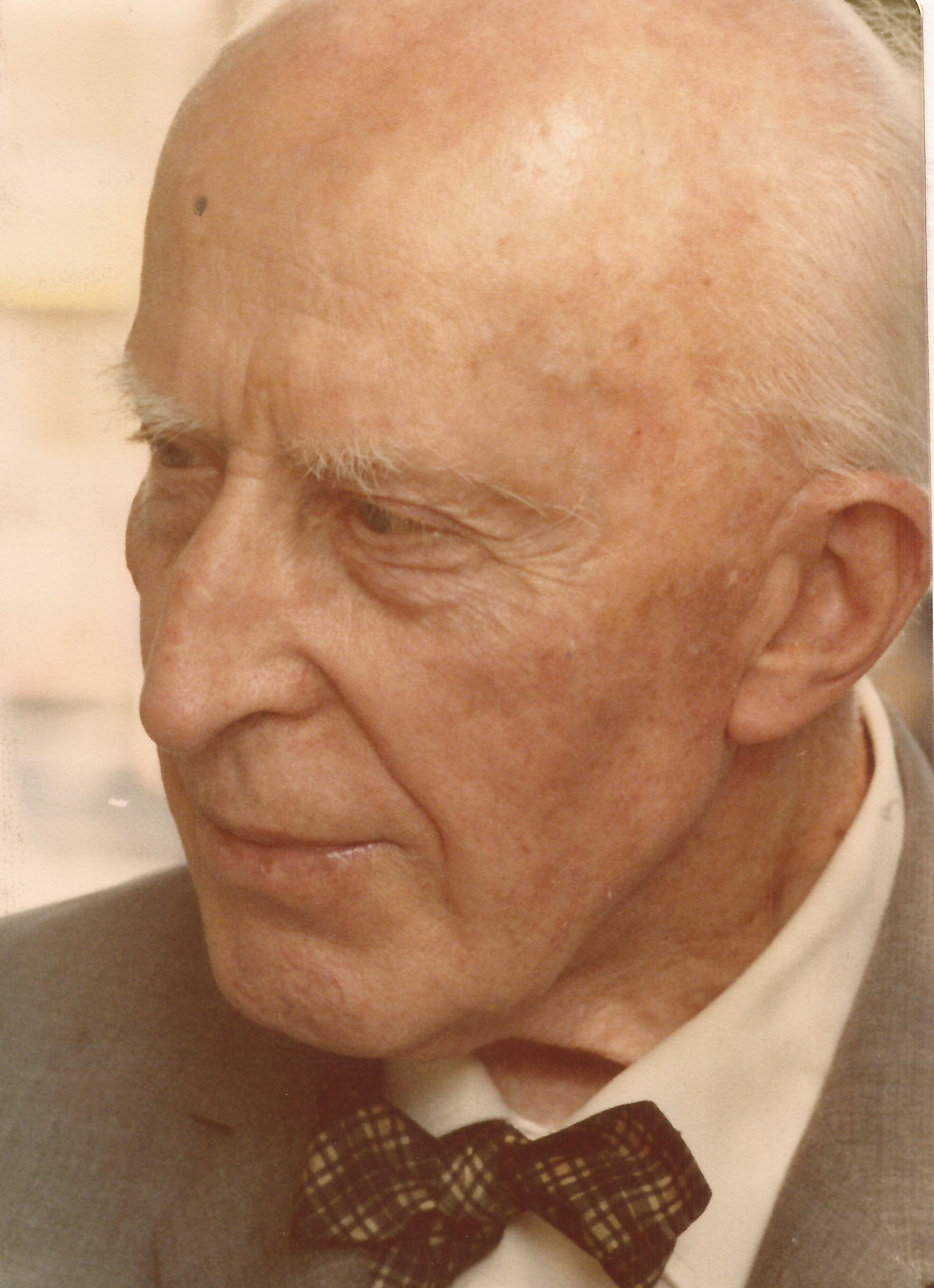
Count Emeryk Hutten-Czapski, Rome,1978

Emeryk August, Count Hutten-Czapski (21 August 1897 – 31 January 1979) was a Polish aristocrat, politician, military officer, diplomat and Bailiff of the Polish Sovereign Military Order of Malta.

Emeryk August Hutten-Czapski, descended from a long line of nobles who contributed much to Poland's political and cultural life. His father was Count Karol Hutten-Czapski (1860–1904), President of Minsk, and his mother was Maria Leontyna Pusłowska (1870–1965). His grandfather was Count Emeryk Hutten-Czapski, renowned collector and numismatist, founder of The Emeryk Hutten-Czapski Museum in Kraków. Emeryk was adopted by a second cousin twice removed, Count Bogdan Hutten-Czapski, who had no issue, was very wealthy, and was a prominent and controversial figure in Polish politics. Józef Czapski, the painter, and Maria Czapska, the writer, were his first cousins. Emeryk had two sisters: Elżbieta (1895–1930) married to Count Aleksander Piotr Mohl, and Fabianna (1895–1974), married to Józef Godlewski.

== Life before the War ==
Hutten-Czapski coat of arms

Hutten-Czapski lost his father in 1904, when he was seven years old. He was sent to boarding school at the Benedictine boarding school in Ettal, Bavaria, Germany. After graduation he studied law at the university in St Petersburg. In 1919 he worked for the Hoover Food Mission of the American Relief Administration in Warsaw, and in 1920 he was placed in charge of the religious and ethnic affairs of Minsk. After this he worked in administration at the headquarters of the Fourth Army under General Leonard Skierski. From 1921 to 1923 he was named Starosta of the town of Stowbtsy. In 1922 three bombs were thrown into his bedroom, only one exploded, and he survived the assassination attempt. He settled on his Synkowicze estate, near the district of Słonim. He was very active in community affairs. From 1925 to 1931 he was involved in the Landowners Association. From 1933 to 1939 he was adviser to the Board of Agriculture of Vilnius. He represented the Nowogródek Voivodeship, as deputy in the Sejm (Parliament), for two terms, between 1930 and 1935. He was involved in various other associations and economic trade delegations and commissions. He was accepted into the Polish Knights of Malta in 1932.

== Activities During the War ==
When the Russians invaded Poland on September 17, 1939, Hutten-Czapski fled to France, and worked with the Polish Government in Angers. When the Germans invaded France, Czapski became a delegate of the Polish Red Cross (1940–1943). He then moved to North Africa where he lent support to fleeing Polish soldiers trying to get to England, helped protect the Polish gold reserves that had been sent to Dakar, and headed the diplomatic mission in Algiers as Consul General until he was replaced by Kajetan Morowski. He was named Head of the Refugee Department. In 1943 he was transferred to London, to work for the Polish Ministry of Foreign Affairs. In 1944 he was promoted to lieutenant colonel in the army, and transferred as political adviser, to the Supreme Headquarters Allied Expeditionary Force. In 1945 he was embedded with the 2nd Regiment of the 1st Armoured Division (Poland) under the command of general Stanisław Maczek which fought in the Falaise Pocket and crossed the Rhine into Germany. He was part of the patrol that liberated the Polish women of the Home Army who had fought in the Warsaw Uprising, and were interned in the Oberlangen prison camp. For participating in this action he was awarded the Cross of Valour (Poland). He visited the Dachau, and the Mauthausen-Gusen concentration camps, and informed the Cardinal Primate, August Hlond, of the clergy that had survived. In Nuremberg he located the famous Veit Stoss altarpiece in Kraków, that had been stolen by the Germans from the St. Mary's Basilica, Kraków. He was named delegate to General Władysław Anders High Commission of the II Corps (Poland) in Italy, and when the war ended he settled in Rome.

== Rome ==
Hutten-Czapski helped many Polish soldiers, stranded in Italy, to get to England. In 1948, and until 1975, he served as President of the Polish Knights of Malta. He also served as Bailiff (chivalric orders), as well as Chancellor of the World Organization of the Order of Malta. Since 1968 he administered the Hospice of the Knights of Malta in Rome. He was chairman of a foundation which granted scholarships to Polish academics in the field of science. In 1972 he created a fund, which purchased all the marble required, to help with the reconstruction the Royal Castle in Warsaw. Czapski regularly attended mass at Santo Stanislao dei Polacchi. He was very close to the Holy See and knew Pope Pius XII, Pope John XXIII, Paul VI, and was friendly with Cardinal Karol Wojtyla, who became Pope Paul II, the first Polish Pope, a year before Emeryk passed away.

Like his grandfather, Hutten-Czapski was a great collector of Polonica. He constantly travelled around Europe visiting auction houses and antiquarians. He collected many items, principally related to Poland, and his passion was books, old maps and city views. He became a recognized collector, and he bequeathed to the Czpaski Museum in Cracow a collection of precious books and maps. Czapski made a two volume catalogue of his Polish map collection in 1978. After his death, his heirs sold his remaining collection of maps to the Polish state.

Hutten-Czapski died in January 1979. He was buried in the Prima Porta cemetery in Rome next to his mother, Maria Leontyna Czpaska, who had died in 1965.

== Decorations ==
- Gold Cross of Merit (Poland) (1944)
- Gold Cross of Merit with Swords (Poland)
- Cross of Valour (Poland) (1944),
- Grand Officer, Order of the Crown of Italy
- Knight, Order of the Crown of Italy
- Grand Officer of the Order of Merit of the Kingdom of Hungary
- Knight. Honor and Devotion Cross, Order of Malta (1933)
- Bailiff Grand Cross Honor and Devotion, Order of Malta (1946)
- Bailiff Knights Grand Cross in Obedience of the Order of Malta (1968)
- Grand Cross of the Order of St. Gregory the Great (Holy See, 1978)
- Sacred Military Constantinian Order of Saint George 1st class,
- Moroccan Order of Ouissam Alaouite Grand Officer
- Nischan-el-Iftikhar Order of Glory (Tunisia)

== Bibliography ==
- Memoires, Fabianna Godlewska, 1994. Edited by Marie-Christine and Karol Godlewski.
- A Family of Central Europe: Through the storm, Maria Czapska; [translated from the French by Alasdair Lean], Published by Kraków; Buenos Aires: Wyd. Znak and Czapski (eds.). ISBN 9788324029891.
- The Nobility of Poland, Puslowski Xavier Jon, 2011. CreateSpace Independent Publishing Platform. ISBN 9781456488338.
