= Jan Chryzostom Czapski =

Jan Chryzostom Czapski, coat of arms Leliwa, (born 1656, died 18 May 1716) was the Chamberlain of Malbork, Castellan of Kruszwica and later the Castellan of Elbląg.

Leliwa

== Governorship ==
Czapski was appointed as Castellan of Kruszwica by the King of Poland, John III Sobieski in 1693.

In 1699 he was appointed Castellan of Elbląg by Augustus II the Strong, the Imperial Vicar and elected King of Poland and Grand Duke of Lithuania and served from 1703 to 1716. He was in charge of two hospitals, and was commander of the royal infantry at his own expense. He was elected Marshall of the Pomeranian Voivodeship, and was remembered as a "memorable senator and respected by everyone".

Czapski participated in the Battle of Vienna.

== Family ==
Czapski was the son of Franciszek Miroslaw Czapski, chamberlain of Malbork County and Castellan of Gdańsk, and Zofia von Holt Guldenback. His brother Piotr Alexander was Castellan of Pomerania and Chelmno, and his brother Thomas Francis was Bishop Of Chelmno.

He was married to Ludwika Rudnicka (Nałęcz coat of arms). They had four daughters:

- Zofia who married a Kruszyński (Castellan of Gdańsk)
- Teresa who married a Pawłowski (standard-bearer of Malbork)
- Konstancja married a Dobrski (standard-bearer of Michałów)
- Ludwika who married a Stoliński.

They also had four sons: Adam, Franciszek, Ignacy and Jozef.

== Bibliography ==
- Polish Biographical Dictionary (Volume IV, p. 185)
