= Smogulec =

- Village
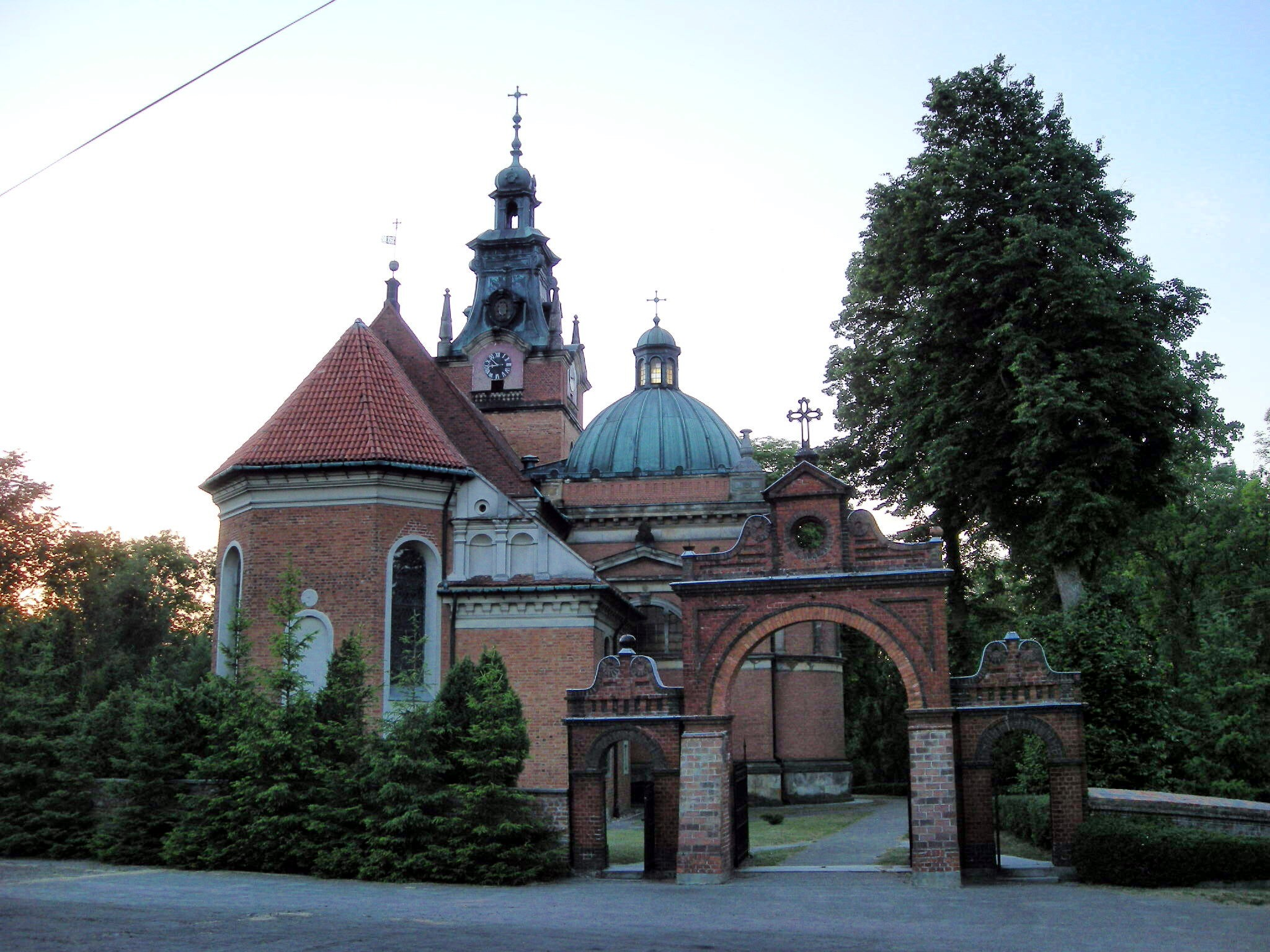
- Saint Catherine Church

- Location within Poland
- Coordinates: 53°2′N 17°20′E
- Country: Poland
- Voivodeship: Greater Poland
- County: Wągrowiec
- Gmina: Gołańcz

Population (approx.)
  - Total: 500

Smogulec [smɔˈɡulɛt͡s] is a village in the administrative district of Gmina Gołańcz, within Wągrowiec County, Greater Poland Voivodeship, in west-central Poland.

The village has an approximate population of 500.
