= Józef Czapski =

Polish artist (1896–1993)

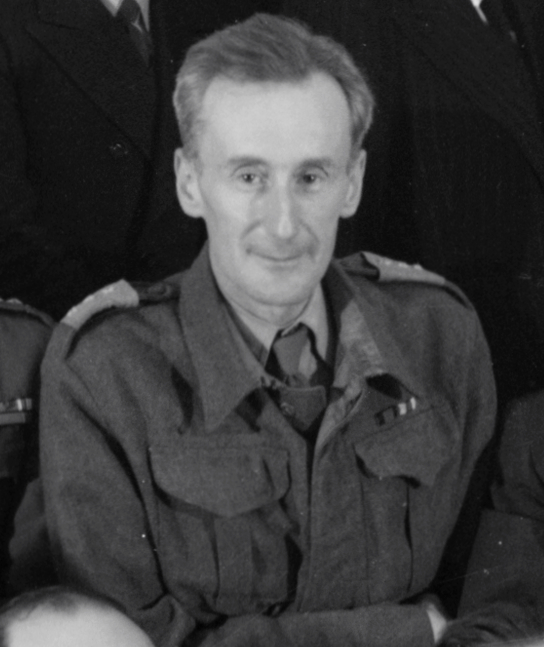
- Czapski in uniform, January 1943
- Born: 3 April 1896; Prague, Austria-Hungary
- Died: 12 January 1993 (aged 96); Maisons-Laffitte, France
- Occupations: artist, writer, critic
- Known for: co-creating Kultura monthly, survivorship and eyewitness testament of the Katyn massacre
- Notable work: The Inhuman Land, Lost Time: Lectures on Proust in a Soviet Prison Camp

Józef Czapski (3 April 1896 – 12 January 1993) was a Polish painter, author, and critic, as well as a major of the Polish Army reserves.

As a painter, he is notable for his membership in the Kapist movement, which was heavily influenced by Cézanne.

Following the Polish Defensive War, he was made a prisoner of war by the Soviets and was among the very few officers to survive the Katyn massacre of 1940. Following the Sikorski-Mayski Agreement, he was an official envoy of the Polish government in exile searching for the missing Polish officers in Russia.

After World War II, he remained in exile in the Paris suburb of Maisons-Laffitte, where he was among the founders of Kultura monthly, one of the most influential Polish cultural journals of the 20th century.

== Life ==
=== Early life ===
Leliwa

Józef Maria Franciszek count Hutten-Czapski of Leliwa, as was his full name, was born on 3 April 1896 in Prague, to an aristocratic family. His father was a landowner and conservative politician Jerzy Hutten-Czapski, and his mother was Józefa Thun-Hohenstein, daughter of Friedrich von Thun und Hohenstein, an Austrian diplomat. Among his relatives were count Emeryk Hutten-Czapski, count Karol Hutten-Czapski, count Emeryk August Hutten-Czapski, his sister Maria Czapska, as well as Georgy Chicherin. Czapski spent most of his childhood in his family's manor of Przyłuki near Minsk. In 1915 he graduated from a gymnasium in St. Petersburg and joined the cadet corps. Czapski graduated from the law faculty of the University of Saint Petersburg, and in 1917 both joined and later resigned from the 1st Krechowce Uhlan Regiment, a Polish cavalry unit formed in Russia as part of the Polish I Corps. He left the army because of his pacifist convictions and, together with friends and siblings, established a pacifist commune in revolutionary St. Petersburg. Following the Russian Revolution of 1917 he moved to newly-renascent Poland and in 1918 entered the Academy of Fine Arts in Warsaw. There he started his studies in the class of Stanisław Lentz. However, already in 1920 he quit the academy and volunteered for the Polish Army.

=== Polish-Soviet War ===
An ardent pacifist, Czapski asked for any service that would not involve active struggle. His plea was accepted and he was sent to Russia with a mission of finding the whereabouts of the officers of Czapski's former regiment, taken captive by the Bolsheviks in the course of the Russian Civil War. He reached St. Petersburg, where he met, among others, Dmitry Filosofov, Zinaida Gippius, Aleksey Remizov and Dmitry Merezhkovsky who later became his long-time friend. His mission was concluded when he found out that the officers had been executed by the Bolsheviks. Under Merezhkovsky's influence Czapski gave up his pacifist ideals and, upon his return to Poland, joined the ranks of the Polish Army and fought as an NCO in the crew of one of the armoured trains on the fronts of the Polish-Soviet War. For his merits he was awarded the Virtuti Militari, the highest Polish military decoration.

=== Paris Committee and Second World War ===
In 1921, Czapski entered the Academy of Fine Arts in Kraków, where he was taught by Wojciech Weiss and Józef Pankiewicz. Moving away from the classical tradition, he moved to Paris in 1924 where he helped to develop the Komitet Paryski (Paris Committee, subsequently abbreviated to the "Kapist" movement). Czapski began to hold exhibitions of his paintings and, encouraged by Ludwik Hering, also became a critic, writing essays on art, literature, and philosophy. In Paris he discovered Proust's À la recherche du temps perdu, which he read in French and wrote about in Polish. He returned to Poland in 1932, re-enlisting in 1939. He was subsequently captured by the Soviets and was successively interned in prison and labor camps in the USSR: Starobilsk, in eastern Ukraine, Pawliszczew Bor, in Smolensk Oblast, and Gryazovets, even further north, near the city of Vologda; here his love for Proust was crucial to his survival. In a barrack he lectured the internees with quotations from memory and this gave him the strength to overcome the extreme existential discomfort. He was one of 395 who avoided the fate of more than 20,000 murdered at Katyn and similar massacres.

After the 1941 German invasion of the Soviet Union and signing the Sikorski-Mayski Agreement, Czapski joined the Polish II Corps under the command of General Anders. Between 1941 and 1942, Czapski was tasked with investigating the disappearance of Poles who had been in the captivity of the NKVD and subsequently massacred. He never received any satisfactory answers as to the fate of these men, but wrote about his experiences in two books, Memories of Starobielsk (1944) and The Inhuman Land (1949). During that period Czapski also met Aleksey Nikolayevich Tolstoy and Anna Akhmatova who is said to have dedicated one of her poems to him.

Anders subsequently removed his army through the Persian Corridor, and in Baghdad Czapski began writing for the Polish army newspapers Orzeł Biały ('White Eagle') and Kurier Polski ('Polish Courier').

=== Emigration ===
Czapski shortly before his death, pictured on the cover of Tumult i olśnienia (Uproar and Enlightenments, originally published in French as Lumières de Joseph Czapski)

Czapski ended the war in Rome, and moved to France in 1946. Together with Maria Czapska, Gustaw Herling-Grudziński and Jerzy Giedroyc, he established the Instytut Literacki (Literary Institute) in Rome in 1946. The institute moved to Maisons-Laffitte in 1947, where Czapski lived until his death and contributed to the Polish émigré literary journal Kultura. He also published in the French press, including Le Figaro Littéraire, Preuves, Gavroche, Nova et Vetera, Carrefour. He co-organized the Congress for Cultural Freedom in Berlin (1950).

At first his major work, recounting his experiences in Soviet Russia during the Second World War, was not deemed worthy of publication by many French publishers because of its strongly anti-Stalinist stance, despite the support of André Malraux and Raymond Aron. It was finally published in 1949 under the title The Inhuman Land, thanks to Daniel Halévy, at the Éditions Self.

His paintings were exhibited in France, Switzerland, Great Britain, Brazil and Belgium. His works were virtually inaccessible in Poland – after Polish October he had 1957 exhibitions in National Museum in Poznań and Kraków Society of Friends of Fine Arts, but the next one was held only in 1986 in Warsaw.

He signed a letter of Polish émigré writers who supported the Letter of 59. The Polish People's Republic censored information about Czapski and had his name on a list of the people completely banned from publication. His literary and artistic works were popularized in Poland only after 1989. In 1990 he received the Jan Cybis Award.

Czapski died on 12 January 1993, and three days later was buried in a cemetery in Le Mesnil-le-Roi, by the side of his sister Maria, who died in 1981.

Czapski was awarded the Silver Cross of the Order of Virtuti Militari (1918–1920) and the Commander's Cross of the Order of Polonia Restituta (1990).

=== Private life ===
Czapski was homosexual. In the years 1924–1926 he entered a relationship with the poet Sergey Nabokov, younger brother of Vladimir Nabokov; it was ended by Czapski's departure to London, in order to cure his typhoid fever. Returning to Poland, Czapski met the writer Ludwik Hering. The pair lived together for a few years in Józefów, and despite the fact that they were separated by World War II and subsequent emigration of Czapski, they maintained the love for years by exchanging letters. Czapski was an ecumenical Catholic.

== English translations ==
The Inhuman Land is the first work of Czapski's translated into English and was published in London in 1951. Because it is a first-hand account of contemporaneous negotiations with the Soviets over the missing Polish officers it became an important document until Russian guilt for the massacres was acknowledged. In the post-war period Czapski was also among the eyewitnesses of the situation of Polish prisoners in Soviet captivity and testified on the matter before the United States Congress.

His Lost Time: Lectures on Proust in a Soviet Prison Camp was translated into English in 2018. Memories of Starobielsk was translated in 2022.

== The Jozef Czapski Pavilion ==
In 2016, the National Museum of Krakow inaugurated the Jozef Czapski Pavilion on the grounds of the Emeryk Hutten-Czapski Museum. The pavilion is dedicated to the grandson of the most important numismatic collector in Poland, and the permanent exhibition is about his life and work. The exhibition displays some of his diaries and paintings, as well as various multimedia presentations on his work and life. One of the exhibitions is an exact recreation of the room he lived in at the Kultura house in Maisons-Laffitte in France. The pavilion was designed by Krystyna Zachwatowicz and her husband, the film director, Andrzej Wajda.

== Selected solo exhibitions ==
- 1932: Galerie Vignon, Paris.
- 1951: Galerie Motte, Geneva.
- 1957: National Museum in Poznań.
- 1959: Grabowski Gallery, London.
- 1961: Czapski. Peintures, Galerie M. Bénezit, Paris.
- 1966: Galerie Jacques Desbrière, Paris.
- 1976: Galerie Plexus, Chexbres, Switzerland.
- 1978: Galerie Jean Briance, Paris.
- 1990: Musée Jenisch, Vevey.
- 1992: Józef Czapski, ses œuvres dans les collections en Suisse, National Museums in Warsaw, Kraków and Poznań.
- 1996: Wnętrze. Józef Czapski w stulecie urodzin, National Museum in Kraków.
- 2000: Józef Czapski. Widzenie życia, National Museum in Gdańsk.
- 2007: Józef Czapski. Autour de la collection Aeschlimann, Zachęta National Gallery of Art, Warsaw.
- 2016: Józef Czapski. Peintures, Polish Library in Paris.
- 2020: Józef Czapski. Peintre et écrivain, Fondation Jan Michalski, Montricher.
- 2026: Oblicza Czapskiego, National Museum in Kraków.
