= Bogdan Hutten-Czapski =

Polish politician

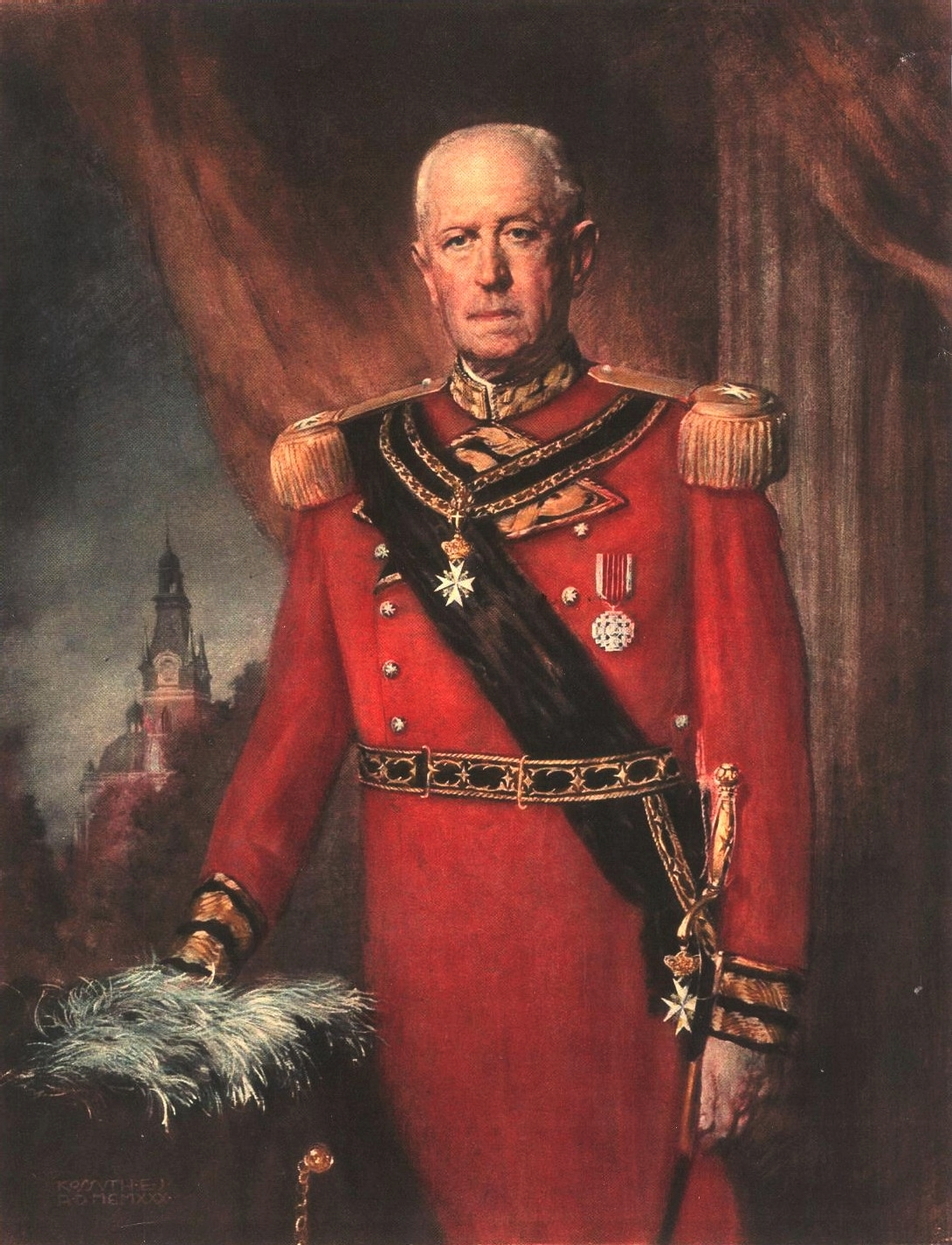
Bogdan Hutten-Czapski in Knight of Malta Uniform

Bogdan Franciszek Serwacy Hutten-Czapski (referred to in German contexts as Bogdan Graf von Hutten Czapski) h. Leliwa (b 13 May 1851 in Smogulec, d. 7 September 1937 in Poznań) was a Polish Count, politician, curator of the University of Warsaw and the Warsaw University of Technology, President of the Association of Polish Knights of Malta. Bogdan was the grandson of two Polish generals – Józef Grzegorz Longin Hutten-Czapski (1760–1810) and Stanisław Kostka Mielżyński (1778–1826), associate of Kaiser Wilhelm II, and servant of the Kingdom of Prussia until the end of WWI.

== Early life ==
Bogdan Czapski was born in Kreis Wongrowiec as the only son of Józef Napoleon Czapski (1797–1852) and Countess Eleonora (Laura) Mielzynska (1815–1875). Józef Napoleon Czapski was a colorful character, described by the historian Charles Forbes René de Montalembert as a "célèbre révolutionnaire". As a Lieutenant of the Polish army during the November Uprising, he was awarded for bravery, the Virtuti Militari 4th class. He supported revolutionairy activities in France, Germany and Ireland, travelling under different aliases. He died in 1852 from cholera when Bogdan was one year old. His mother, Countess Mielzynska, was from a wealthy family in German Poland and sent him to schools in Switzerland, Paris and Rome.

He graduated from the Lycée Bonaparte in Paris. Between 1862 and 1865 his mother, for health reasons, travelled frequently to Italy, where Bogdan as a small boy learned to speak Italian fluently. Countess Czapska would spend the summer seasons in resorts in Germany, mainly in Bad Schwalbach, where she befriended Augusta Victoria of Schleswig-Holstein, wife of the future king of Prussia and the German Emperor Wilhelm I. During the war years 1870–1871 Bogdan left France and went to Rome, where Pope Pius IX showed him kindness and friendship; Czapski was an eyewitness to the fall of the Papal States and voluntary announcement by the Pope as being a "prisoner of the Vatican." The relationships Czapski established in Rome, were very useful to him later in his "secret diplomacy" allowing him to mediate between the various chancellors of Imperial Germany and the Vatican.

In 1871 Czapski started studying law in Vienna, Berlin and Heidelberg, graduating in 1875.Emeryk August Hutten-Czapski Later he wanted to study medicine, but had to give up when he got into politics. He remained a lifelong member of the board of the German Anti-Cancer Society. During his studies he received an invitation to the imperial court of Wilhelm I and Augusta of Saxe-Weimar-Eisenach, who both knew him since childhood. The Emperor discouraged his legal career and advised him to join the army. In 1873, the twenty-two-year-old entered the Prussian army and served as a one-year volunteer with the 2nd Guards Dragoon Regiment in Berlin. Two years later, in August 1875, he was appointed reserve officer of this regiment. In the army Czapski faced the hostility of the powerful Field Marshal Alfred von Waldersee and all the officers' Junkers clique of Prussia, who did not allow Poles to higher ranks, so that after many years of service Czapski only reached the degree of Major of the hussars .

== Political life ==
Between 1882 and 1883 Bogdan was attached to the German Embassy in Paris From 1884 to 1885 he was Aide-de-Camp to Edwin von Manteuffel during his tenure as the governor of Alsace-Lorraine. He was then from 1885 to 1888 Brigade Adjutant in Hannover, and from 1888 to 1896 squadron Commander in Kassel. He served as Castellan of Posen, Member of the Prussian House of Lords, and unofficial aide and advisor to Chlodwig, Prince of Hohenlohe-Schillingsfürst. His personal friendship with Friedrich von Holstein and Prince Hohenlohe placed him in the centre of great politics. He was also a close associate of Otto von Bismarck. Czapski was one of the few politicians that in 1900 was shown Chief of Staff Count Alfred von Schlieffen´s plan to invade France through neutral Belgium. Because of his relationships in the Vatican, he was used permanently as an intermediary in ecclisiastical matters. He contributed to the appointment in 1891 of Archbishop Florian Stablewski of Gniezno and Poznan, and was sent on an unofficial mission to Rome regarding the occupation of the Prince-Bishopric of Strasbourg.

Named in 1895 as a hereditary member of the Prussian House of Lords, he left the army and devoted himself exclusively to parliamentary work. He was suitable for confidential missions in Italy like no one else because of his close relations with the long-time prime minister Giovanni Giolitti and the very influential Milanese banker Joël. In 1905 he organized a meeting between Giolitti and Bernhard von Bülow, and he sent very valuable reports to Berlin about his Roman talks. After the assassination of Archduke Franz Ferdinand, he carried out a mission to Romania to obtain from the king and the government a promise to keep allied commitments to the central states in case of war.

At the outbreak of the war, on 31 July 1914, the German Emperor (Kaiser), Wilhelm II said to him: "I have decided, if the God would grant us victory, to re-establish an independent Polish State". Wilhelm II further said to him "..an independent Polish state in alliance with which Germany will be, forever secured against Russia". Czapski reported the Polish clergy in Posen had received the news "with jubilation" and that the clergy, in their sermons, had urged the Poles to fight against the Russians. He later served in Eastern affairs in the political department of the General Staff., and he was instructed to promote insurrection in Russian held Poland. Assigned successively to the staffs of Generalfeldmarschall Paul von Hindenburg and field marshal August von Mackensen, he mediated between them and government in Berlin, as well as with the Polish society. He had also been requested to form a German Legion of Poles as Pilsudski had done in Austria, but after his request for similar concessions for the Poles that Pilsudski had achieved, this matter was dropped, and the recruited Poles joined the Pilsudski Legions. After the Battle of Tannenberg, on behalf of the emperor, on 23 December 1914, he delivered the Marshal's Baton to the victorious Hindenburg in Posen (Poznań) castle.

The occupation of Warsaw in August 1915 bound him to the end of the war with Polish affairs. Governor-General Hans Hartwig von Beseler, reopened the Warsaw University and the Warsaw Technical University, naming Czapski curator of both institutions. Czapski was an advocate of establishing the Polish state as soon as possible, which would include the Vilnius region and Minsk. During a visit to Warsaw in February 1916, Kaiser Wilhelm reiterated to Czapski, in detail, his plans to make Poland an independent state. He used all his influence to prevent the premature announcement of recruitment of three divisions of Polish volunteers for use by the Central Powers. He was a government commissioner at this institution, as well as at the later Regency Council. He was appointed as a secret counselor, but his reports were not given to Berlin, and his activities had to be limited to mitigate frictions on the spot. He tried to prevent Józef Piłsudski from being arrested, but this situation caused a certain mistrust between him and Beseleer. After the end of the war he left for his Smogulecka Wieś estate in Poznań on 24 November 1918.

== Life after the War ==
After the resurrection of the Polish State, he became a Polish citizen. He said "I cannot be a Polish citizen while there is no Polish state". He began managing his large estates, formerly under Prussian rule, which included Smogulecka Wieś, inherited from his mother. He was virulently opposed to Józef Piłsudski, of whom he said: " He is totally irresponsible...I wanted to negotiate on this affairs of the legions, and what do you think he said? I am the legend. Can one speak to such a man!" He maintained social relations with his former superiors and friends, but was loyal to the state he became a citizen of. An example of this was when in 1924, he created a foundation in Smogulecka Wieś, approved by the state authorities in 1930, for the promotion of Polish science. In recognition of the merits for the establishment of Warsaw's higher research institutes, the Warsaw University and the Warsaw University of Technology, bestowed upon him the distinction of doctor honoris causa. In November 1933, Ignacy Mościcki, The President of the Republic, awarded Bogdan the Polish Order of Polonia Restituta, Commanders Cross with Star. In the last years of his life he devoted himself to the drafting of his memoirs and the Polish Association of the Sovereign Military Order of Malta, of which he was president since 1926. He died in Poznań on 7 September 1937 and was buried next to his parents in the crypt of the Smogulecki church. Though a very controversial figure, because of his ties with the Germans and Prussians, there was no doubt that Bogdan Hutten-Czapski considered himself a Polish patriot. Though he never married, he named Emeryk August Hutten-Czapski, a distant nephew from the Llituanian Czpaski branch as his heir, who would follow in his footsteps by being very involved with Polish politics, the Vatican and the Knights of Malta.

His book of recollections - "Sechzig Jahre Politik und Gesellschaft" ("Sixty Years in Political and Social Life") was published in Berlin in 1936.

== Awards ==
- Order of Polonia Restituta Commanders Cross with Star
- Venerable Bailiff Knights Grand Cross of Justice Professed of Solemn Vows
- Knight Grand Cross in Obedience of the Order of Malta
- Order of St. Gregory the Great Grand Cross of the Order of St. Gregory the Great
- Order of the Crown of Italy Commander Cross
- Order of Glory (Tunisia) Commander Cross
- Order of the Red Eagle Knight's Cross
- French Legion of Honor Knight's Cross
- Saxe-Ernestine House Order, Knight's Cross
- Order of Franz Joseph, Knight's Cross
- Marian Cross (Teutonic Order)
