= Maria Czapska =

Polish writer

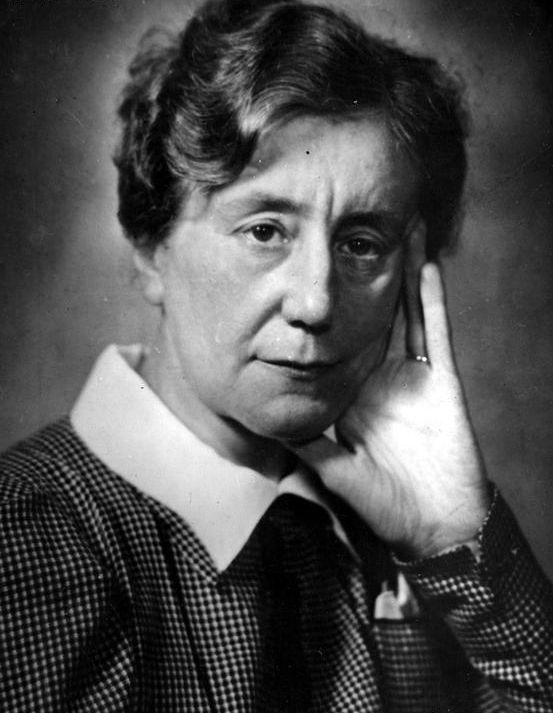
- Czapska in 1939
- Born: Maria Dorota Leopoldyna Czapska; 6 February 1894; Prague, Bohemia, Austria-Hungary
- Died: 11 June 1981 (aged 87); Maisons-Laffitte, France
- Occupations: Writer; essayist; historian
- Organizations: Żegota; Polish Society of Arts and Sciences Abroad
- Relatives: Józef Czapski

Maria Dorota Leopoldyna Czapska (6 February 1894 – 11 June 1981) was a Polish writer, essayist and historian.

== Life ==
Czapska was born in Prague to Count Jerzy Hutten-Czapski (1861–1930), and Jozefina Thun-Hohenstein (1867–1903), and grew up in Przyłuki, the family estate near Minsk. Her younger brother was Józef Czapski, and her relatives included Counts Emeryk Hutten-Czapski, Emeryk August Hutten-Czapski, and Karol Hutten-Czapski.

Czapska studied in Kraków from 1921 to 1925, and moved to Paris afterwards, spending the next five years there writing a biography of Adam Mickiewicz. The biography, La vie de Mickiewicz, published in 1931, was used for a time as a source in establishing Mickiewicz's ethnicity and origin, which remains under speculation. In 1938 she published her second work, Ludwika Śniadecka, and received the literary prize "Wiadomości Literackich" for her efforts the following year.

During World War II, Czapska lived in Poland, and during this time was a member of The Council to Aid Jews, or Żegota. This led to her crossing the green border and moving to France in 1945, where she lived the rest of her life. For a short time, Czapska helped with the startup of Tygodnik Powszechny, and after moving to France she worked on Kultura, a Polish exile magazine. She was also a member of Polish Society of Arts and Sciences Abroad. During her time in exile, her works were subject to censorship, which was discovered after Tomasz Strzyżewski defected to Sweden, publishing the information which noted her name among many others. Later in life, she focused on literary works, namely Dwugłos wspomnień, Europa w rodzinie, and Czas odmieniony. In 2014 two of her books, A Family of Central Europe and Through the Storm were published in one book for the first time in English.

== Works ==
- La vie de Mickiewicz, Paris, 1931
- Ludwika Śniadecka, Kraków, 1938
- Szkice mickiewiczowskie, London, 1963
- Polacy w ZSRR (1939-1942) (antologia), Paris, 1963
- Dwugłos wspomnień (pisane z bratem), London, 1965
- Europa w rodzinie, Paris, 1970
- Une Famille d´Europe Centrale, Paris, 1972
- Czas odmieniony, Paris, 1978
- Gwiazda Dawida, London, 1975
- Ostatnie odwiedziny i inne szkice, Warsaw, 2006
- Une Famille d´Europe Centrale, Paris, 2013
- A Family of Central Europe and Through the Storm, Buenos Aires and Kraków, 2014
