= Emeryk Hutten-Czapski =

Polish noble, scholar, and numismatist

Emeryk Hutten-Czapski CoA Leliwa, 1874
- Engraving by W.A. Bobrow, 1876
- Born: 17 October 1828; Stankava, Russian Empire (today Dzyarzhynsk Raion, Minsk Oblast, Belarus)
- Died: 23 July 1896 (aged 67); Kraków, Austria-Hungary
- Spouse: Elżbieta Karolina von Meyendorff
- Children: Zofia, Karol, Jerzy, Elżbieta
- Parent(s): Karol Czapski, Fabianna Obuchowiczówna

Emeryk Hutten-Czapski (Belarusian: Эмерык Гутэн-Чапскі), Leliwa coat of arms (17 October 1828 – 23 July 1896) was a Polish Count, scholar, ardent historical collector and numismatist.

Hutten-Czapski was born Emeryk Zachariasz Mikołaj Hutten-Czapski in the town of Stańkava (Polish: Stańków) near Minsk (today Belarus, then in Minsk Governorate of the Russian Empire, formerly the Lithuanian part of the partitioned Poland). His parents were Count Karol Hutten-Czapski (1777-1836) and Fabianna Obuchowicz h. Jasieńczyk (1775-1836). He was the grandson of Franciszek Stanisław Kostka Hutten-Czapski (1725-1802), the last voivode of Chełmno during the First Republic, who inherited parts of the Radziwiłł property in Belarus (including Stańkava) and in Volhynia and moved there from the former Royal Prussia.

== Career ==
Thanks to his aristocratic background, Emeryk Czapski spoke several languages including Polish, French, German and Russian, and knew Greek and Latin. After studying in St. Petersburg Czapski entered the Russian civil service where he had reached high administrative positions: from Chamberlain of the Court, the Secret State Counsel (1863–1864), Governor of Great Novgorod, the General manager of the Forest Department in the Ministry of the Russian State Property, and finally the Deputy Governor of St. Petersburg in 1865. In 1874, the Tsarist authorities recognized his Count title "Hutten" given to his ancestors (of the Rzewuski family line) 100 years earlier.

Hutten-Czapski left the civil service in 1879 and settled into his estate in Stańkava. Over the following years he gathered an unsurpassed collection of Russian and Polish coins, medals and orders, banknotes, Russian and Polish engravings, militaria including suits of armour, glasswork, textiles, oil paintings, and old prints. The items were obtained mainly through purchasing the collections of other magnates including Zygmunt Czarnecki, Natalia Kicka, Leon Skórzewski, Kazimierz Stronczyński, Leon Zwoliński, and Władysław Morsztyn. In 1885, Emeryk sold his very important collection of some 900 rare Russian coins to Grand Duke George Mikhailovich of Russia, who was one of the great coin collectors of his days. Emeryk used the proceeds to expand his collection of Polish coins.

Hutten-Czapski coat of arms

== Contribution to National Museum of Poland ==
In 1894 Czapski moved, with his vast collections, to the royal city of Kraków in the Austrian Partition, a center of culture and art known frequently as the "Polish Athens" – where Polish was the language of local government. After his untimely death in 1896, his widow donated his collections to the city in 1903 along with the palace he bought in 1894 specifically for that purpose, thus launching the Emeryk Hutten-Czapski Museum in Kraków (located on ul. Pilsudskiego 12). It is a division of the National Museum at present. His five-volume work about the Polish coins is still the basic source-material today for Polish coin collecting. In 2016, on the grounds of The Emeryk Hutten-Czapski Museum, the National Museum dedicated a new pavilion to Emeryk's grandson, the painter, Józef Czapski.

== Private life ==
Count Emeryk Hutten-Czapski was married to Elżbieta Karolina von Meyendorff (1833–1916) and had four children with her: Zofia (1857-1911), Karol Hutten-Czapski (1860–1904, president of Minsk), Jerzy (1861–1930) and Elżbieta (1867-1877). He was buried in Kraków, at the historic Rakowicki Cemetery in July 1896. Besides his grandson Jozef Czapski, also Josef's sister Maria Czapska, was a writer of importance. Another grandson was Emeryk August Hutten-Czapski, politician, military officer, diplomat and Bailiff of the Polish Sovereign Military Order of Malta. One of his great-granddaughters was painter Izabella Godlewska.
