= Karol Hutten-Czapski =

Polish philanthropist and politician (1860–1904)

- Караль Чапскі
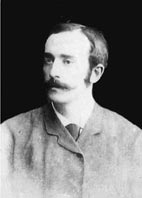

Mayor of Minsk
- In office 1890–1901

Personal details
- Born: Karol Jan Alexander Hutten-Czapski; 15 August 1860 Stankava, Minsk Governorate, Russian Empire (now Belarus)
- Died: 30 January 1904 (aged 43) Frankfurt, Kingdom of Prussia, German Empire (now Hesse, Germany)
- Relations: Czapski family

Count Karol Jan Alexander Hutten-Czapski (Note: Belarusian: Караль Эмерыкавіч Чапскі, romanized: Karal Emierykavich Chapski; Russian: Карл Эмерикович Чапский, romanized: Karl Emerikovich Chapsky) (Belarusian: Karaĺ Emierykavič Čápski; 15 August 1860 – 30 January 1904) was a Polish philanthropist. He was Mayor of Minsk between 1890 and 1901.

== Family ==
Karol Czapski came from an important aristocratic Polish family. He was the eldest son of Count Emeryk Hutten-Czapski, a well-known collector and numismatist, and Baroness Elizabeth Meyendorff. He was the great-grandson of Franciszek Stanisław Hutten-Czapski, the last governor of Chełmno during the First Republic, who inherited parts of the Radziwiłł property in Belarus and in Volhynia and moved there from the former Royal Prussia. Karol's mother was the daughter of Baron Georges Conrad Walter von Meyendorff (1795–1863) and Countess Sophie Stackelberg (1806–1891). Her father, at the service of Tsar Alexander I, participated in the Napoleonic war as a Colonel, and as a diplomat and explorer, travelling extensively to Central Asia, publishing a book: "Voyage d’Orenbourg à Boukhara fait en 1820". Paris, 1826.

== Early life and career ==
Karol was taught at the Stankava family estate near Minsk (now in the Dzyarzhynsk District of Belarus), and then was enrolled in the German grammar school Annenschule in Saint Petersburg, where he graduated in 1878. He studied political economics and statistics at the University of Tartu and graduated in 1882. His father Emeric worked in the Russian civil service and also was organizing and cataloging his large numismatic collection, so Karol at age twenty two began administrating the family properties, one of the largest in the province of Minsk. The properties included 40,000 hectares of agricultural land, forests, mills, wood distilleries, distilleries of alcohol, brickyards, and orchards. They also owned a large brewery which continues active today. In 1886 he started working in the Ministry of Finance as a collegiate secretary, rising to the rank of court counsellor in 1900.

== Mayor of Minsk ==
=== First mandate (1890-1893) ===
In 1890 he was elected President of Minsk for his first term. He finalized the construction of the Municipal Theatre(today the Janka Kupala National Theatre). In his first year the telephone was brought to Minsk, and a public telephone system was installed. In 1892, a tram pulled by horses was introduced. He built shelters for the homeless. He implemented a system for urban growth control and building approvals. He created a Health Committee, and in 1893 had a bridge built over the Svislach river. He created a series of ditches and walls to ease flooding, a usual problem in Minsk.

=== Second mandate (1893-1897) ===
During his second mandate, he renounced his state salary and continued his reforms. He created various schools, approved a new plan for the city (which began a period of rapid expansion), built a maternity ward, and created a credit institution for mortgages. He established insurance for agriculture, and the creation of a municipal slaughterhouse. He improved the sewer systems. He created a modern urban water supply system. In commemoration of the installation of the water supply, a fountain featuring a boy with a sawn was created. He established pawn shops, so that the poor were able to raise credit. He established a sports society and created a bicycle track around the main park. In 1894 the first power generator was installed.

=== Third mandate (1897-1901) ===
He began his third and last mandate, with a new urban plan. He opened a second school for women. In 1900 the Minsk Public Library was inaugurated. He improved the roads and pavements. He founded two newspapers, the "Minsk Provincial Newspaper" and the "Minsk Paper". In 1898 a hospital for prostitutes was opened. While serving as President of Minsk he lived on his estate in Stankow and went regularly on horseback to Minsk, regardless of the weather. He continued managing the family properties, establishing a hospital for infectious diseases for the employees of the estate. Many of the projects for the city were financed from his own resources, which was not without great prejudice to the family finances. Because of the great effort in both managing his family properties and serving as President of Minsk, he weakened and fell ill. He spent some time at a sanatorium in Baden, Germany. When he returned he founded a society for the protection of women. In 1901 he organized in Minsk an industrial and agricultural fair. He participated in the fair, showing thoroughbred cattle, pedigree horses and dogs, as well as bricks and ceramics, all coming from his Stankow estate.

Karol had to resign because of health reasons in 1901, and in 1904 he died of tuberculosis, in Frankfurt, Germany. During his eleven years as president, Minsk underwent the period of its greatest economic and cultural growth. He contributed greatly in modernizing the city. He put all his personal strength as well as his finances to develop and transform Minsk. Thanks to his efforts, it became a "European" city, in terms of buildings, services, amenities, industrialization and culture. Being an aristocrat, after Belarus came under Soviet influence, Czapski was seen as the "enemy" and largely forgotten. Today there is a resurgence of recognition for his work and a street has been named after him.

== Beer distillery ==
In 1893 Hutten-Czapski bought a beer brewery, which was named "Steam brewery Bohemia of Count Czpaski". He built a new building, installed new equipment, electricity, and as well as a steam engine and boiler. In 1896 the brewery was distinguished with a medal at a Russian Fair in Novgorod. When Karol fell ill towards the end of 1899, he sold the brewery. Today the Carlsberg Group is the majority share owner of the brewery. In 2014 In honor of its founder, on his birthday, a plaque was dedicated to Karol Czapski and an exhibition was held that hosted the Czapski Cup featuring historic beer labels and corks from private collections.

== Private life ==
In July 1894 he married Maria ("Marichette") Leontyna Pusłowska (1870–1965). They had four children: Fabianna, Elzbieta, Emeryk August Hutten-Czapski, (Member of Parliament 1930–1938), and Wojciech.

== Decorations ==
- Russian Imperial Order of St. Anna, Third Class (1895)
- Order of Saint Stanislaus (House of Romanov), Second Class(1896)

== Bibliography ==
- Polish Biographical Dictionary, Volume IV, Kraków 1938, pp 190–191
- "Memoires", By Fabianna Godlewska, 1994, Edited by Marie-Christine and Karol Godlewski
- "A Family of Central Europe : Through the Storm", by Maria Czapska; [translated from the French by Alasdair Lean], Published by Kraków; Buenos Aires : Wyd. Znak and Czapski Editors, 2014
