= Franciszek Stanisław Hutten-Czapski =

Polish Count and Senator

Franciszek Stanislaw Kostka Hutten-Czapski, Leliwa coat of arms (b. 1725, d. 9 April 1802 in Warsaw) - Count, Polish Senator, the last Governor of Chelmno (25 June 1766 – 9 April 1802), Member of the Bar Confederation. Knight of the Order of the White Eagle (Poland)(1762). An exhibition at the Royal Castle, Warsaw between November 9, 2005 and January 31, 2006, exhibited what was purported to be Franciszeks Order of the White Eagle, donated to the National Museum, Kraków by Emeryk Hutten-Czapski.

Son of Ignatius Czapski (1700–1746) (Governor of Gdańsk) and Teofila Konopacka (1680–1733) and heir to the family estate in Rynkówka.

== Governor of Chelmno ==
Franciszek Stanislaw Kostka Hutten-Czapski was originally from Royal Prussia, (a part of Poland until its partition in 1772). In those days “The Czapskis were looked on as the first patrician family of Pomerania,” wrote Józef Wybicki, friend and co-senator of Czapski. "They did not reign over us as did the Radziwiłłs, Czartoryskis, Potockis, etc., in other provinces where these magnates paid, protected, and commanded. The Czapskis were not so rich as to subsidize us, and we others, the Prussians, living as ever in our traditional simplicity, had no need to sell out. They were really our elder brothers in the midst of a modest, united family, and it is because of this that they came to occupy their place of honor in public affairs.” Czapski was Chamberlain of Rynkówka in 1752, then Castellan in 1762 and in 1766 became Governor of the Chełmno Voivodeship (1466–1793) until his death in 1802. He was the last Voivode in Chełmno (Culm).

== Bar Confederation and Radziwill marriage ==
Czapski joined the Bar Confederation in 1768 and helped arm some 12,000 men in the area of the city of Gdańsk. He also started a clandestine coalition (Unio Animorum) to unite the three Voivodeships of Polish Prussia. Franciszek was a supporter and a close friend of Prince Karol Stanisław "Panie Kochanku" Radziwiłł, one of the most colorful figures of that era. When the Confederation fell, Czapski and Radziwiłł fled Poland to Frankfurt. In Frankfurt, Czapski, then 47 years old, entered into a marriage contract with Prince Radziwill¨s half sister, Princess Veronika Joanna Radziwill (b. 1754), who was 18 at the time. The marriage contract was officially signed on 1 May 1780 in Nesvizh Castle. This was Czapski's third marriage.

== Senator ==
Czapski lost his estates with the first partition of Poland in 1772. Though he lived in reduced circumstances in Warsaw, he never actively pursued his right to a substantial dowry from his marriage to Veronika Radziwiłł. He was an active Senator publishing numerous senatorial speeches and pamphlets. He thought the serfs had to be helped to rise above their "boorishness and filth" because their "..soul is as worthy of respect as the most exalted nobleman". Regarding the Jews he accused them of "sapping the lifeblood of the Polish people and driving them to penury by every possible means." He thought the nobility should see themselves in "the looking glass of virtue, of honor and conscience", and not "reflect false colors, which would disfigure them..." Though his wife Veronica was to bring to their marriage a very important dowry, this was still not paid at the time of Czapski's death in 1802.

== Dowry ==
Upon Czapski's death, Veronika began a lawsuit against her nephew Prince Dominik Hieronim Radziwiłł, for payment of her dowry. After a long judicial process, Veronika and her two sons, Karol and Stansilaw finally received their inheritance in 1811. This large dowry included 2 million rubles and for the eldest son Karol the property of Stankow(now Stańkava), and properties in the province of Oszmianski; Zuprany, Nowosiolki and Skirdzimy and the villages that went with them. Stanislaw received the properties of Lakhva and Kėdainiai. Veronika lived in Wiasyn, near Stankow, which she received for life. This dowry greatly increased the fortunes of the Czapski family and would later help finance their political and collecting activities for various generations.

== Private life ==
Czapski married three times: first to Countess Dorota Dzialynska Ogonczyk, then to Zofia Mielzynska and finally to Princess Veronika Radziwill. He had six children, two of which were Karol Czapski(1787–1876) and Stanislaw Czapski(1797–1866)

== Bibliography ==
Polish Dictionary Biograficzny (Polish Biographical Dictionary) Vol. 4 p. 183 Czapski Franciszek Stanisław (d. 1802) voevoda chełmiński
