= List of twin towns and sister cities in Russia =

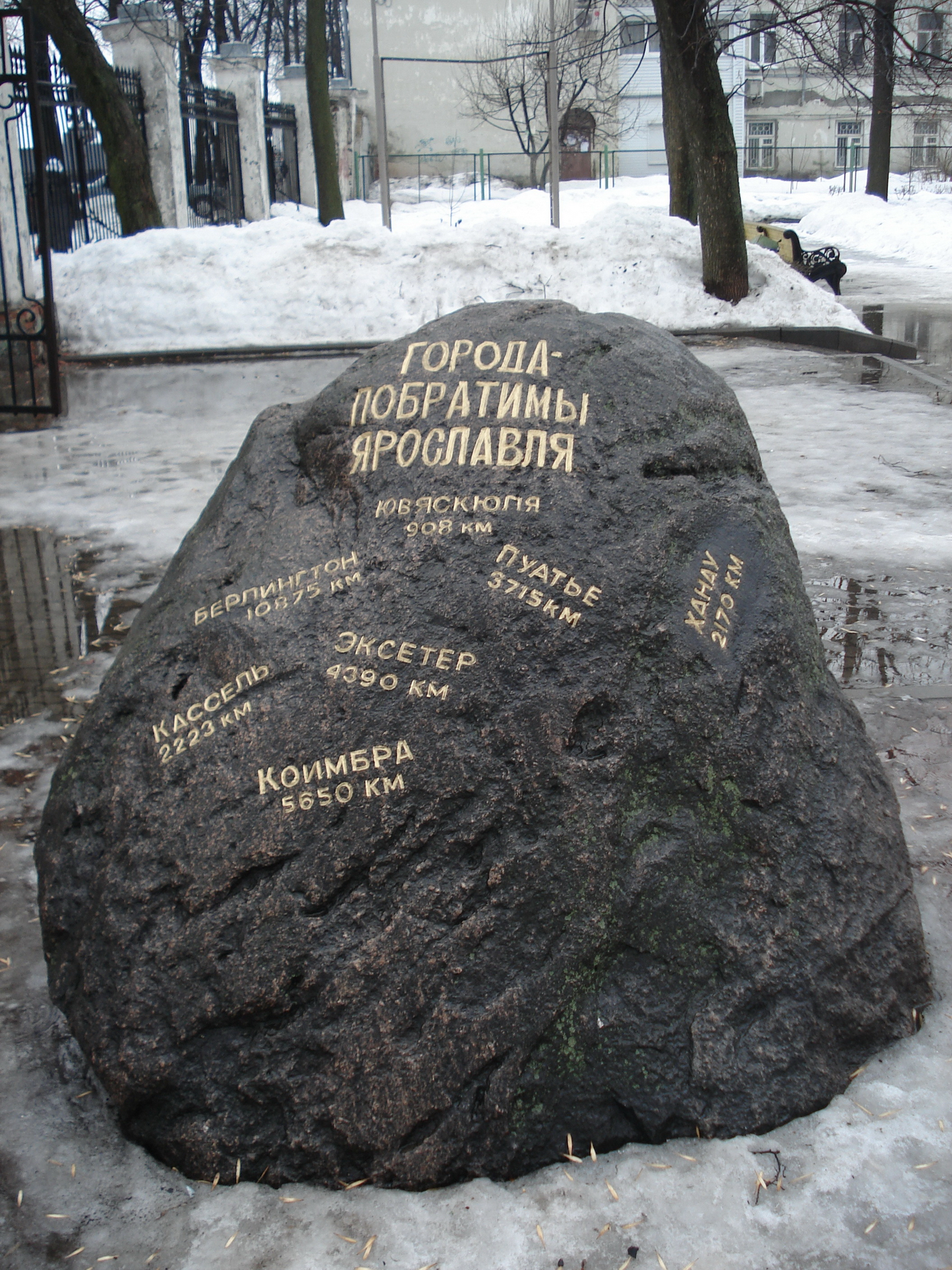
Twin towns memorial in Yaroslavl

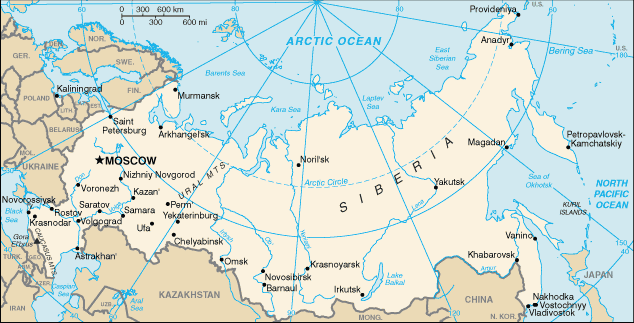
Map of Russia

This is a list of places in Russia which have standing links to local communities in other countries known as "town twinning" (usually in Europe) or "sister cities" (usually in the rest of the world).

== A ==
Aleksin

- Saky, Ukraine
- Salihorsk, Belarus
- Serpukhov, Russia
- Tivat, Montenegro
- Veľký Krtíš, Slovakia
- Yevpatoria, Ukraine

Arkhangelsk

- Ashdod, Israel
- Emden, Germany
- Jermuk, Armenia
- Oulu, Finland
- Portland, United States
- (Georgia (country)) Sukhumi, Georgia
- Vardø, Norway

Apatity

- Alta, Norway
- Boden, Sweden
- Keminmaa, Finland

Armavir

- Armavir, Armenia
- Feodosia, Ukraine
- Gomel, Belarus

Astrakhan

- Ahmedabad, India
- Brest, Belarus
- Grand-Popo, Benin
- Mogilev, Belarus
- Pembroke Pines, United States
- Rasht, Iran
- Sari, Iran
- Türkmenbaşy, Turkmenistan
- Vitebsk, Belarus

Azov

- Aglandjia, Cyprus
- Bijeljina, Bosnia and Herzegovina
- Chillicothe, United States
- Courbevoie, France
- Feodosia, Ukraine
- Pylos-Nestor, Greece
- Sečanj, Serbia

== B ==
Balakovo

- Cherepovets, Russia
- Trnava, Slovakia

Balashikha

- Martin, Slovakia
- Mogilev, Belarus
- Pernik, Bulgaria
- Yangzhou, China

Barnaul

- Baicheng, China
- Changji, China
- Oskemen, Kazakhstan
- Shumen, Bulgaria

Belgorod

- Herne, Germany
- Niš, Serbia
- Pryluky, Ukraine
- Sevastopol, Ukraine
- Yevpatoria, Ukraine

Birobidzhan

- Beaverton, United States
- Hegang, China
- Ma'alot-Tarshiha, Israel
- Niigata, Japan
- Nof HaGalil, Israel
- Yichun, China

Borisoglebsk

- Delmenhorst, Germany

Bryansk

- (Moldova) Comrat, Moldavia
- Dupnitsa, Bulgaria
- Gomel, Belarus
- Karlovo, Bulgaria

== C ==
Cheboksary

- Afyonkarahisar, Turkey
- Anqing, China
- Eger, Hungary
- Grodno, Belarus
- Rundu, Namibia
- Santa Clara, Cuba

Chelyabinsk

- Columbia, United States
- Mogilev, Belarus
- Nottinghamshire, England, United Kingdom
- Ürümqi, China

Cherepovets

- Aiud, Romania
- Balakovo, Russia
- Gorna Oryahovitsa, Bulgaria
- Liaoyuan, China
- Maladzyechna, Belarus
- Montclair, United States

Chernyakhovsk

- Kirchheimbolanden, Germany
- Salihorsk, Belarus

Chita

- Choibalsan, Mongolia
- Hailar (Hulunbuir), China
- Hulunbuir, China
- Manzhouli, China
- Ulan-Ude, Russia

== D ==
Derbent

- Ganja, Azerbaijan
- Hadera, Israel
- Yakima, United States

Dimitrovgrad

- Dimitrovgrad, Bulgaria
- Guliston, Tajikistan
- Lida, Belarus

Dmitrov

- Flevoland, Netherlands
- Osimo, Italy
- (Georgia (country)) Pitsunda, Georgia
- Puchavichy District, Belarus
- Rems-Murr (district), Germany
- Rēzekne, Latvia
- Rîbnița, Moldova

Dubna

- Alushta, Ukraine
- Giv'at Shmuel, Israel
- Kurchatov, Kazakhstan
- La Crosse, United States
- Lincang, China
- Nová Dubnica, Slovakia

Dzerzhinsk

- Bitterfeld-Wolfen, Germany
- Grodno, Belarus

== E ==
Elista

- Aktau, Kazakhstan
- (Georgia (country)) Khoni, Georgia
- Kyzyl, Russia
- Lhasa, China
- Ulaanbaatar, Mongolia
- Ulan-Ude, Russia

== G ==
Gagarin

- Barysaw, Belarus
- Krupki, Belarus
- Orsha, Belarus
- Ratingen, Germany

Gatchina

- Ettlingen, Germany

Gatchinsky District

- Lichuan County, China
- Nyasvizh, Belarus

Gelendzhik

- Angoulême, France
- Ayia Napa, Cyprus
- Hildesheim, Germany
- Kallithea, Greece
- Netanya, Israel
- Vitebsk, Belarus

Grozny

- Ardahan, Turkey
- Babruysk, Belarus
- Mogilev, Belarus
- Ulan-Ude, Russia
- Yalta, Ukraine

Guryevsk

- Chachersk, Belarus
- Jonkowo, Poland
- Nowe Miasto Lubawskie, Poland
- Olsztyn County, Poland
- Ostaszewo, Poland
- Shchuchyn, Belarus

== I ==
Irkutsk

- Eugene, United States
- Gangneung, South Korea
- Haute-Savoie, France
- Kanazawa, Japan
- Pforzheim, Germany
- Pordenone Province, Italy
- Prijedor, Bosnia and Herzegovina
- Primorje-Gorski Kotar County, Croatia
- Shenyang, China
- Strömsund, Sweden
- Ulaanbaatar, Mongolia
- Vitebsk, Belarus

Istra

- Bad Orb, Germany
- Bečej, Serbia
- Dyurtyuli, Russia
- Loreto, Italy
- Petrich, Bulgaria
- Pinsk, Belarus

Ivanovo

- Ayia Napa, Cyprus
- Kraljevo, Serbia
- Mladenovac (Belgrade), Serbia
- Orsha, Belarus

Izhevsk

- Brest, Belarus
- Córdoba, Argentina
- Maracay, Venezuela
- Salt Lake City, United States
- Tatabánya, Hungary
- Wuhan, China
- Xining, China
- Yambol, Bulgaria

== K ==
Kaliningrad

- Baranavichy, Belarus
- Bremerhaven, Germany
- Brest, Belarus
- Cagliari, Italy
- Catania, Italy
- Forlì, Italy
- Gomel, Belarus
- Groningen, Netherlands
- Kętrzyn County, Poland
- Kiel, Germany
- Norfolk, United States
- Zeitz, Germany

Kaluga

- Binzhou, China
- Minsk, Belarus
- Niš, Serbia
- Panorama, Greece
- Suhl, Germany
- Tiraspol, Moldova
- Yalta, Ukraine

Kandalaksha

- Kemijärvi, Finland
- Piteå, Sweden

Kansk

- Polotsk, Belarus

Kazan

- Ankara, Turkey
- Antalya, Turkey
- Arkadag, Turkmenistan
- Astana, Kazakhstan
- Braunschweig, Germany
- Donetsk, Ukraine
- Eskişehir, Turkey
- Guangzhou, China
- Hangzhou, China
- Harare, Zimbabwe
- Isfahan, Iran
- Istanbul, Turkey
- Monufia, Egypt
- Qalyubiyya, Egypt
- Tabriz, Iran

Kemerovo

- Salgótarján, Hungary

Khabarovsk

- Bucheon, South Korea
- Harbin, China
- Mogilev, Belarus
- Niigata, Japan
- Portland, United States
- Sanya, China

Khimki

- Grodno, Belarus

Kineshma

- Baranavichy, Belarus
- (Georgia (country)) Gudauta, Georgia

Kingisepp

- Jõhvi, Estonia
- Narvik, Norway
- (Georgia (country)) Pitsunda, Georgia
- Raisio, Finland
- Renhuai, China
- Sassnitz, Germany
- Svietlahorsk, Belarus

Klin

- Byerazino, Belarus
- Krychaw, Belarus
- Lappeenranta, Finland
- Meishan, China
- Orly, France

Komsomolsk-on-Amur

- Jiamusi, China
- Kamo, Japan
- Weinan, China

Kostroma

- Babruysk, Belarus
- Bari, Italy
- Bat Yam, Israel
- Cetinje, Montenegro
- (Moldova) Ceadîr-Lunga, Moldavia
- Danilov, Russia
- Dole, France
- Ijevan, Armenia
- (Georgia (country)) Ochamchire, Georgia
- Oral, Kazakhstan
- Samokov, Bulgaria
- Sanmenxia, China
- (Moldova) Soroca, Moldavia
- Vrbas, Serbia

Kotelniki

- Rahachow, Belarus
- Sudak, Ukraine

Kotlas

- Waterville, United States

Krasnodar

- Burgas, Bulgaria
- Ferrara, Italy
- Harbin, China
- Istočno Sarajevo, Bosnia and Herzegovina
- Karlsruhe, Germany
- Nancy, France
- (Georgia (country)) Sukhumi, Georgia
- Wels, Austria

Krasnogorsk

- Antibes, France
- Goirle, Netherlands
- Höchstadt an der Aisch, Germany
- Karelichy, Belarus
- Slivnitsa, Bulgaria
- Tukums, Latvia
- Wągrowiec, Poland

Krasnoyarsk

- Changchun, China
- Cremona, Italy
- Heihe, China
- Istaravshan, Tajikistan
- Jalal-Abad, Kyrgyzstan
- Kokshetau, Kazakhstan
- Manzhouli, China
- Oneonta, United States
- Samarkand, Uzbekistan

Kronstadt

- Annapolis, United States
- Asipovichy, Belarus
- Changli County, China
- Dax, France
- Demre, Turkey
- Feodosia, Ukraine
- Ii, Finland
- Lushan, China
- Marostica, Italy
- Messina, Italy
- Mühlhausen, Germany
- Nafplio, Greece
- Narva-Jõesuu, Estonia
- Nordborg (Sønderborg), Denmark
- Oulu, Finland
- Oxelösund, Sweden
- Pinghu, China
- Põhja-Tallinn (Tallinn), Estonia
- Pudasjärvi, Finland
- Sumoto, Japan
- Toulon, France
- Zhongshan County, China

Kursk

- Bar, Montenegro
- Donetsk, Ukraine
- Feodosia, Ukraine
- Gomel, Belarus
- Niš, Serbia
- Novopolotsk, Belarus
- Polotsk, Belarus
- Primorsko, Bulgaria
- Speyer, Germany
- (Georgia (country)) Sukhumi, Georgia
- Tiraspol, Moldova
- Užice, Serbia
- Witten, Germany

== L ==
Lipetsk

- Anshan, China
- Cottbus, Germany
- Fabriano, Italy
- Vitebsk, Belarus

Lomonosov

- Anacortes, United States
- Framingham, United States
- Mariehamn, Åland Islands, Finland
- Oberursel, Germany

== M ==
Magadan

- Anchorage, United States
- Baranavichy, Belarus
- Shuangyashan, China
- Tonghua, China
- Zlatitsa, Bulgaria

Magnitogorsk

- Atyrau, Kazakhstan
- Brandenburg an der Havel, Germany
- Gomel, Belarus
- Huai'an, China

Makhachkala

- Biskra, Algeria
- Hatten, Germany
- Ndola, Zambia
- Oldenburg, Germany
- Sfax, Tunisia
- Siping, China
- Yalova, Turkey

Maloyaroslavets

- Barysaw, Belarus
- Holíč, Slovakia
- Serpukhov, Russia

Michurinsk

- Munster, Germany
- Smolyan, Bulgaria

Mikhaylovsk

- Jurong, China
- Zhenjiang, China

Moscow

- Almaty, Kazakhstan
- Ankara, Turkey
- Astana, Kazakhstan
- Baku, Azerbaijan
- Bangkok, Thailand
- Beijing, China
- Bucharest, Romania
- Buenos Aires, Argentina
- Cusco, Peru
- Dubai, United Arab Emirates
- Ganja, Azerbaijan
- Hanoi, Vietnam
- Ho Chi Minh City, Vietnam
- Jakarta, Indonesia
- Ljubljana, Slovenia
- London, England, United Kingdom
- Manila, Philippines
- New Delhi, India
- La Paz, Bolivia
- Pyongyang, North Korea
- Rasht, Iran
- Seoul, South Korea
- Tashkent, Uzbekistan
- Tehran, Iran
- Tokyo, Japan
- Ulaanbaatar, Mongolia

Mtsensk

- Kubrat, Bulgaria

Murmansk

- Alanya, Turkey
- Groningen, Netherlands
- Harbin, China
- Jacksonville, United States
- Minsk, Belarus
- Vadsø, Norway

Mytishchi

- Angarsk, Russia
- Bakhchysarai, Ukraine
- Baranavichy, Belarus
- Barysaw, Belarus
- Düren (district), Germany
- Gabrovo, Bulgaria
- Lecco, Italy
- Smalyavichy, Belarus
- Zhodzina, Belarus

== N ==
Nakhodka

- Bellingham, United States
- Donghae, South Korea
- Jilin City, China
- Maizuru, Japan
- Oakland, United States
- Otaru, Japan
- Phuket, Thailand
- Tsuruga, Japan

Naro-Fominsk

- Babruysk, Belarus
- Daugavpils, Latvia
- Elin Pelin, Bulgaria

Nizhny Novgorod

- Bălți, Moldova
- Dobrich, Bulgaria
- Essen, Germany
- Győr, Hungary
- Hefei, China
- Heraklion, Greece
- Jinan, China
- Linz, Austria
- Matanzas, Cuba
- Minsk, Belarus
- Novi Sad, Serbia
- Philadelphia, United States
- Sant Boi de Llobregat, Spain
- (Georgia (country)) Sukhumi, Georgia
- Suwon, South Korea

Nizhny Tagil

- Brest, Belarus
- Novokuznetsk, Russia
- Yevpatoria, Ukraine

Novocherkassk

- Iserlohn, Germany
- Levski, Bulgaria
- Novi Bečej, Serbia
- La Valette-du-Var, France

Novorossiysk

- Brest, Belarus
- Gainesville, United States
- Gavar, Armenia
- Gijón, Spain
- Heilbronn, Germany
- Khanty-Mansiysk, Russia
- Livorno, Italy
- Pula, Croatia
- Qingdao, China
- Samsun, Turkey
- Tyre, Lebanon
- Valparaíso, Chile
- Varna, Bulgaria

Novosibirsk

- Daejeon, South Korea
- Mianyang, China
- Minneapolis, United States
- Minsk, Belarus
- Osh, Kyrgyzstan
- Saint Paul, United States
- Sapporo, Japan
- Sevastopol, Ukraine
- Shenyang, China
- Tiraspol, Moldova
- Ulaanbaatar, Mongolia
- Varna, Bulgaria
- Yerevan, Armenia

== O ==
Obninsk

- Astravyets, Belarus
- Belene, Bulgaria
- Frascati, Italy
- Mianyang, China
- Montpellier, France
- Oak Ridge, United States

Odintsovo

- Kruševac, Serbia
- Novopolotsk, Belarus
- Wittmund, Germany

Omsk

- Antalya, Turkey
- Fuzhou, China
- Gomel, Belarus
- Kaifeng, China
- Manzhouli, China
- Mogilev, Belarus
- Pavlodar, Kazakhstan
- Petropavl, Kazakhstan
- Púchov, Slovakia
- Ürümqi, China

Orenburg

- Aktobe, Kazakhstan
- Khujand, Tajikistan
- Oral, Kazakhstan

Oryol

- Krychaw district, Belarus
- Mary, Turkmenistan
- Offenbach am Main, Germany
- Zhodzina, Belarus

== P ==
Penza

- Lanzhou, China
- Mogilev, Belarus
- Ramat Gan, Israel

Perm

- Agrigento, Italy
- Amnéville, France
- Duisburg, Germany
- Qingdao, China

Petropavlovsk-Kamchatsky

- Kushiro, Japan
- Unalaska, United States

Petrozavodsk

- Brest, Belarus
- Duluth, United States
- Joensuu, Finland
- Neubrandenburg, Germany
- La Rochelle, France
- Tübingen, Germany
- Vagharshapat, Armenia
- Varkaus, Finland

Podolsk

- Bălți, Moldova
- Barysaw, Belarus
- Hengyang, China
- Kavarna, Bulgaria
- Saint-Ouen-sur-Seine, France
- Shumen, Bulgaria
- Vanadzor, Armenia

Protvino

- Antony, France
- Bowling Green, United States
- Gomel, Belarus
- Lahoysk, Belarus
- Milan, United States
- Somero, Finland

Pskov

- Arles, France
- Daugavpils, Latvia
- Gera, Germany
- Neuss, Germany
- Nijmegen, Netherlands
- Rēzekne, Latvia
- Vitebsk, Belarus

Pushkin

- Bălți, Moldova
- Cambrai, France
- Kalamazoo, United States
- Mantua, Italy
- Nassau County, United States
- Neukölln (Berlin), Germany
- Novopolotsk, Belarus
- Semey, Kazakhstan
- Valence, France
- Veria, Greece
- Worcester, United States
- Zerbst, Germany

Pyatigorsk

- Dilijan, Armenia
- Hévíz, Hungary
- Kochi, India
- Panagyurishte, Bulgaria
- Schwerte, Germany
- Trikala, Greece

== R ==
Rostov-on-Don

- Antalya, Turkey
- Dortmund, Germany
- Gera, Germany
- Kajaani, Finland
- Le Mans, France
- Minsk, Belarus
- Pleven, Bulgaria
- Seville, Spain
- Volos, Greece
- Yerevan, Armenia

Ryazan

- Alessandria, Italy
- Bressuire, France
- Brest, Belarus
- Genoa, Italy
- Lovech, Bulgaria
- Münster, Germany
- (Georgia (country)) New Athos, Georgia
- Xuzhou, China

== S ==
Saint Petersburg

- Alexandria, Egypt
- Almaty, Kazakhstan
- Antwerp, Belgium
- Aqaba, Jordan
- Astana, Kazakhstan
- Baku, Azerbaijan
- Bangkok, Thailand
- Barcelona, Spain
- Bethlehem, Palestine
- Bordeaux, France
- Busan, South Korea
- Cape Town, South Africa
- Colombo, Sri Lanka
- Daegu, South Korea
- Daugavpils, Latvia
- Debrecen, Hungary
- Dresden, Germany
- Dushanbe, Tajikistan
- Guadalajara, Mexico
- Haiphong, Vietnam
- Hamburg, Germany
- Havana, Cuba
- Ho Chi Minh City, Vietnam
- Istanbul, Turkey
- Khartoum, Sudan
- Klaksvík, Faroe Islands
- Los Angeles, United States
- Mar del Plata, Argentina
- Maribor, Slovenia
- Milan, Italy
- Mumbai, India
- Nampo, North Korea
- Nice, France
- Osaka, Japan
- Osh, Kyrgyzstan
- Piraeus, Greece
- Plovdiv, Bulgaria
- Qingdao, China
- Rio de Janeiro, Brazil
- Rotterdam, Netherlands
- Santiago de Cuba, Cuba
- Sevastopol, Ukraine
- Shanghai, China
- St. Petersburg, United States
- Venice, Italy
- Westport, United States
- Zagreb, Croatia

Samara

- Feodosia, Ukraine
- Gomel, Belarus
- Krimml, Austria
- Oral, Kazakhstan
- Palermo, Italy
- Samarkand, Uzbekistan
- Spitak, Armenia
- Stara Zagora, Bulgaria
- Stuttgart, Germany
- St. Louis, United States
- Tongyeong, South Korea
- Zhengzhou, China

Saransk

- Botevgrad, Bulgaria

Saratov

- Dobrich, Bulgaria
- Wuhan, China

Sergiyev Posad

- Cephalonia, Greece
- Fulda, Germany
- (Georgia (country)) New Athos, Georgia
- Rueil-Malmaison, France
- Saldus, Latvia
- Slonim, Belarus
- Vagharshapat, Armenia

Serpukhov

- Aleksin, Russia
- Baltiysk, Russia
- Blagoveshchensk, Russia
- Maloyaroslavets, Russia
- Sievierodonetsk, Ukraine
- Slutsk, Belarus
- Zaslawye, Belarus
- Zhanjiang, China

Severodvinsk

- Mazyr, Belarus

Shakhty

- Armavir, Armenia
- Gelsenkirchen, Germany
- Nikopol, Bulgaria
- Sievierodonetsk, Ukraine

Shchyolkovo

- Celje, Slovenia
- Feodosia, Ukraine
- (Georgia (country)) Gagra, Georgia
- Grodno Region, Belarus
- Grodzisk County, Poland
- Hemer, Germany
- (Moldova) Orhei District, Moldavia
- Rakoniewice, Poland
- Širvintos, Lithuania

Smolensk

- Bhopal, India
- Hagen, Germany
- Kerch, Ukraine
- Kragujevac, Serbia
- Krasnodon, Ukraine
- Maskowski (Minsk), Belarus
- Mogilev, Belarus
- Orsha, Belarus
- Targovishte, Bulgaria
- Tulle, France
- Vitebsk, Belarus
- Vologda, Russia

Sochi

- Baden-Baden, Germany
- Long Beach, United States
- Menton, France
- Nagato, Japan
- Rimini, Italy
- Trabzon, Turkey
- Weihai, China

Solnechnogorsk

- Krupki, Belarus
- Mali Iđoš, Serbia
- Smederevska Palanka, Serbia

Sosnovy Bor

- Alexandroupoli, Greece
- Astravyets, Belarus
- Kalajoki, Finland
- Pyhäjoki, Finland

Sovetsk

- Kiel, Germany
- Lidzbark Warmiński, Poland
- Považská Bystrica, Slovakia

Spassky District

- Denpasar, Indonesia
- Safranbolu, Turkey

Stary Oskol

- Asenovgrad, Bulgaria
- Mänttä-Vilppula, Finland
- Salzgitter, Germany

Stavropol

- Béziers, France
- Changzhou, China
- Pazardzhik, Bulgaria
- Yerevan, Armenia
- Zhenjiang, China

Stupino

- N'Djamena, Chad
- Nahariya, Israel
- Pančevo, Serbia
- Telgte, Germany
- Velingrad, Bulgaria

Surgut

- Chaoyang, China
- Katerini, Greece
- Zalaegerszeg, Hungary

Suzdal

- Cles, Italy
- Évora, Portugal
- Loches, France
- Rothenburg ob der Tauber, Germany
- Shangrao, China
- Windham, United States

Syktyvkar

- Cullera, Spain
- Debrecen, Hungary
- Los Altos, United States
- Lovech, Bulgaria
- Taiyuan, China

== T ==
Taganrog

- Antratsyt, Ukraine
- Badenweiler, Germany
- Cherven Bryag, Bulgaria
- Jining, China
- Khartsyzk, Ukraine
- Lüdenscheid, Germany

Tikhvin

- Hérouville-Saint-Clair, France
- Imatra, Finland

Tolyatti

- Babruysk, Belarus
- Flint, United States
- Futian (Shenzhen), China
- Kazanlak, Bulgaria
- Luoyang, China
- Nagykanizsa, Hungary
- Piacenza, Italy
- Wolfsburg, Germany

Tomsk

- Ulsan, South Korea

Torzhok

- Melle, Germany
- Savonlinna, Finland
- Slonim, Belarus

Tula

- Barranquilla, Colombia
- Kerch, Ukraine
- Magelang, Indonesia
- Mogilev, Belarus
- Villingen-Schwenningen, Germany

Tver

- Bergamo, Italy
- Besançon, France
- Budyonnovsk, Russia
- Feodosia, Ukraine
- Gyumri, Armenia
- Kaposvár, Hungary
- Montemurlo, Italy
- Orsha, Belarus
- Osnabrück, Germany
- Veliko Tarnovo, Bulgaria
- Yingkou, China

Tyumen

- Brest, Belarus
- Celle, Germany
- Daqing, China

== U ==
Ufa

- Ankara, Turkey
- Astana, Kazakhstan
- Bishkek, Kyrgyzstan
- Halle, Germany
- Hefei, China
- Minsk, Belarus
- Nanchang, China
- Qiqihar, China
- Shenyang, China

Uglich

- Idstein, Germany
- Keuruu, Finland

Ulan-Ude

- Anyang, South Korea
- Changchun, China
- Chita, Russia
- Darkhan, Mongolia
- Donetsk, Ukraine
- Elista, Russia
- Erdenet, Mongolia
- Erenhot, China
- Grozny, Russia
- Haeju, North Korea
- Hohhot, China
- Hulunbuir, China
- Lalitpur, Nepal
- Lanzhou, China
- Manzhouli, China
- Rumoi, Japan
- Taipei, Taiwan
- Ulaanbaatar, Mongolia
- Ulanqab, China
- Yalta, Ukraine
- Yamagata, Japan
- Yeongwol, South Korea

Ulyanovsk

- Changsha, China
- Feodosia, Ukraine
- Gomel, Belarus
- Jincheng, China
- Krefeld, Germany
- Macon, United States
- Minsk, Belarus
- Wuhu, China
- Xiangtan, China

== V ==
Veliky Novgorod

- Bielefeld, Germany
- Kohtla-Järve, Estonia
- Moss, Norway
- Nanterre, France
- Rochester, United States
- Watford, England, United Kingdom
- Zibo, China

Verkhnyaya Pyshma

- Zhodzina, Belarus

Vladikavkaz

- Asheville, United States
- Vladivostok, Russia
- Yalta, Ukraine

Vladimir

- Anghiari, Italy
- Antalya, Turkey
- Babruysk, Belarus
- Baoji, China
- Bethlehem, Palestine
- Bloomington, United States
- Bukhara, Uzbekistan
- Campobasso, Italy
- Canterbury, England, United Kingdom
- Chongqing, China
- Erlangen, Germany
- (Georgia (country)) Gagra, Georgia
- Haikou, China
- Kardzhali, Bulgaria
- Karlovo, Bulgaria
- Kerava, Finland
- Khujand, Tajikistan
- Leninsky (Minsk), Belarus
- Normal, United States
- Saintes, France
- Sarasota, United States
- Vawkavysk, Belarus

Vladivostok

- Akita, Japan
- Busan, South Korea
- Dalian, China
- Hakodate, Japan
- Harbin, China
- Ho Chi Minh City, Vietnam
- Incheon, South Korea
- Juneau, United States
- Kota Kinabalu, Malaysia
- Manta, Ecuador
- Mogilev, Belarus
- Niigata, Japan
- Pohang, South Korea
- San Diego, United States
- Tacoma, United States
- Vladikavkaz, Russia
- Wonsan, North Korea
- Yanbian, China

Volgodonsk

- Dolni Dabnik, Bulgaria
- Orsha, Belarus
- Tamási, Hungary

Volgograd

- Chemnitz, Germany
- Chengdu, China
- Chennai, India
- Cleveland, United States
- Cologne, Germany
- Hiroshima, Japan
- İzmir, Turkey
- Jilin City, China
- Kruševac, Serbia
- Olevano Romano, Italy
- Ortona, Italy
- Port Said, Egypt
- Ruse, Bulgaria
- Yerevan, Armenia

Vologda

- Burgas, Bulgaria
- Galle, Sri Lanka
- Grodno, Belarus
- Gyumri, Armenia
- Kastrychnitski (Minsk), Belarus
- Mogilev, Belarus
- Sevastopol, Ukraine
- Smolensk, Russia
- Yevpatoria, Ukraine
- Yingtan, China

Volokolamsk

- Chachersk, Belarus
- Dzyarzhynsk, Belarus
- Kapchagay, Kazakhstan
- Krāslava, Latvia
- Požarevac, Serbia
- Shopokov, Kyrgyzstan
- Sudak, Ukraine
- Tokmok, Kyrgyzstan
- Vasylkiv, Ukraine

Volzhsky

- Cleveland Heights, United States
- Collegno, Italy
- Lianyungang, China
- Shaker Heights, United States

Voronezh

- Chongqing, China
- Gomel, Belarus
- León, Spain
- Sliven, Bulgaria
- Wesermarsch (district), Germany

== Y ==
Yakutsk

- Fairbanks, United States
- Harbin, China
- Heihe, China
- Murayama, Japan
- Olympia, Greece
- Velingrad, Bulgaria

Yaroslavl

- Burgas, Bulgaria
- Dubnica nad Váhom, Slovakia
- Hanau, Germany
- Jyväskylä, Finland
- Kassel, Germany
- Nanjing, China
- Palermo, Italy
- Poitiers, France

Yekaterinburg

- Annaba, Algeria
- Ferentino, Italy
- Guangzhou, China
- Incheon, South Korea
- Managua, Nicaragua
- Plovdiv, Bulgaria
- San Jose, United States

Yelets

- Barysaw, Belarus

Yessentuki

- Elliniko-Argyroupoli, Greece
- Naftalan, Azerbaijan
- Saky, Ukraine
- Strelcha, Bulgaria
- Thrissur, India

Yoshkar-Ola

- Bourges, France
- Princeton, United States
- Szombathely, Hungary

== Z ==
Zheleznogorsk

- Basarabeasca District, Moldova
- Spremberg, Germany
- Svishtov, Bulgaria
- Zhodzina, Belarus

Zhukovsky

- Le Bourget, France
- Fangchenggang, China
- Meerut, India
- Zhuhai, China
