= Geography of Belarus =

Coordinates: 53°N 28°E

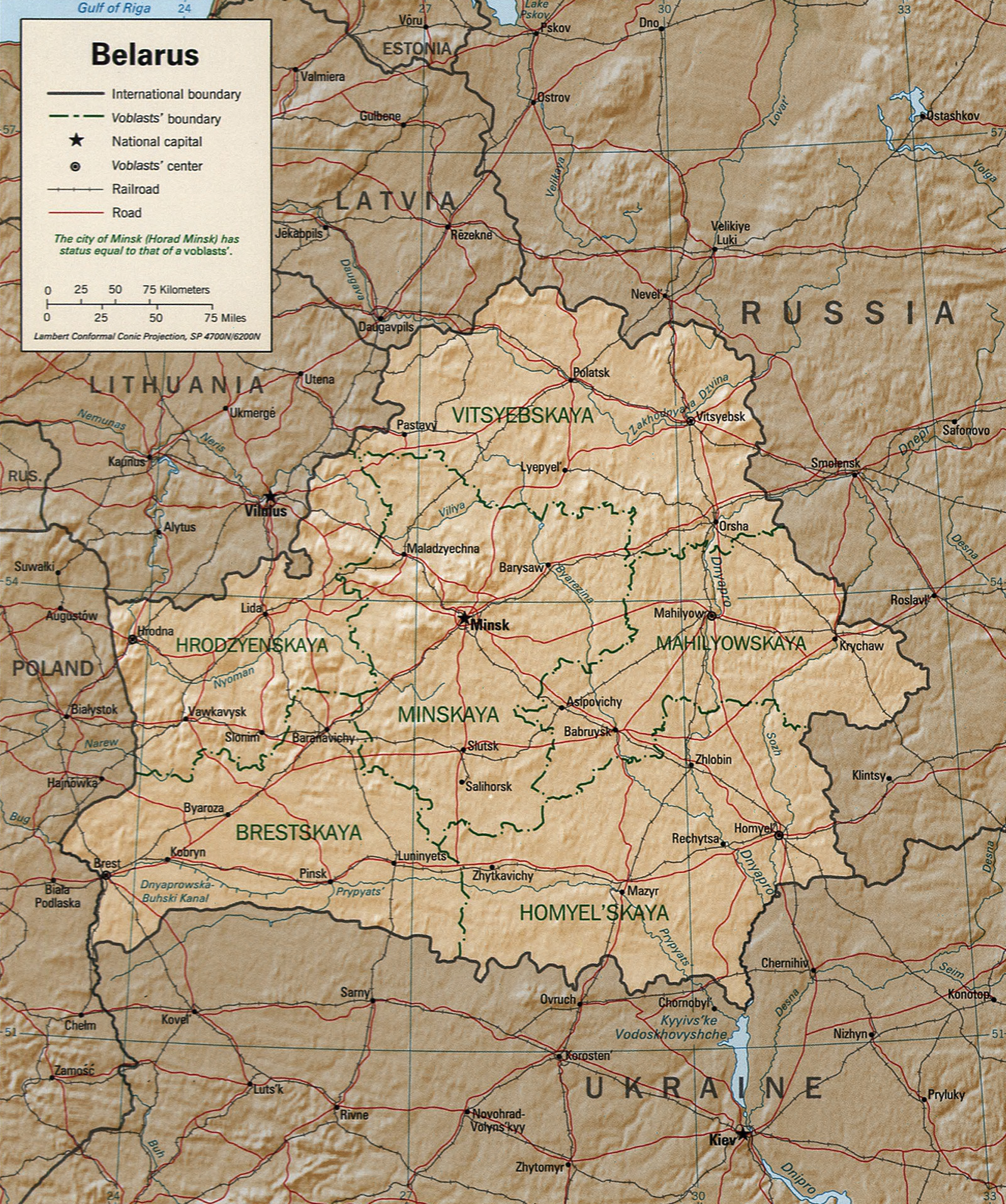
Detailed map of Belarus

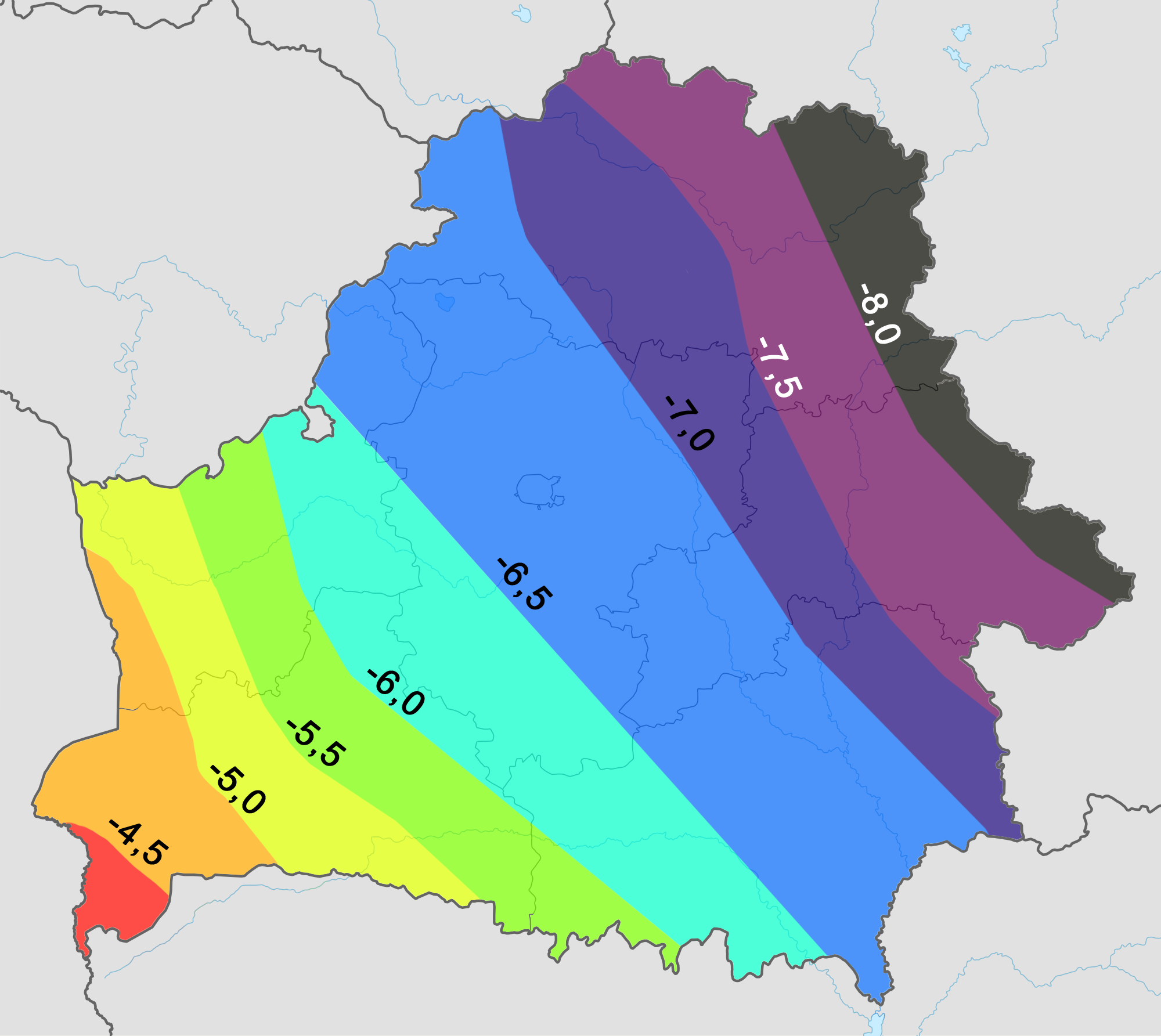
Average temperature in January (all numbers are in °C)

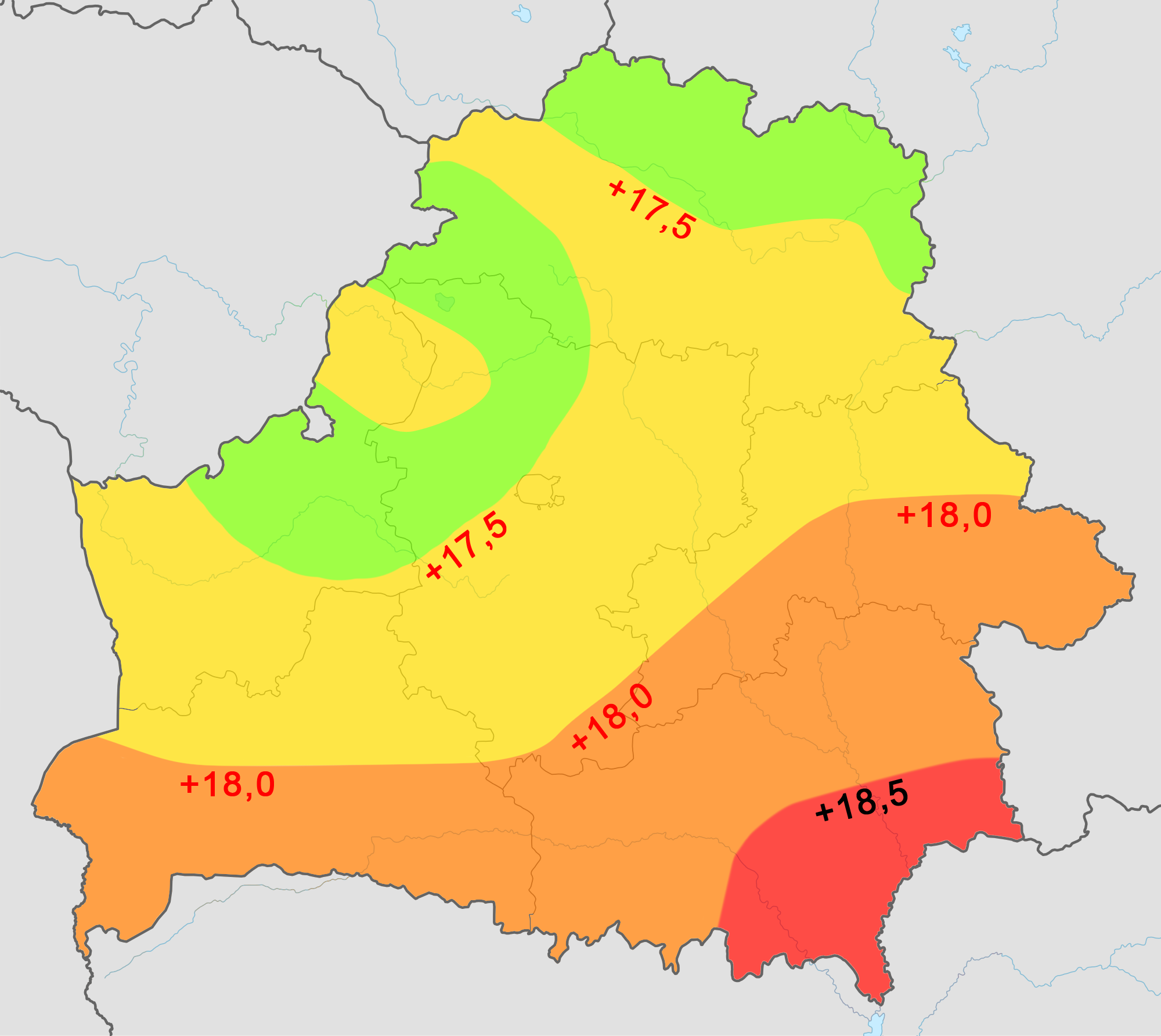
Average temperature in July (all numbers are in °C)

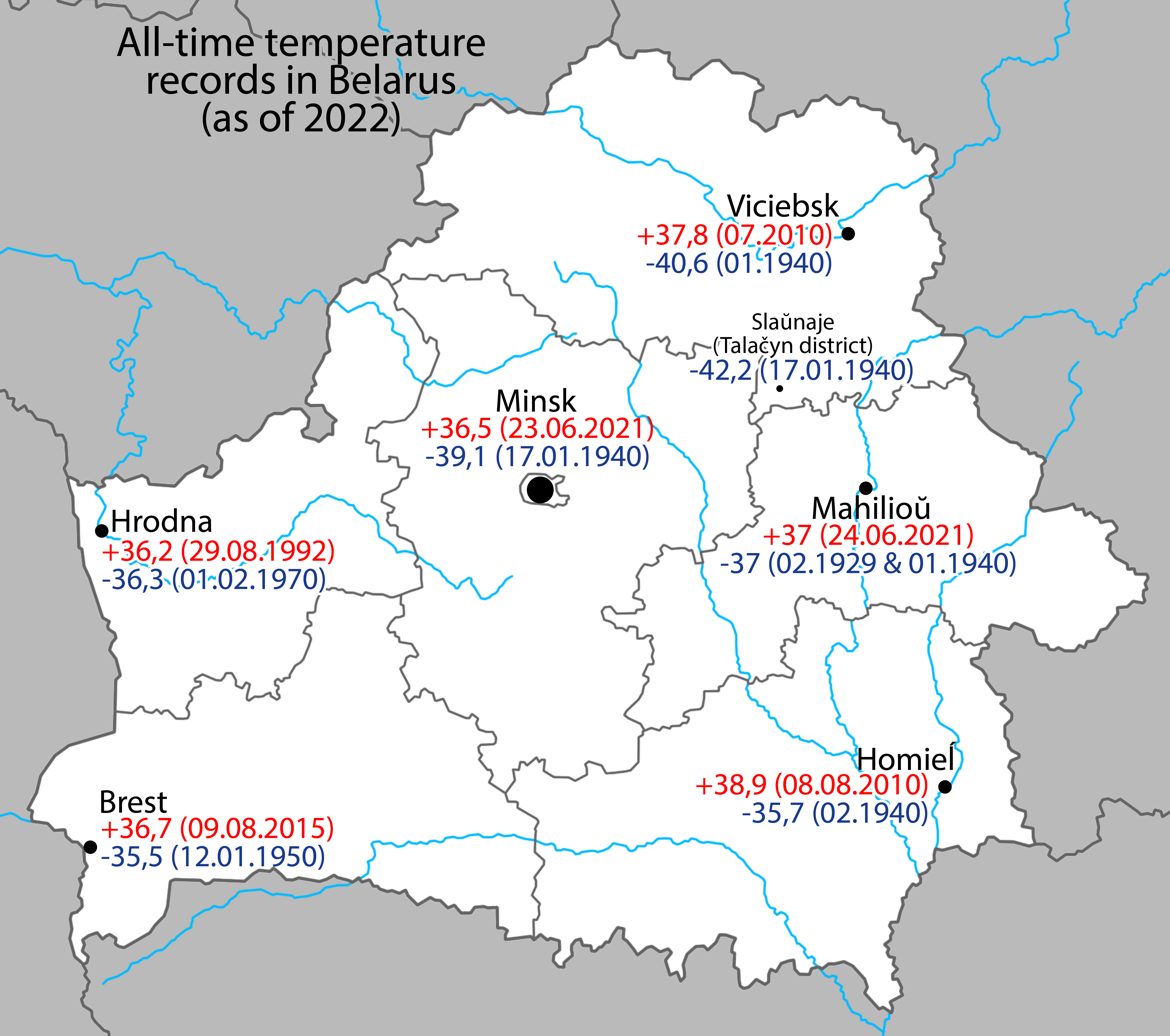
All-time temperature records in major cities of Belarus

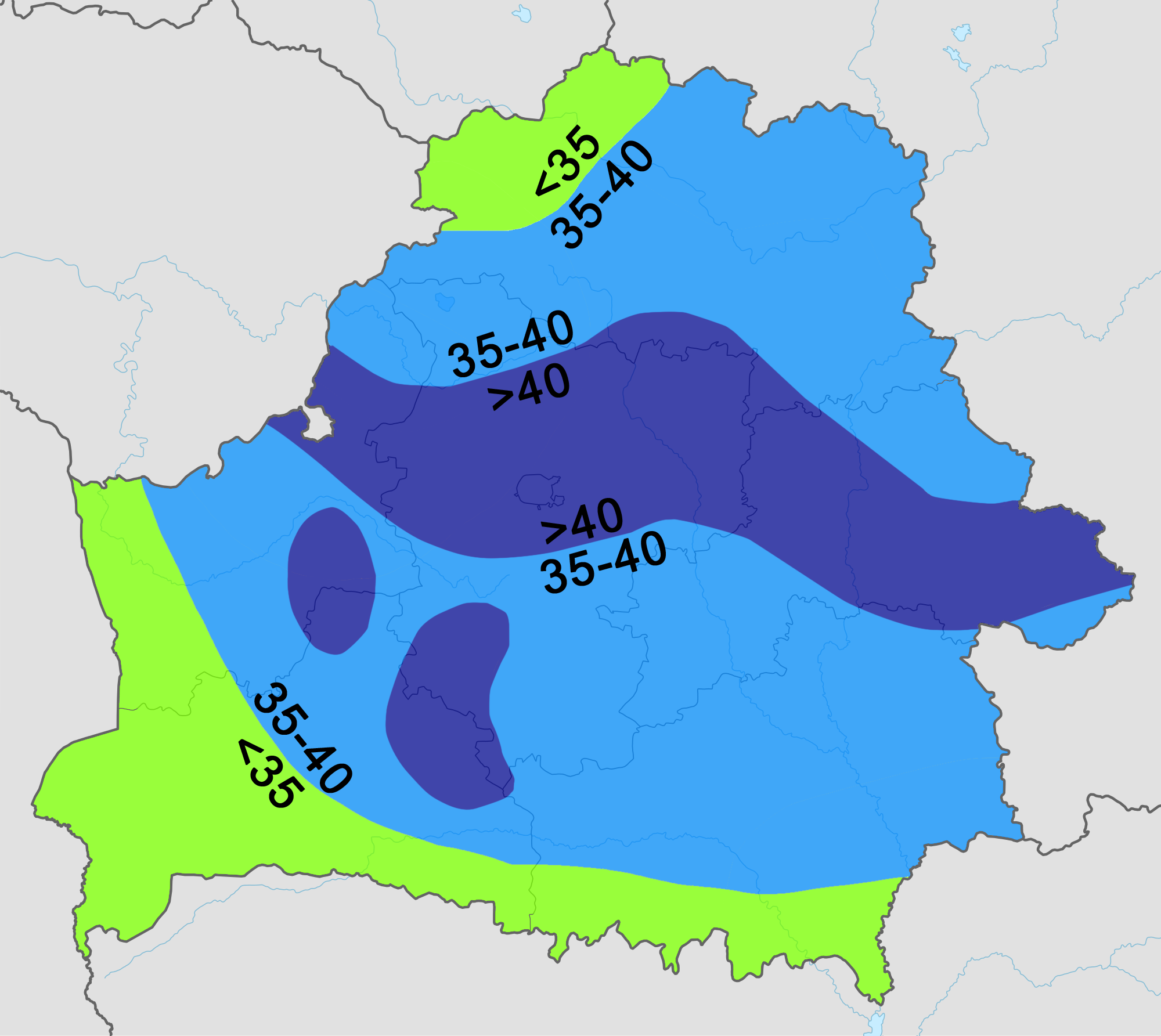
Average precipitation in January (all numbers are in millimeters)

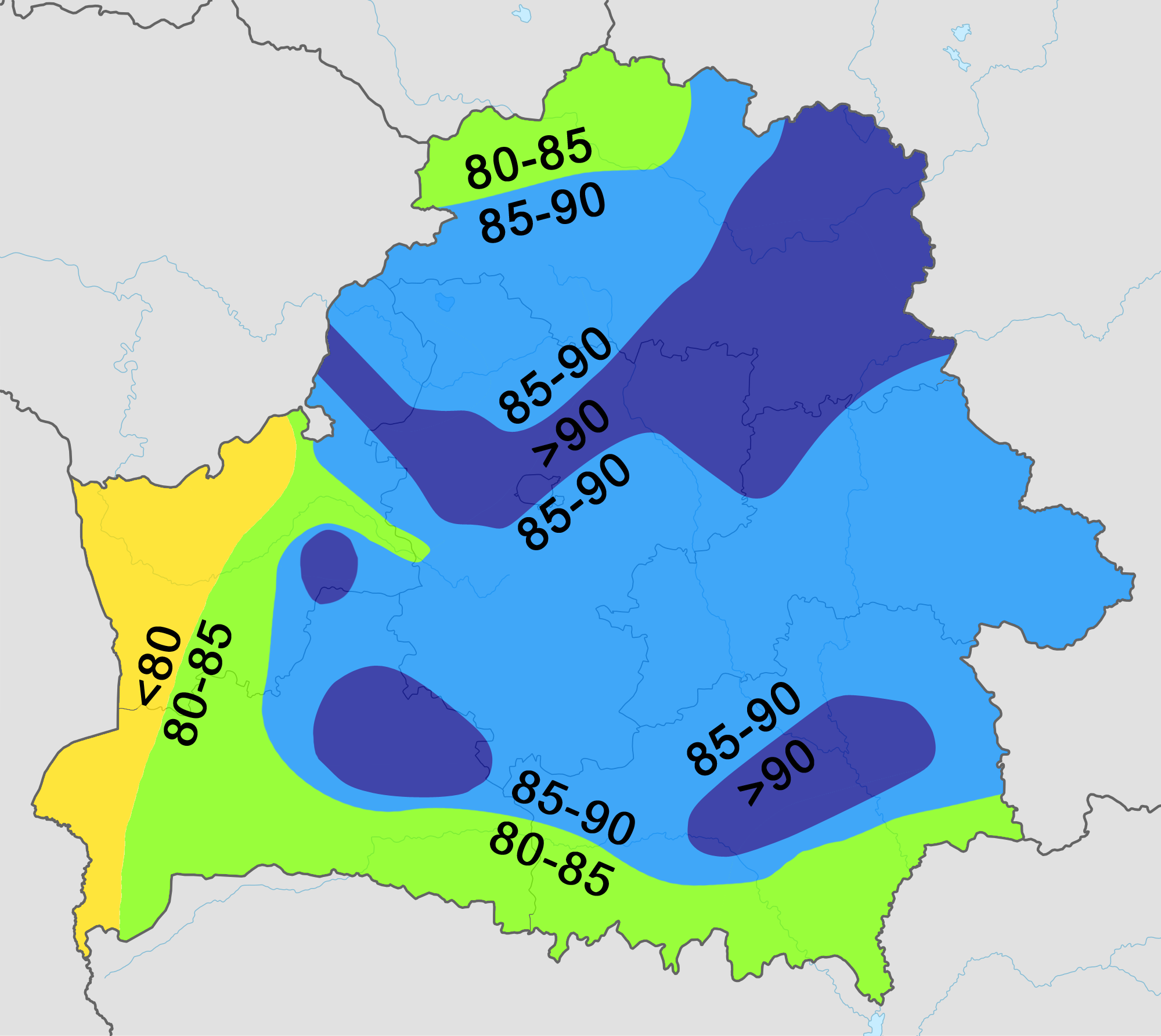
Average precipitation in July (all numbers are in millimeters)

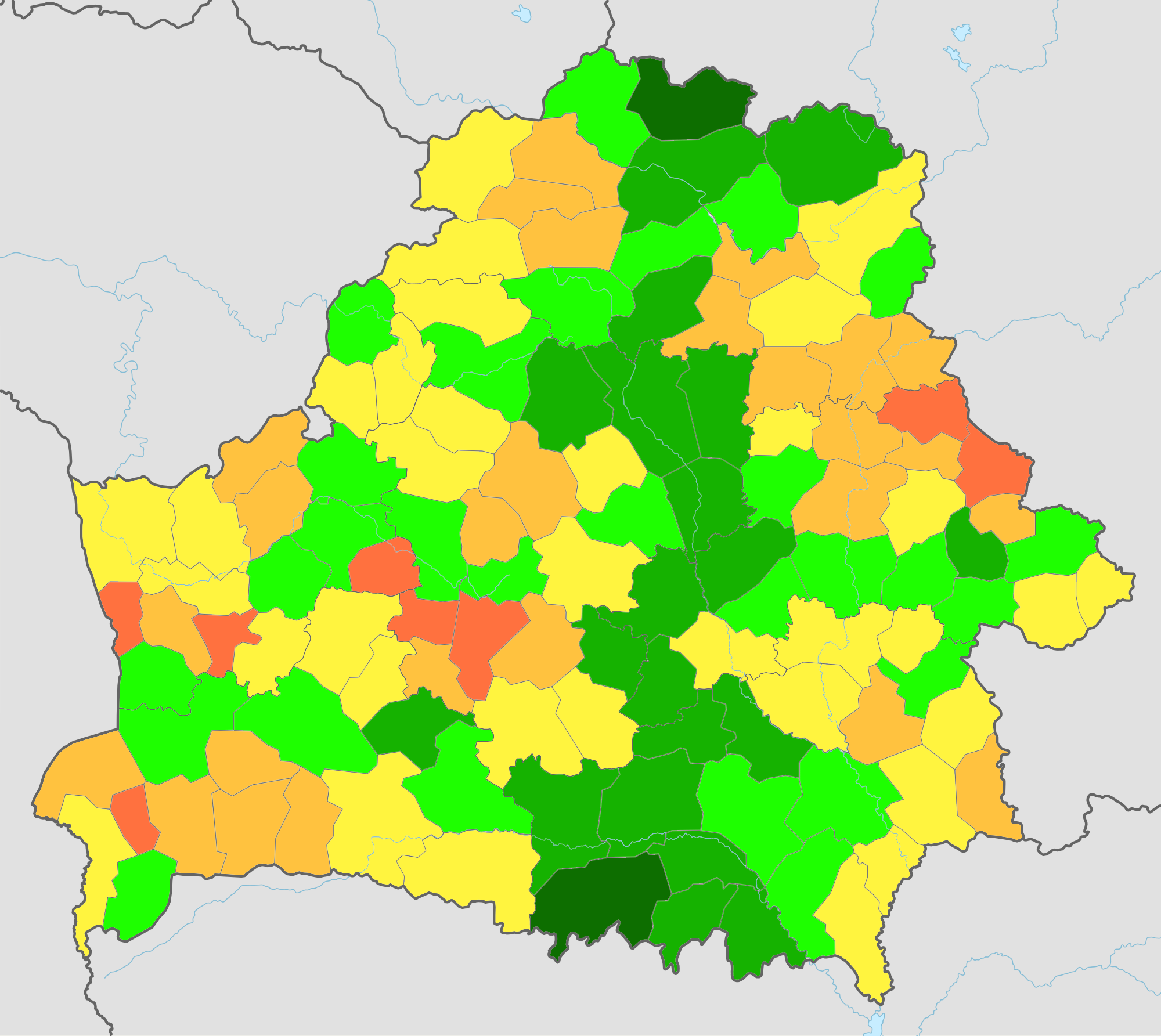
Share of forests in rayons' (districts') area in Belarus. over 60% 50–60% 40–50% 30–40% 20–30% less than 20%

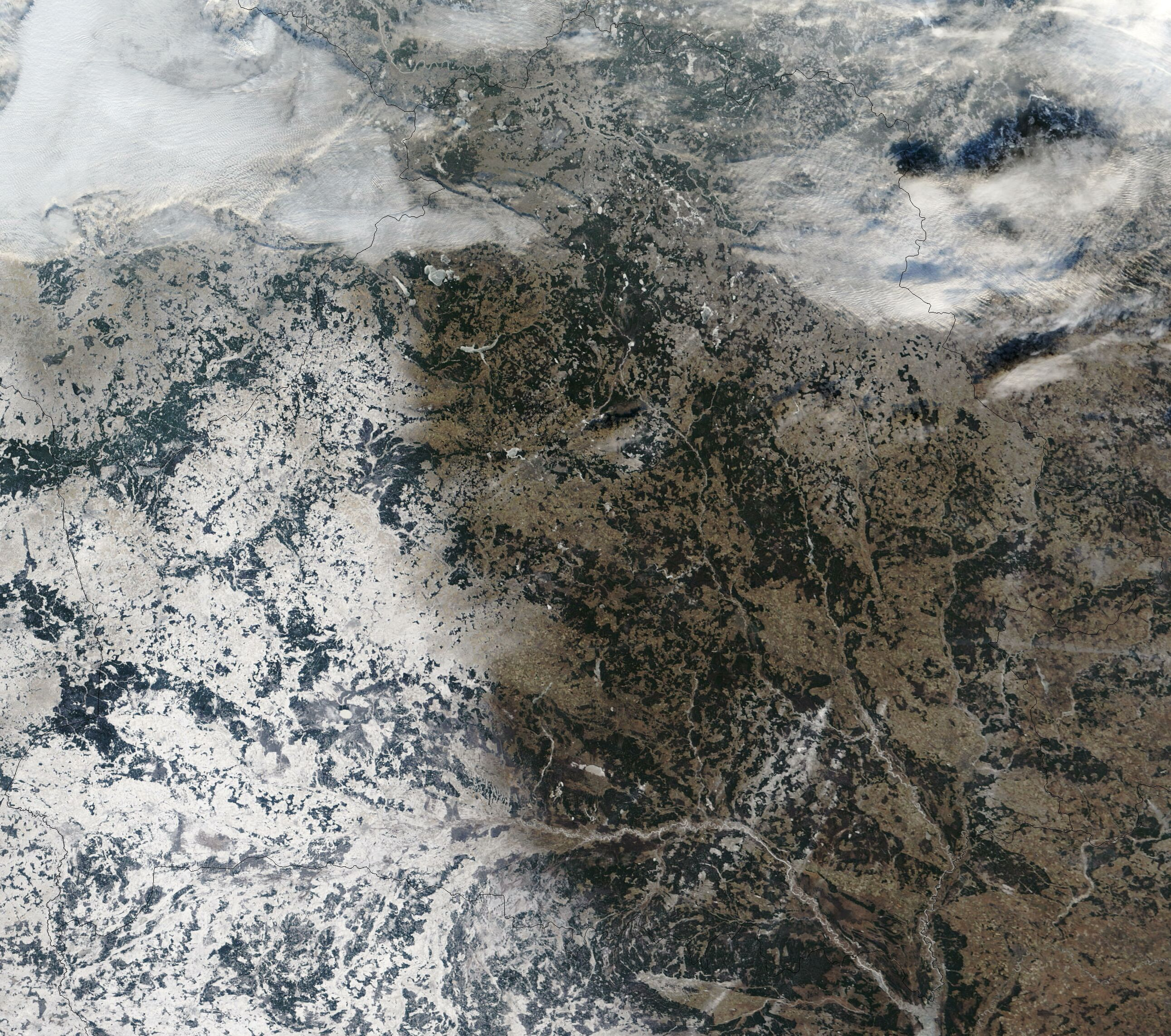
Satellite image of Belarus in December 2002.

Belarus is a landlocked country that occupies an area of 207,600 square kilometers (80,200 sq mi). (Note: slightly smaller than the United Kingdom or the U.S. state of Kansas) It lacks natural borders, and the average elevation of Belarus is 162 meters (531 ft) above sea level. Its neighbors are Russia to the east and northeast, Latvia to the north, Lithuania to the northwest, Poland to the west, and Ukraine to the south. Its extension from north to south is 560 km (350 mi), from west to east is 650 km (400 mi).

== Topography and drainage ==
Belarus's level terrain is broken up by the Belarusian Ridge (Byelaruskaya Hrada), a swathe of elevated territory of individual highlands, that runs diagonally through the country from west-southwest to east-northeast. Its highest point is the 346-meter (1,135 ft) Mount Dzyarzhynskaya, named after Felix Dzerzhinsky, head of Cheka. Northern Belarus has a hilly landscape with many lakes and gently sloping ridges created by glacial debris. In the south, about one-third of the republic's territory around the Pripiac River is taken up by the low-lying swampy plain of Palyessye, shared with Ukraine, Poland, and Russia. On March 29, 2024, an information sign - a monument - was opened in the extreme eastern point of Belarus, Khotimsk.

Belarus's 3,000 streams and 4,000 lakes are major features of the landscape and are used for floating timber, shipping, and power generation. Major rivers are the west-flowing Western Dvina and Nyoman, and the south-flowing Dnieper with its tributaries, the Berezina, Sozh, and Prypyat. The Prypyat river has served as a bridge between the Dnieper, flowing to Ukraine, and the Vistula in Poland since the period of Kievan Rus'.

Glacial scouring accounts for the flatness of Belarusian terrain and for its numerous lakes. Lake Narach, the country's largest lake, covers 79.6 km^{2}. Other big lakes are the Osveya (52.8 km^{2}), the Chervonoye (43.8 km^{2}), the Lukomlskoye (36.7 km^{2}) and the Dryvyaty (36.1 km^{2}). Lake Drūkšiai (44.8 km^{2}) straddles the border of Belarus and Lithuania. The deepest lake in Belarus is the Doŭhaje (53.7 m). The Chervonoye is the most shallow among the large lakes, with a maximum depth of 4 m. The majority of large lakes are situated in northern Belarus. In Braslaw and Ušačy districts, lakes cover more than 10% of their territory.

Nearly one-third of the country is covered with pushchas, large unpopulated tracts of forests. The share of area covered by forests ranges from 34% in the Brest and Hrodna regions to 45% in the Homiel region. Forests cover 36–37.5% of the Minsk, Mahilioŭ and Vitsebsk regions. Districts with the highest percentage of area covered by forests are Rasony and Lielčycy, in the extreme northern and southern parts of Belarus respectively. The level of woodiness had declined – from 60% in 1600 to 22% in 1922 but has started to increase since the middle of the 20th century. The Białowieża Forest, shared with Poland in the far west, is the oldest and most magnificent of the forests; a reservation here shelters animals and birds that became extinct elsewhere in the distant past.

== Climate ==
Because of the proximity of the Baltic Sea (257 kilometers or 160 miles at the closest point), the country has a temperate continental climate. Winters last between 105 and 145 days, and summers last up to 150 days. The average temperature in January is −6 °C (21 °F), and the average temperature for July is about 18 °C (64 °F), with high humidity. Average temperature for July ranges from 17.5 °C (64 °F) in the north, 18.5–19 °C (66 °F) in the south. For January, it ranges from −4.5 °C (24 °F) in the southwest to −8 °C (18 °F) in the northeast. Average annual precipitation ranges from 550 to 700 millimeters (21.7 to 27.6 in) and is sometimes excessive.

The highest average yearly precipitation is in Navahrudak (769 mm per year). The highest yearly precipitation ever recorded was in Vasilievičy (1,115 mm per year), the lowest – in Brahin (298 mm). 70% of precipitation falls from April to October. Heavy rains are common in summer. Sometimes one-day precipitation during summer rainfall exceeds average monthly precipitation. The heaviest rain ever was recorded in July 1973 in Slaŭnaje in Talachyn Raion – 148 mm in one day. The highest humidity level is observed in December and January (90%), the lowest – in May and June (65–70%) with an average level of 80%. Days with humidity lower than 30% are rare – usually less than 20 every year, with only 3–5 such days in some regions. On the contrary, there are more than 100 days with high humidity (over 80%), in some regions – up to 152. Due to high humidity, areas around Minsk and Navahrudak have from 65 to 100 foggy days every year.

Average daily maximum and minimum temperatures for the six largest cities in Belarus
Location	July (°C)	July (°F)	January (°C)	January (°F)
Minsk	23/14	74/57	−2/−6	28/20
Gomel	25/15	77/58	−2/−7	28/19
Mogilev	23/12	74/55	−1/−6	30/21
Vitebsk	23/13	74/56	−3/−7	26/18
Grodno	24/12	75/55	−1/−6	30/21
Brest	25/14	77/58	0/−5	31/23

== Flora and fauna ==
In Belarus, there are nearly 1,500 species of vascular plants (including 1,422 flowering plants), 450 mosses, 2,000 algae and 1,500 fungus species. Forest cover is around 43% of the total land area, equivalent to 8,767,600 hectares (ha) of forest in 2020, up from 7,780,000 ha in 1990. In 2020, naturally regenerating forest covered 6,555,600 ha and planted forest covered 2,212,000 ha. Of the naturally regenerating forest 2% was reported to be primary forest (consisting of native tree species with no clearly visible indications of human activity) and around 16% of the forest area was found within protected areas. For 2015, 100% of the forest area was reported to be under public ownership.

In the north, conifers predominate in forests that also include birch and alder; farther south, other deciduous trees grow. Pines compose 50.2% of total forest area, spruces – 10%, black alder – 8.2%, oaks – 3.3%, gray alder – 2.3%, aspen – 2.1%. 15.4% of Belarus is covered by meadows with one third being natural and the rest being specially cultivated. The most common plants on natural meadows are Deschampsia and several different sedges (Carex). In the marshes, 267 species of Embryophyta are growing – herbs (167 species), trees and bushes (37 species), Bryidae (32 species) and Sphagnopsida (31 species). 50 of them are considered medicinal.

Animals in Belarus are those common to Central and Eastern Europe.

== National parks ==
The national parks are a huge part of the country's identity. The people of Belarus are particularly proud of their country's national parks. Belovezhskaya Pushcha National Park is a preserved part of the UNESCO World Heritage Site Białowieża Forest in Belarus since 1992. Later, the Council of Europe stated that the park was one of the most conservation conscious areas. Many animals can be found in these parks, i.e., red deer, wild boar and elk.

== Environmental concerns ==
=== Current issues ===
- Air quality in Belarus has been an issue for many years. Belarus is ranked third in the world for death associated with air pollution, 100 of every 100,000 deaths from 2010 to 2012. However, in recent years the quality of the air has been improving by almost 50% according to the Organisation for Economic Co-operation and Development. The increased use of natural gas and alternatives to coal is leading the fight against air pollution. Policies implemented in Belarus can also be seen as a leading cause of the quality of air improving. Fines and fees may be used to enforce rules and regulations and also to keep awareness of the issue known. The money brought in from the fees and fines are used by the Environmental Fund in Belarus.
- The south-eastern part of the country was contaminated with fallout from the 1986 accident at the Chernobyl Nuclear Power Plant in Ukraine, receiving about 70% of the radiation. Vast amounts of territory in Gomel and Mogilev Regions were rendered uninhabitable. Roughly 7,000 km^{2} (2,700 sq mi) of soil were contaminated by caesium-137 to levels greater than 15 curies (550 gigabecquerels) per square kilometer, i.e., taken from human usage for an indefinite time. The overall economic costs for containment and decontamination was estimated at $235 billion in Belarus.

=== International agreements ===
- Belarus is party to treaties involving: nitrogen oxides, sulfur 85, biodiversity, climate change, Kyoto Protocol, desertification, endangered species, environmental modification, hazardous wastes, law of the sea, marine dumping, ozone layer protection, ship pollution, and wetlands.

== Area and boundaries ==
Area
- Total: 207,600 km^{2} (80,200 sq mi)
country rank in the world: 86th
- Land: 202,900 km^{2} (78,300 sq mi)
- Water: 4,700 km^{2} (1,800 sq mi)
Area comparative
- Australia comparative: Belarus slightly smaller than Victoria
- Canada comparative: Belarus half the size of Newfoundland and Labrador
- Europe comparative: Belarus holds 13th place, slightly smaller than the United Kingdom or Romania
- United States comparative: Belarus slightly smaller than Kansas.

Land boundaries:
- Total: 3,642 kilometres (2,263 mi)
Border countries:
- Latvia 161 kilometres (100 mi)
- Lithuania 640 kilometres (400 mi)
- Poland 418 kilometres (260 mi)
- Russia 1,312 kilometres (815 mi)
- Ukraine 1,111 kilometres (690 mi)

Coastline
0 km (0 mi). Belarus is landlocked; the nearest body of water is the Baltic Sea, yet Lithuania and Latvia block access to the Baltic.
Maritime claims
None (landlocked)
Elevation extremes
- Lowest point: Neman River 90 metres (300 ft)
- Highest point: Dzyarzhynskaya Hara 346 metres (1,135 ft)

== Natural resources ==
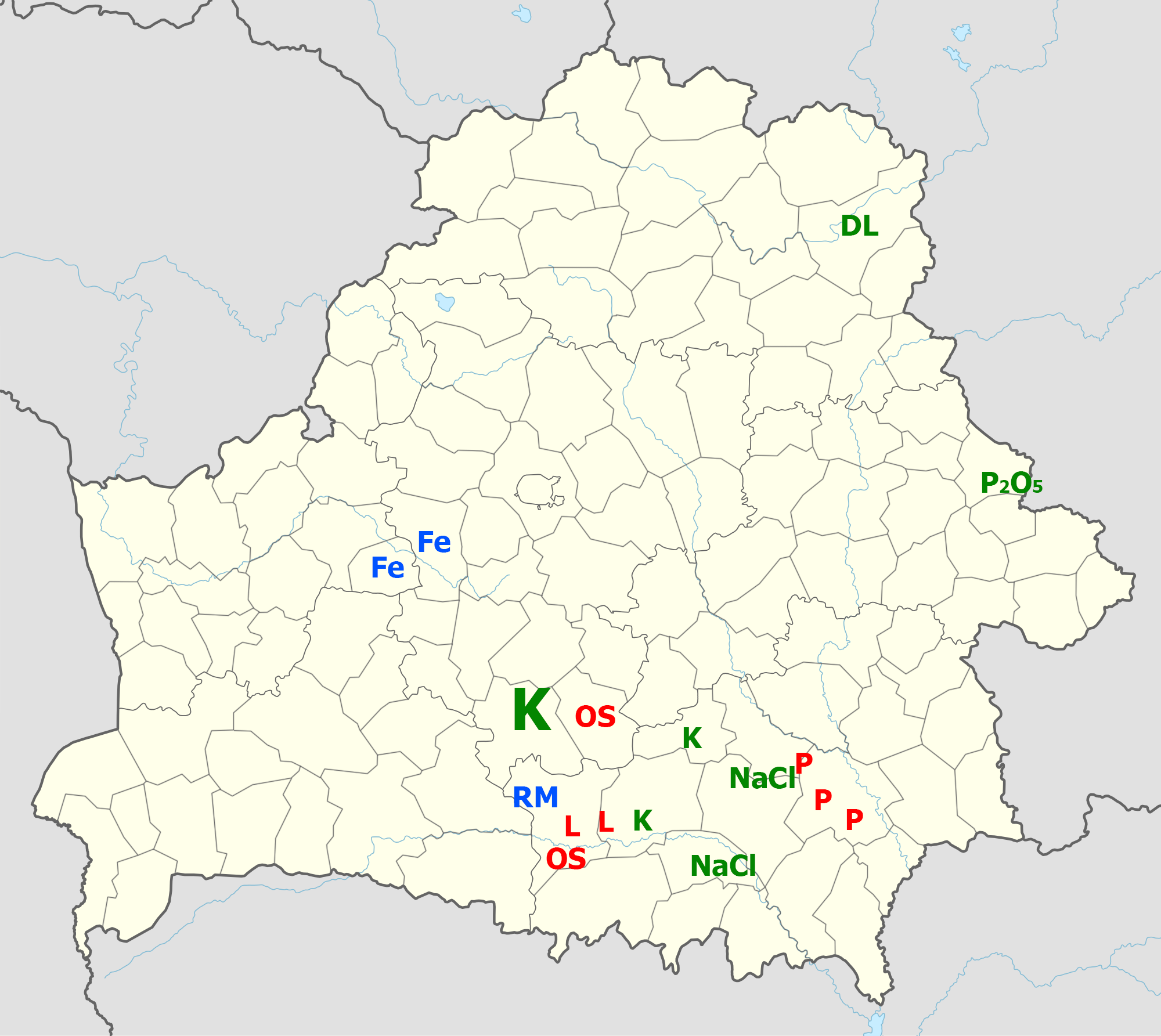
Metals are in blue (Fe — iron ore, RM — beryllium (leucophanite) with rare-earth metals); fossil fuels are in red (L — lignite, OS — oil shale, P — petroleum; peat is not shown); non-metallic minerals are in green (DL — dolomite, K — potash, NaCl — salt, P_{2}O_{5} — phosphorite).

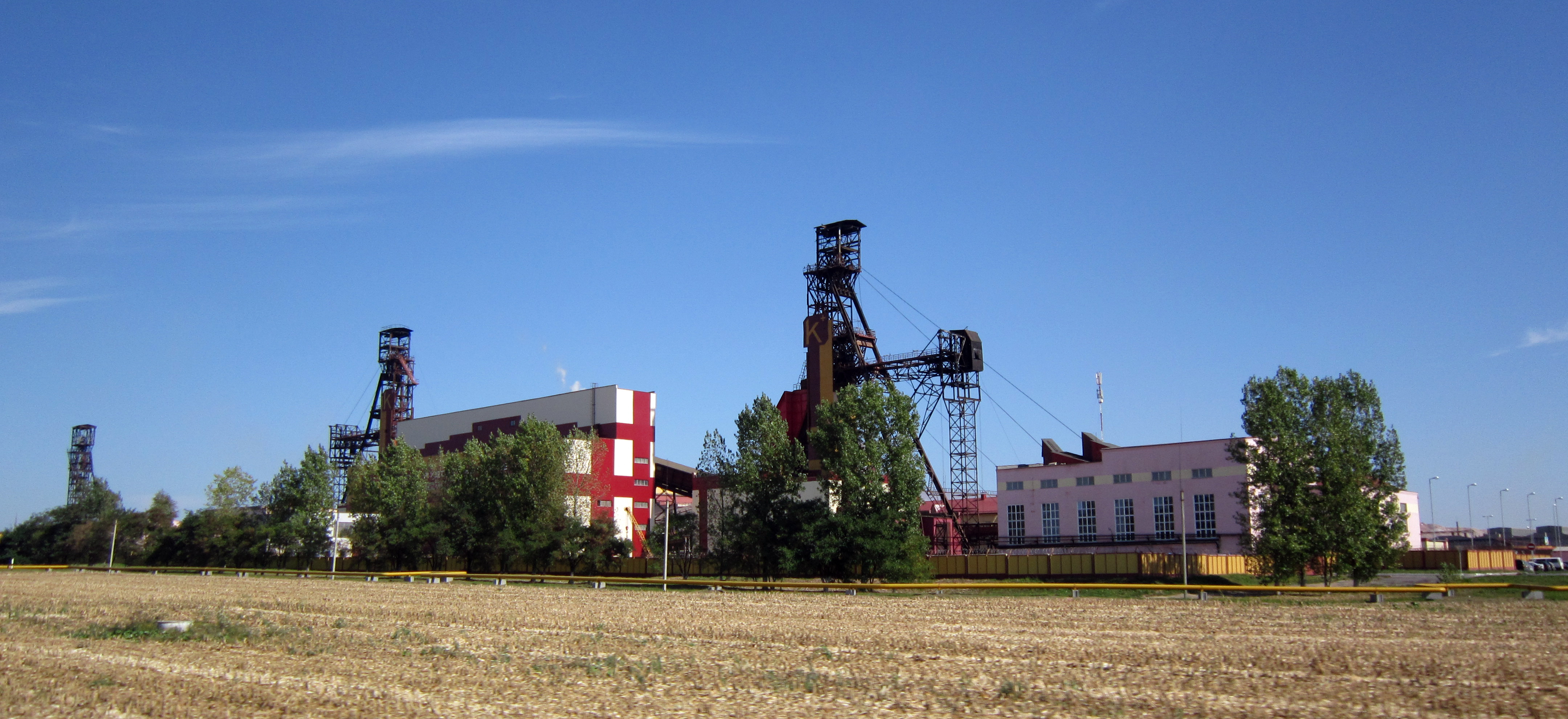
Potash mine near Salihorsk.

The natural resources of Belarus include timber, peat deposits, small quantities of oil and natural gas, granite, dolomitic limestone, marl, chalk, sand, gravel, clay, potash, and halite (salt).

=== Potash, halite and phosphorite ===
Belarus has a large number of potash deposits – all formed during the Famennian stage of the Late Devonian epoch – with commercial reserves of 10 billion metric tonnes. Three main potash deposits have been explored – Starobin (Belarusian: Старобінскае, Russian: Старобинское), Petrikov (Belarusian: Петрыкаўскае, Russian: Петриковское) and Oktyabrsky (Belarusian: Акцябрскае, Russian: Октябрьское). Sylvinite (potash ore) from these three deposits contains up to 28%, 40% and 39% KCl respectively. Amounts of MgCl_{2} vary from 0.15–0.3% in Starobin to 1.5–4% in Petrikov and more than 5% in Oktyabrsky. The Starobin deposit has 2.6 billion tonnes of proven reserves (A, B, C_{1} categories) and 600 million tonnes of prognosed reserves (C_{2} category) of potash. Reserves at the Petrikov deposit are estimated at 2.12 billion tonnes (C_{1} and C_{2} categories) of potash. The Oktyabrsky deposit has 637 million tonnes of potash (C_{1} and C_{2}) and 1.1 billion tonnes of carnallite. Only the Starobin deposit is used, but in 2014 construction of the first factory in the Petrikov deposit began. Several smaller, less-explored deposits are known, mainly in Gomel and Minsk Regions.

Large halite (salt) deposits were formed during Frasnian and Famennian stages of the Late Devonian epoch. Saliferous formations cover 26,000 km^{2} in the southeastern part of the country. Three deposits have been explored – Starobin (in Minsk Region), Mazyr and Davydaŭskaje (both in Gomel Region). The Davydaŭskaje deposit is the biggest, with proven reserves over 20 billion tonnes, but only the Starobin and Mazyr deposits are used to produce salt. More than 350,000 tonnes of halite are mined in the Starobin deposit per year (2004). In the Mazyr deposit, the saliferous liquid is extracted via wells, and up to 360,000 tonnes of salt are produced annually (2004).

There are known phosphorite ore deposits near Mstsislaw, and in Labkovičy (Krychaw Raion) in eastern Belarus (Mogilev Region). They contain over 400 million tonnes of phosphorites (prognosed reserves: C_{1} and C_{2} categories). Two lesser deposits are known in Brest Region with prognosed reserves of 95 million tonnes. None of the deposits are used.

=== Fossil fuels ===
Due to the Belarus' high level of marshiness, it is very rich in peat. 9,191 peat deposits are known, totalling 5.7 billion tonnes of overall reserves. Before land improvement projects began in 20th century, peat covered 14% of Belarus. Although the country has no deposits of high-ranked coal, the amount of lower-ranked lignite is estimated at 553 million tonnes. Its average heat content is 25.2 MJ/kg. The amount of oil shale in southern Belarus is estimated at 8.8 billion tonnes with 3.6 billion in the Lyuban (Belarusian: Любанскае, Russian: Любанское) and Turaŭ (Belarusian: Тураўскае, Russian: Туровское) deposits alone. Oil shale lies at a depth of 66–600 m and deeper. The layer thickness of oil shale deposits is usually 0.1–3.7 m, and the average heat content is 6.7 MJ/kg. Belarusian oil shale was formed in Late Devonian and Early Carboniferous periods.

The southeastern part of Belarus has many small oil fields. The first oil deposit was discovered near Rechytsa in 1964. Belarus extracts about 1.8 million tonnes of oil per year, which provides 17–18% of country's needs (2004). Oil is usually found in the Late Devonian sediments and is frequently connected with salt layers, but two deposits are situated among the Late Proterozoic sediments.

=== Metals ===
Belarus has two big iron deposits – Akolaŭskaje (Okolovskoye; in Stowbtsy Raion), with 175 million tonnes of ore, and Navasiolkaŭskaje (Novosyolkovskoye; in Karelichy District), but neither is used. The Akolaŭskaje deposit lies 235–338 m under the surface with 24.5% of iron (Fe^{2+}, Fe^{3+}) in ore. The share of iron in ores from Navasiolkaŭskaje deposit varies from 16–52%. Ores from the latter deposit have significant amounts of titanium (up to 7% of TiO_{2}) and vanadium (up to 0.16% of V_{2}O_{5}). Several small deposits (ore occurrences) of copper (chalcopyrite, other copper-containing minerals and native copper) and aluminium (boxite-dawsonite) are known. Small deposits of rare earth elements are known in central and southern parts of the country, the biggest being Dyjabazavaye (Diabazovoye; in Zhytkavichy Raion), containing beryllium and rare earth elements.

=== Other minerals ===
Many marl and chalk deposits are mined, with large amounts being used to produce cement in Krychaw, Kastsyukovichy and Vawkavysk. Two large deposits of freestone are mined – in Mikashevichy (Luninets District) and in Hluškavičy (Lyelchytsy District). All Belarusian glassworks and brickworks use local sand and clay respectively. The biggest dolomite deposit is located near Vitebsk.

== Land use ==
Land use
- Arable land: 27.21%
- Permanent crops: 0.59%
- Other: 72.19% (2012)
Irrigated land
1,150 km^{2} (2003)
Total renewable water resources
58 km^{3} (2011)
Freshwater withdrawal (domestic/industrial/agricultural)
Total: 4.34 km^{3}/yr (32%/65%/3%)
Per capita: 435.4 m^{3}/yr (200p)
Water resources
About 10,800 rivers and streams, with the total length of 91,000 km, and about 11,000 lakes, including 470 lakes with an area exceeding 0.5 km^{2} each. Lake Narach is the largest lake (79.2 km^{2}, the deepest point about 25 m). Significant amounts of swampy area, notably in the Polesie region.
