= Nyeharelaye rural council =

Nyeharelaye rural council is a lower-level subdivision (selsoviet) of Dzyarzhynsk district, Minsk region, Belarus.
