= Dziamidavichy, Dzyarzhynsk district rural council =

Demidovichy Rural Council on the map of Dzerzhinsky District, Minsk Region, Belarus

Dziamidavichy rural council is a lower-level subdivision (selsoviet) of Dzyarzhynsk district, Minsk region, Belarus.
