= Fanipal rural council =

Fanipal rural council is a lower-level subdivision (selsoviet) of Dzyarzhynsk district, Minsk region, Belarus.
