= Putchyna rural council =

Putchyna rural council is a lower-level subdivision (selsoviet) of Dzyarzhynsk district, Minsk region, Belarus.

== Rural localities ==
The populations are from the 2009 Belarusian census and 2019 Belarusian census

Russian name	Belarusian name	Pop. 2009	Pop. 2019
Путчинский сельсовет	Путчынскі сельсавет	2544	2067
д Антоновщина	в Антонаўшчына	9	5
д Василевщина	в Васілеўшчына	17	16
д Вертники	в Вертнікі	67	38
аг Волма	аг Волма	392	303
д Волмечка	в Валмечка	24	19
д Воловники	в Валоўнікі	27	20
д Гарутишки	в Гаруцішкі	75	73
д Глушинцы	в Глушынцы	3	1
д Голышово	в Галышова	22	17
д Гринкевичи	в Грынкевічы	16	19
д Денисовщина	в Дзянісаўшчына	11	10
д Житное	в Жытнае	-	-
д Загайно	в Загайна	-	-
д Заречное	в Зарэчнае	26	34
д Золотари	в Залатары	5	2
д Каменка	в Каменка	3	-
д Ковальцы	в Кавальцы	57	36
д Ковшово	в Каўшова	27	15
д Леонцы	в Лявонцы	7	4
д Липки	в Ліпкі	9	9
д Ласицковщина	в Ласіцкаўшчына	10	10
д Меньки	в Мянькі	38	29
д Мироны	в Міроны	48	45
д Михалевщина	в Міхалеўшчына	18	12
д Михалово	в Міхалова	7	9
д Наквасы	в Наквасы	4	9
д Нарейки	в Нарэйкі	16	7
д Наследники	в Наследнікі	37	28
д Падеричи	в Падзерычы	7	3
д Перетятки	в Перацяткі	22	15
д Поедынково	в Паедынкова	9	-
д Путчино	в Путчына	43	31
аг Путчино	аг Путчына	538	584
д Рудевщина	в Рудзеўшчына	8	3
д Садовщина	в Садоўшчына	17	12
д Саковичи	в Саковічы	44	46
д Свидовщина	в Свідоўшчына	64	48
аг Скирмантово	аг Скірмантава	617	422
д Скоробогатовщина	в Скарабагатаўшчына	32	16
д Суртины	в Сурціны	14	15
п Татарщина	п Татаршчына	3	4
д Тюхаи	в Цюхаі	31	25
п Феликсово	п Феліксова	8	7
д Химороды	в Хімарады	9	2
х Шитолевщина	х Шыталеўшчына	2	1
д Шишки	в Шышкі	6	4
д Щепки	в Шчэпкі	3	1
д Юрковичи	в Юркавічы	39	25
д Юхновичи	в Юхнавічы	6	4
д Якуты	в Якуты	10	6
д Янковцы	в Янкоўцы	37	23
