= Dzyarzhynsk, Dzyarzhynsk district rural council =

Dzyarzhynsk rural council is a lower-level subdivision (selsoviet) of Dzyarzhynsk district, Minsk region, Belarus.
