= Nyeharelaye =

Nyeharelaye Негарэлае (Belarusian) Негорелое (Russian)
- Agrotown
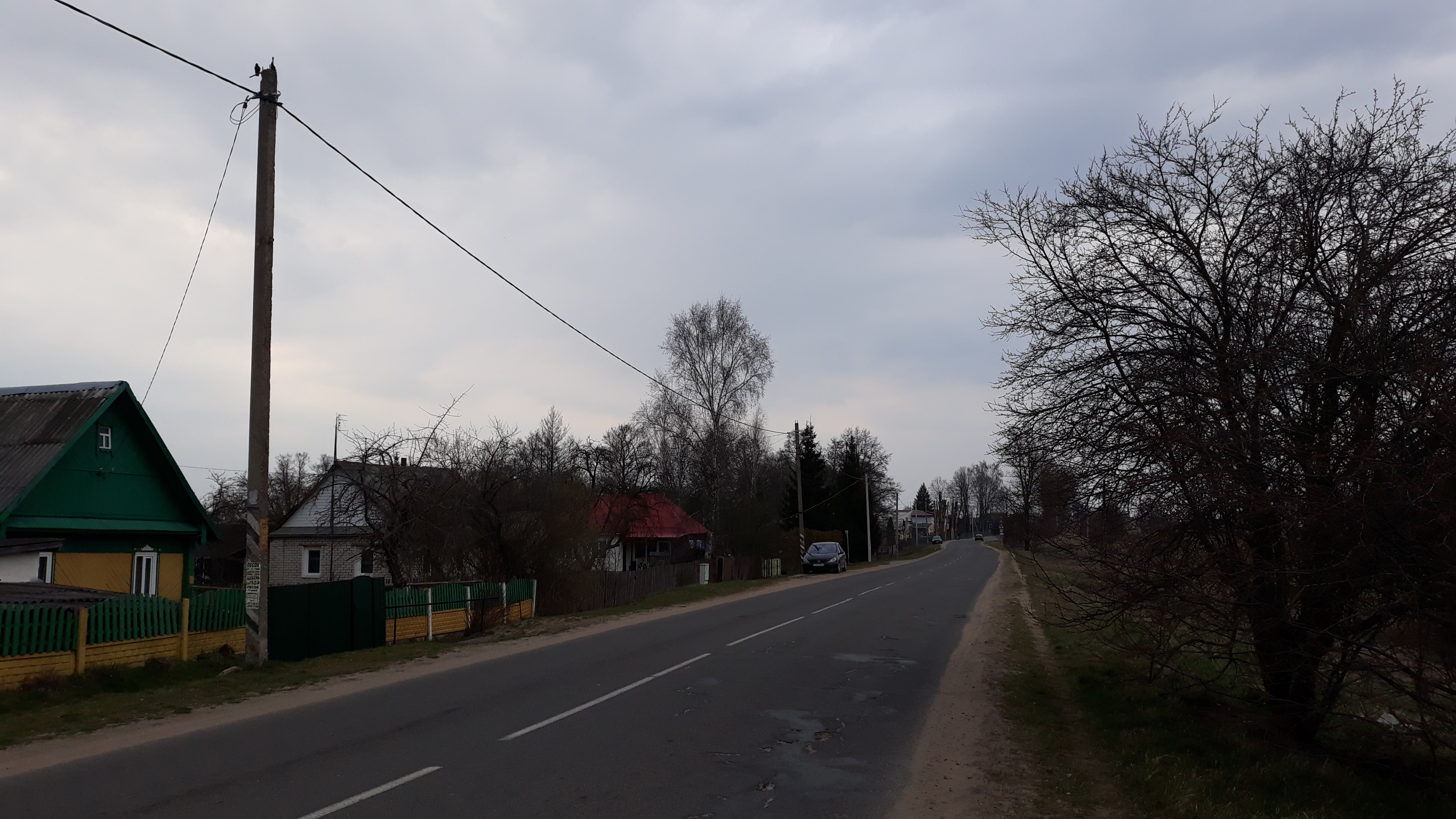
- View of the town

- Location within Belarus
- Coordinates: 53.6106°N 27.0706°E
- Country: Belarus
- Region: Minsk Region
- District: Dzyarzhynsk District

Population (2014)
  - Total: 821
- Time zone: UTC+3 (MSK)

Nyeharelaye or Negoreloe (Belarusian: Негарэлае, romanized: Nieharelaje; Russian: Негорелое, romanized: Negoreloye; Polish: Niehorele) is an agrotown in Dzyarzhynsk District, Minsk Region, Belarus. Until 2009, it had the status of urban-type settlement.

== Geography ==
It is located on the river Peretut, 10 kilometres (6.2 mi) southwest of Dzyarzhynsk and 48 kilometres (30 mi) from Minsk.

== History ==
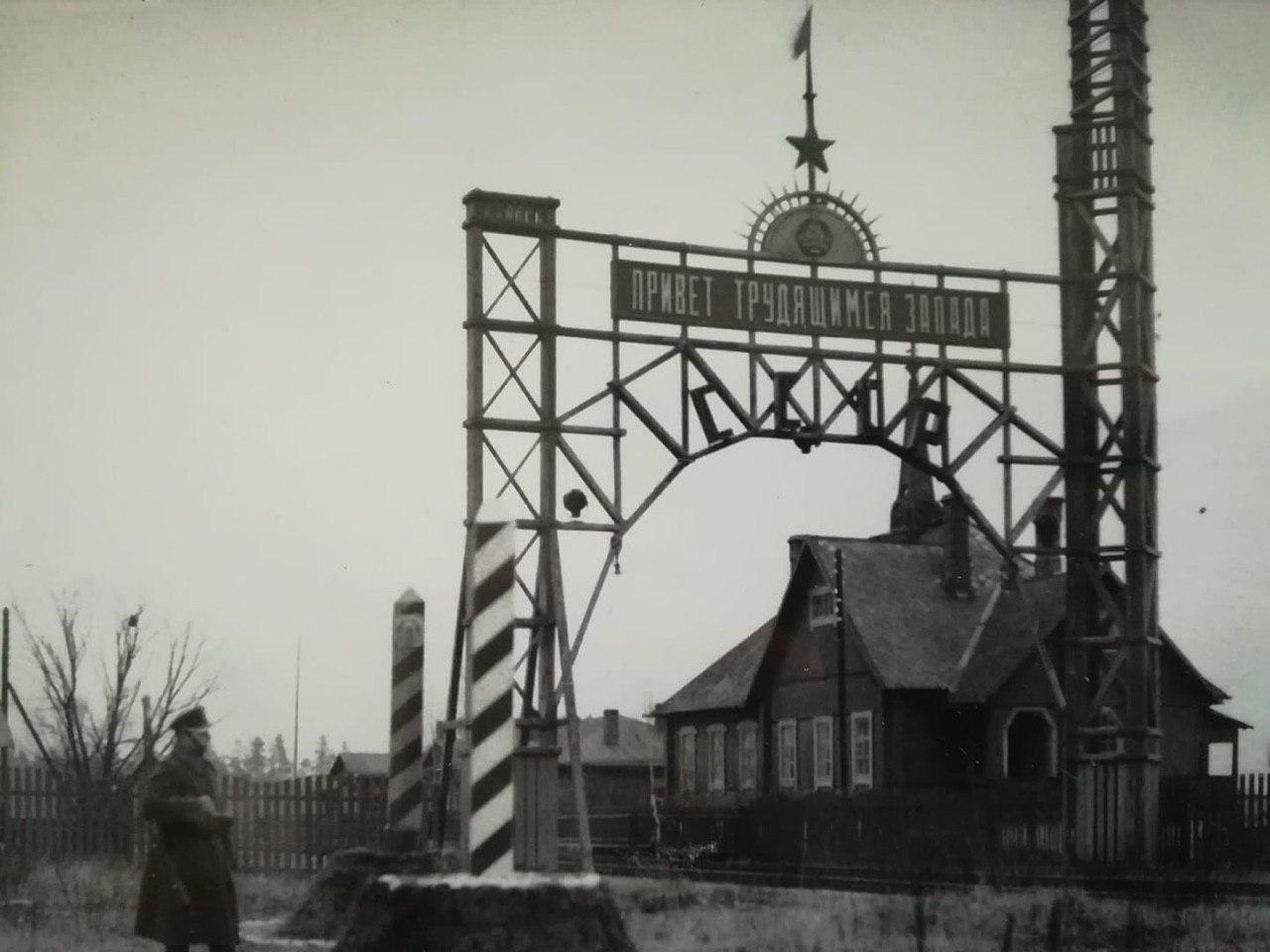
Interwar Polish-Soviet border with the train station

Known from the 16th century as a post station on the Minsk-Navahrudak route, when it was part of the Polish–Lithuanian Commonwealth. The settlement was part of the estates of the powerful Radziwiłł magnate family. In the Second Partition of Poland, in 1793, it was annexed by the Russian Empire. In the early 19th century, the village passed to the Abłamowicz family and, in 1879, to renown Polish numismatist Emeryk Hutten-Czapski. From 1871, it had a railway station, which in 1921-1939 was a Soviet border station on the border with Poland. During World War II, the settlement was under German occupation from 1941 to 1944, during which the vast majority of the town's Jewish population was murdered.

== Economics ==
There is a hive manufacturing factory as well as a private furniture manufacturer.
