= Dabrynyova rural council =

Dabrynyova rural council is a lower-level subdivision (selsoviet) of Dzyarzhynsk district, Minsk region, Belarus.
