= Skirmantava =

Agrotown in Minsk Region, Belarus

Skirmantava Скірмантава (Belarusian) Скирмантово (Russian)
- Agrotown
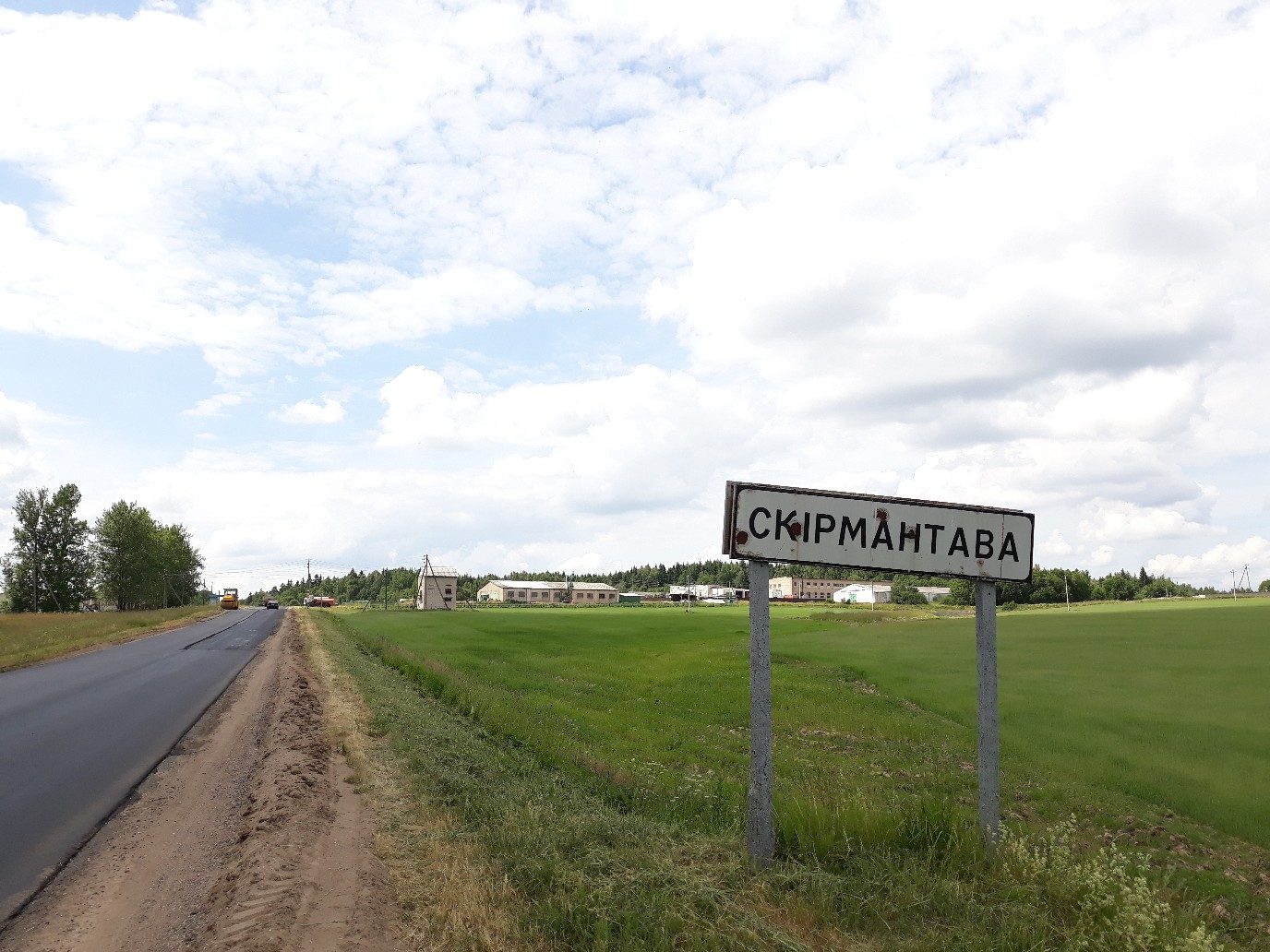

- Location within Belarus
- Coordinates: 53°50′23″N 27°03′20″E
- Country: Belarus
- Region: Minsk Region
- District: Dzyarzhynsk District

Population (2009)
  - Total: 617
- Time zone: UTC+3 (MSK)

Skirmantava (Belarusian: Скірмантава; Russian: Скирмантово, romanized: Skirmantovo) is an agrotown in Dzyarzhynsk District, Minsk Region, Belarus. It is administratively part of Putchina selsoviet. It is located 22 kilometres (14 mi) from Dzyarzhynsk and 49 kilometres (30 mi) from the capital Minsk. As of 2009, it has a population of 617.
