= Dzyarzhynskaya Hara =

Highest point in Belarus

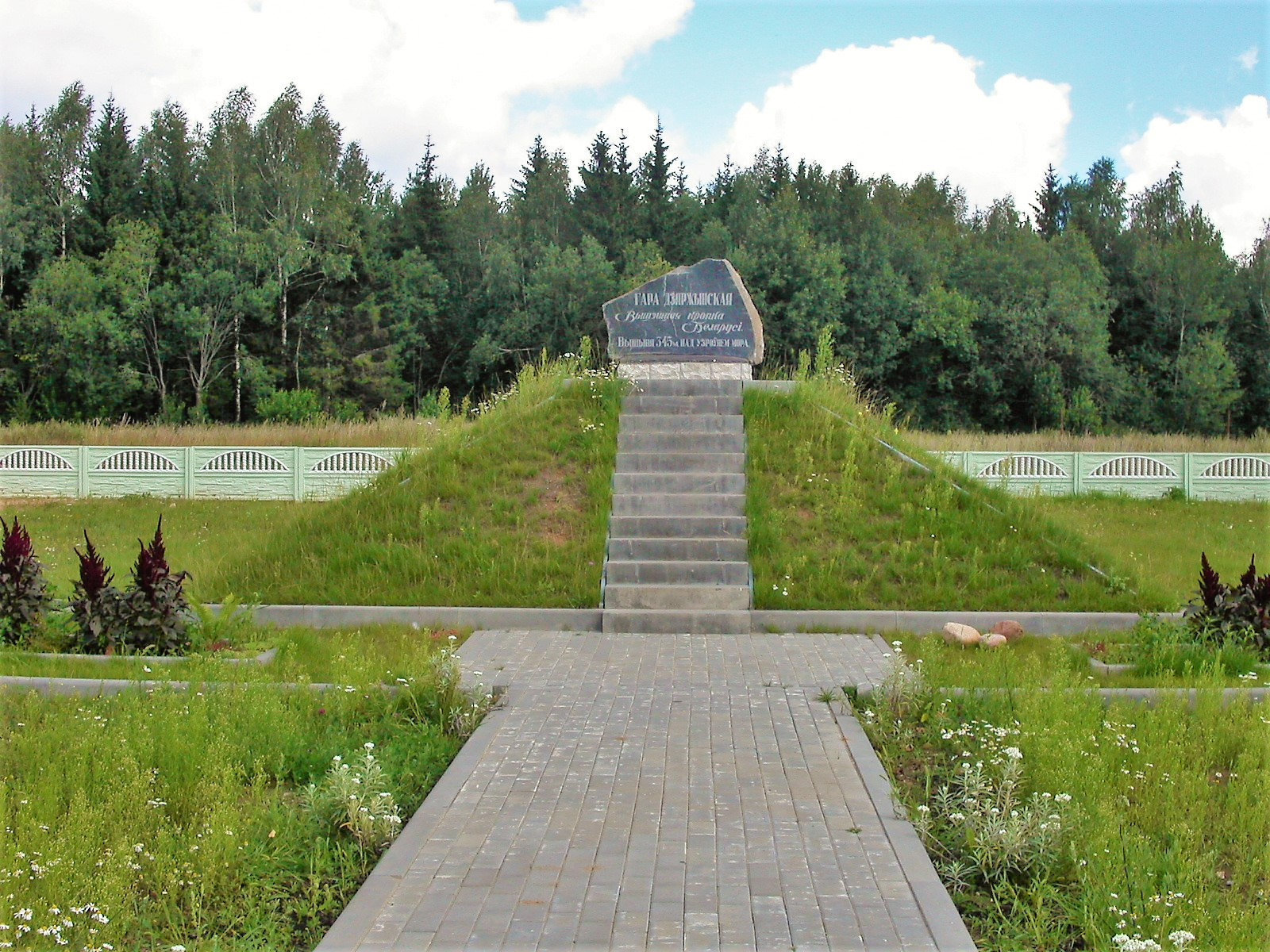

Highest point
- Elevation: 345 m (1,132 ft)
- Prominence: 185 m (607 ft)
- Isolation: 454.42 km (282.36 mi)
- Listing: Country high point
- Coordinates: 53°50′55″N 27°3′55″E

Geography
- Location within Belarus
- Location: Belarus

Geology
- Mountain type: Hill

Dzyarzhynskaya Hara (Belarusian: Дзяржынская гара, romanized: Dziaržynskaja hara, [dzʲarˈʐɨnskaja]) is the highest point in Belarus. The hill is 345 meters (1,130 ft) above sea level and is located west of the capital Minsk, near Dzyarzhynsk, in the village of Skirmantava. The original name of the hill was Svyataya hara (Belarusian: Святая гара, lit. 'holy mountain'). In 1958, the hill was renamed Dzyarzhynskaya hara, in honour of Soviet revolutionary and politician Felix Dzerzhinsky, the founder of the OGPU.

== See also ==
- Geography of Belarus
- Extreme points of Belarus
- List of highest points of European countries
- List of elevation extremes by country
