= Krychaw =

Town in Mogilev Region, Belarus

Krychaw Крычаў (Belarusian) Кричев (Russian)
- Town
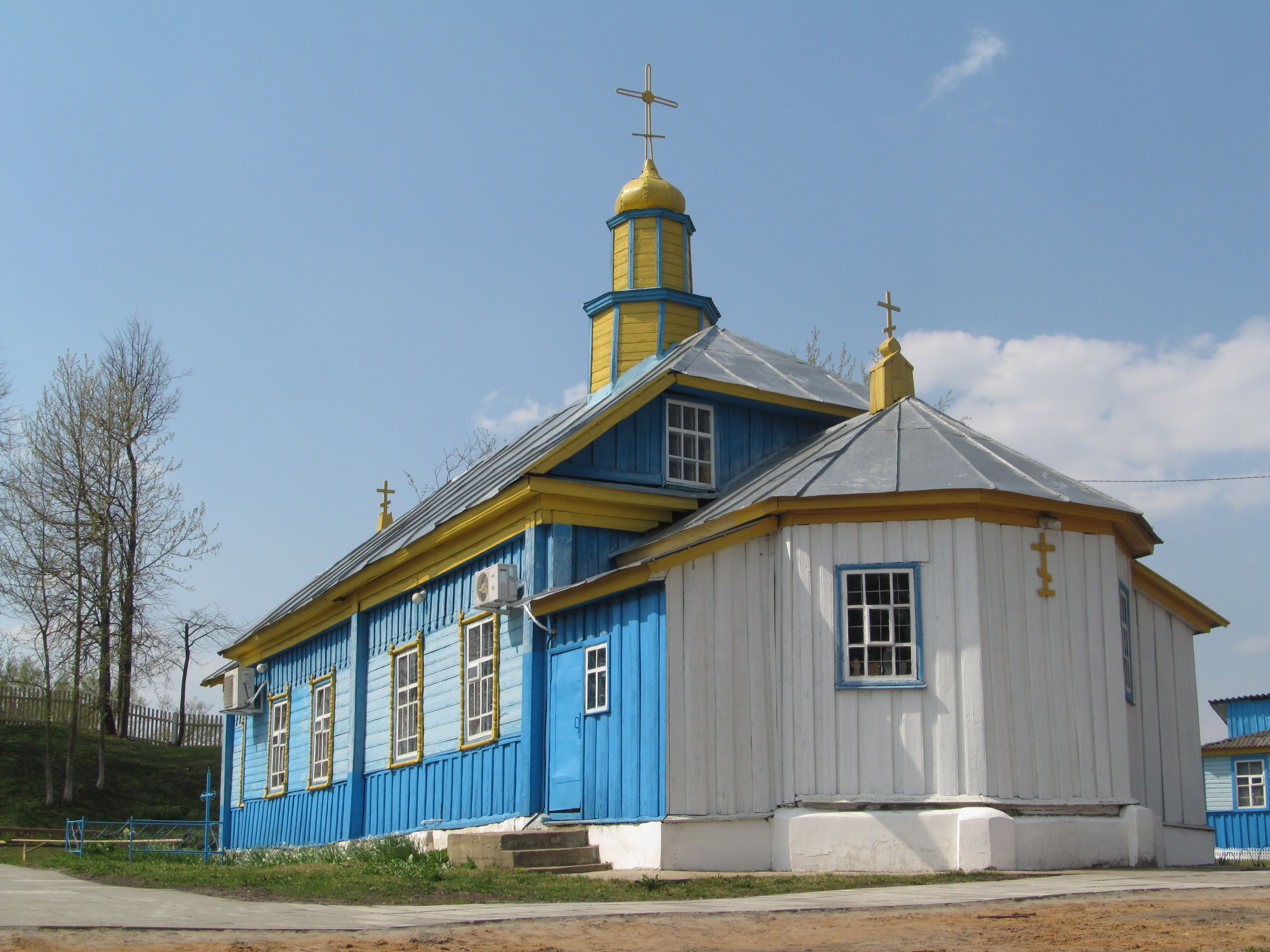
- Saint Nicholas Church

- Flag Coat of arms

- Location within Belarus
- Coordinates: 53°43′10″N 31°42′50″E
- Country: Belarus
- Region: Mogilev Region
- District: Krychaw District
- First mentioned: 1136

Area
  - Total: 10.7 km^{2} (4.1 sq mi)

Population (2025)
  - Total: 22,973
  - Density: 2,150/km^{2} (5,560/sq mi)
- Time zone: UTC+3 (MSK)
- Postal code: 213491-213496, 213498, 213500
- Area code: +375 1771
- License plate: 6
- Website: Official website

Krychaw or Krichev (Belarusian: Крычаў, romanized: Kryčaŭ, IPA: [ˈkrɨtʂau̯]; Russian: Кричев, IPA: [ˈkrʲitɕɪf], Polish: Krzyczew) is a town in Mogilev Region, in eastern Belarus. It serves as the administrative center of Krychaw District. It is situated on the Sozh River. In 2009, its population was 27,202. As of 2025, it has a population of 22,973.

== History ==
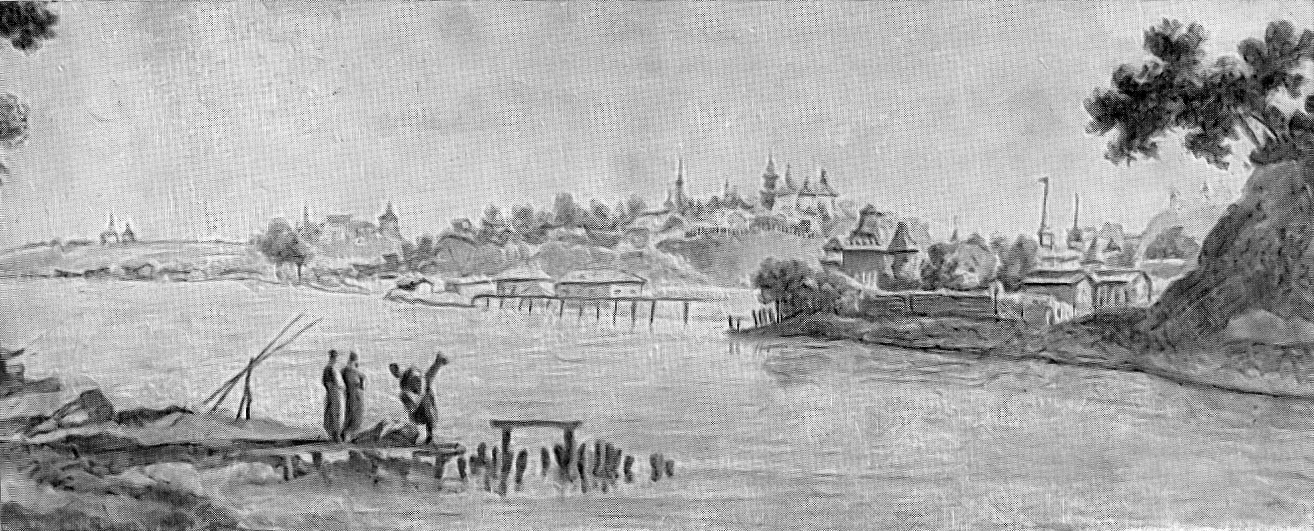
18th-century panorama

Krychaw is first mentioned in chronicles under the year 1136. In the Middle Ages, it was part of the Principality of Smolensk and Grand Duchy of Lithuania. In 1440, Casimir IV Jagiellon granted it to Prince Lengvenis. During the Lithuanian–Muscovite War of 1507–1508, Stanisław Kiszka defeated Muscovite invaders there in 1507. In 1535, it was burned down by Muscovite invaders. Afterwards it was quickly rebuilt being vested with various royal privileges, especially by King Władysław IV Vasa in 1634 and 1637. The privileges were confirmed by King John II Casimir Vasa in 1650, and further Kings afterwards. During the Polish–Russian War of 1654–1667, in 1664, it was the place of a battle between the Poles and the Russian invaders. King Charles XII of Sweden stopped in the town following his defeat in the Battle of Poltava during the Great Northern War.

During World War II, the town was occupied by Nazi Germany from July 1941 to September 1943. The occupiers operated a prison forced labour camp in the town.

The Soviet Air Force Krichev Air Base was located east of Krychaw during the Cold War.
