= Krychaw district =

District of Mogilev region, Belarus

Krychaw district: Крычаўскі раён (Belarusian); Кричевский район (Russian)
- District

Belarusian transcription(s)
  - Łacinka: Kryčaŭski rajon
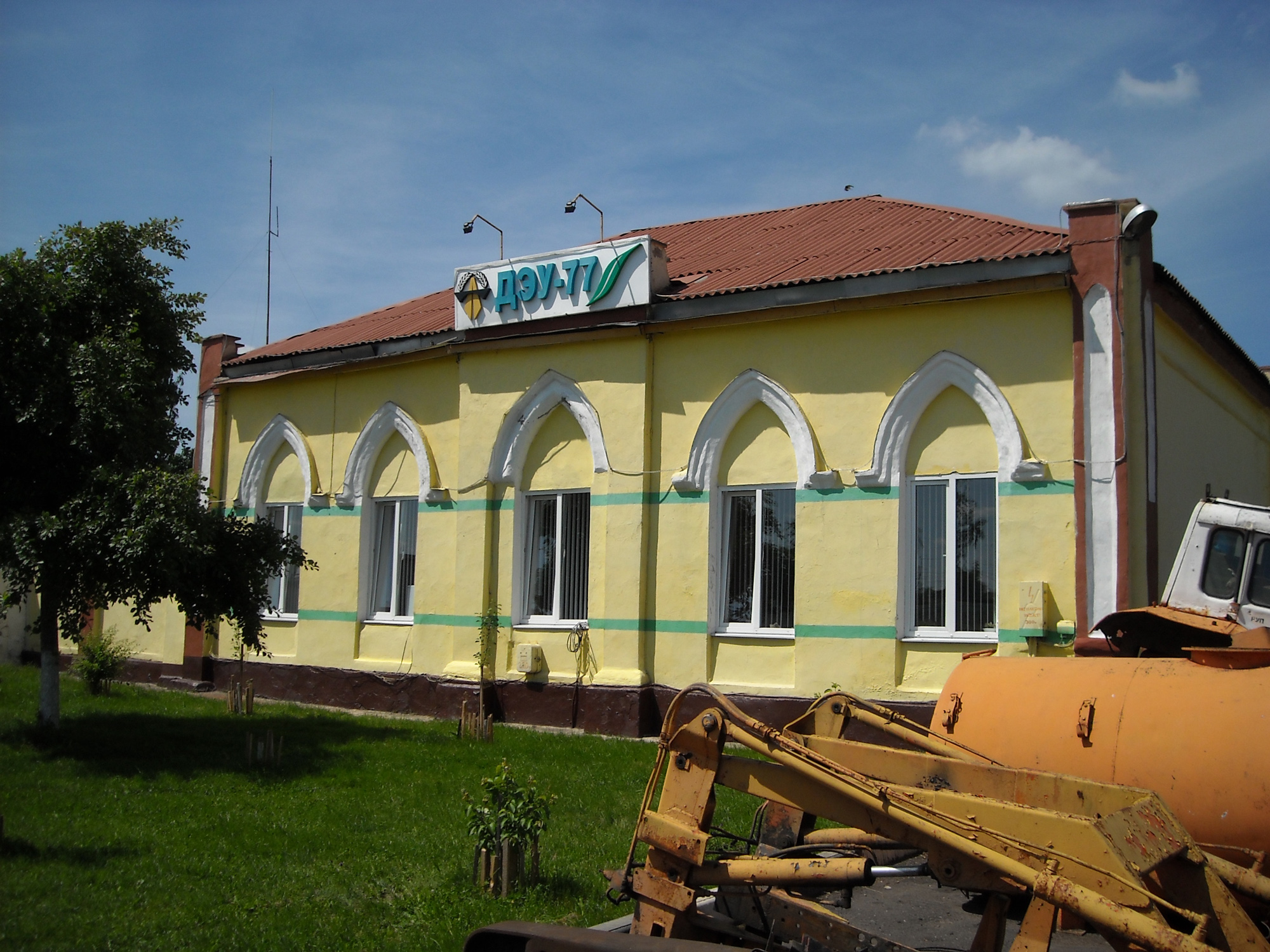
- Krychaw city post house

- Flag Coat of arms

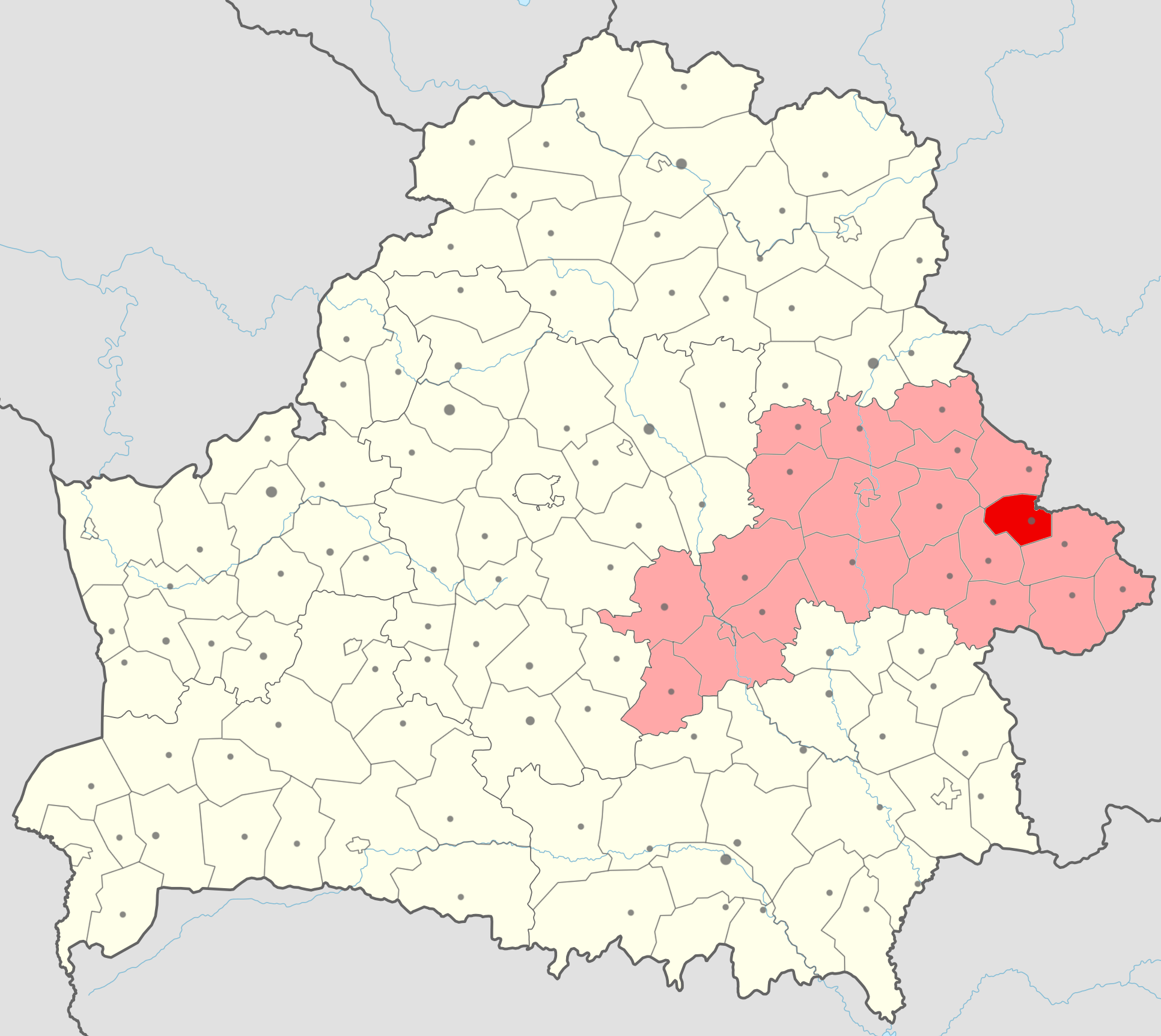
- Coordinates: 53°45′00″N 31°40′00″E
- Country: Belarus
- Region: Mogilev region
- Administrative center: Krychaw
- Elevation: 173 m (568 ft)

Population (2023)
  - Total: 28,150
- Time zone: UTC+3 (MSK)
- Website: krichev.gov.by

Krychaw district or Kryčaŭ district (Belarusian: Крычаўскі раён; Russian: Кричевский район, romanized: Krichevsky rayon) is a district (raion) of Mogilev region in Belarus. The administrative center of the district is the city of Krychaw. In 2009, its population was 35,133. The population of Krychaw accounted for 77.4% of the district's population.
