= Dzyarzhynsk =

Town in Minsk Region, Belarus

Dzyarzhynsk Дзяржынск (Belarusian) Дзержинск (Russian) Dzerzhinsk
- Town
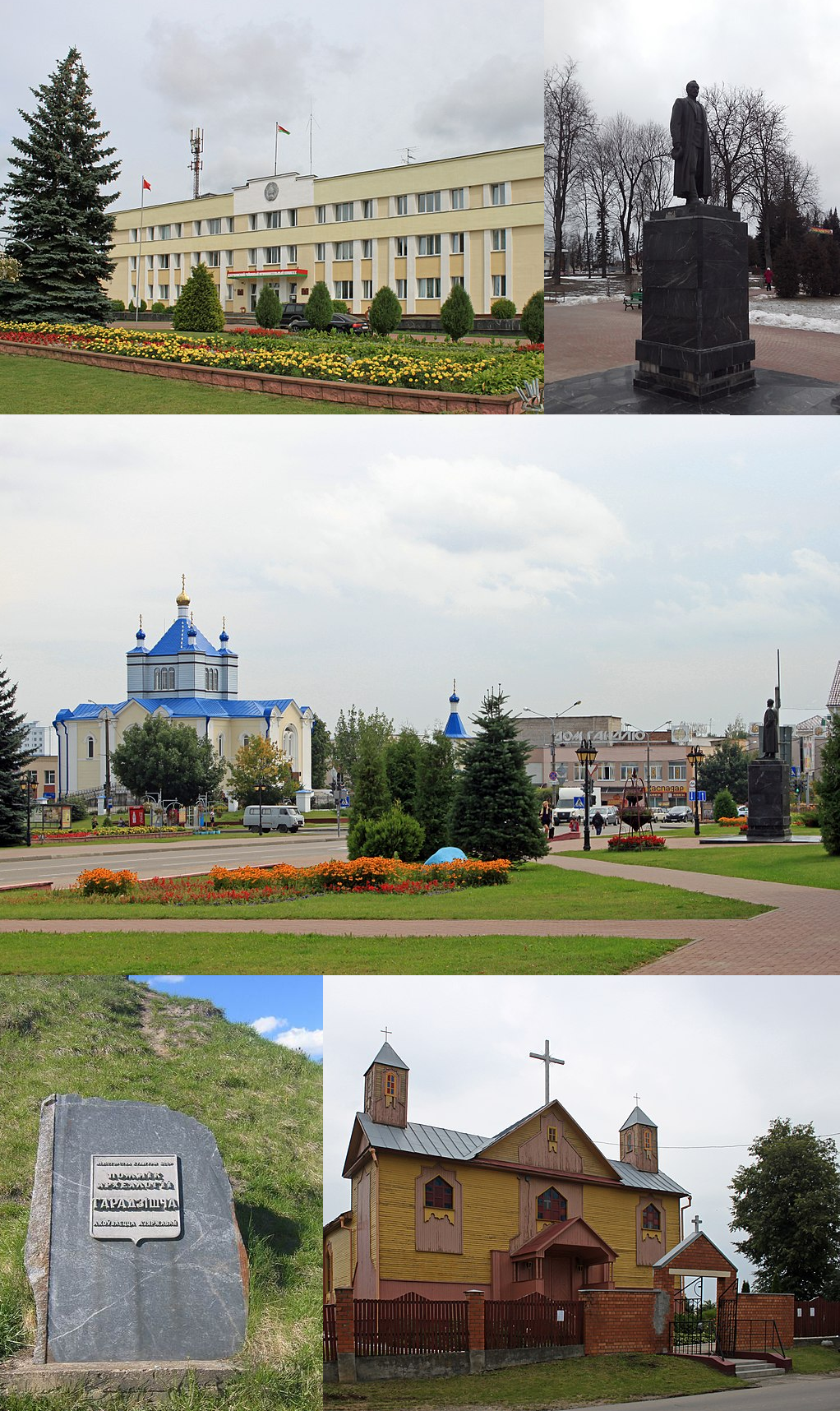

- Flag Coat of arms

- Location of Dzyarzhynsk in Belarus
- Coordinates: 53°41′00″N 27°08′00″E
- Country: Belarus
- Region: Minsk Region
- District: Dzyarzhynsk District
- Founded: 1146

Population (2026)
  - Total: 29,607
- Time zone: UTC+3 (MSK)
- Postal code: 222720
- Area code: +375 1716
- License plate: 5
- Website: Official website

Dzyarzhynsk, or Dzerzhinsk, (Note: Belarusian: Дзяржынск, romanized: Dziaržynsk; Russian: Дзержинск.) formerly known as Koydanava until 1932, (Note: Also Koidanov; Belarusian: Койданава, romanized: Kojdanava; Russian: Койданов, Койданово, romanized: Koydanov, Koydanovo; Polish: Kojdanów; Yiddish: קוידאַנאָוו, romanized: Koydanov; Lithuanian: Kaidanava.) is a town in Minsk Region, Belarus. It serves as the administrative center of Dzyarzhynsk District. As of 2026, it has a population of 29,607.

== History ==
In the Middle Ages, the village belonged to the Radziwiłłs, a Polish–Lithuanian aristocratic family.

=== Jewish community ===
Jews lived in Koidanova as early as 1620. Koidanova became the site of a new Hasidic Jewish dynasty in 1833 when Rabbi Shlomo Chaim Perlow (1797–1862) became the first Koidanover Rebbe. He was succeeded by his son, Rabbi Boruch Mordechai Perlow (1818–1870), grandson, Rabbi Aharon Perlow (1839–1897), and great-grandson, Rabbi Yosef Perlow of Koidanov-Minsk (1854-1915), who was the last Koidanover Rebbe to live in the town. After World War I, the dynasty was moved to Baranovichi, then in Poland.

In 1847, Koidanova had 2,497 Jewish inhabitants. In 1897, the city had a total population of 4,744, of whom 3,156 were Jews.

=== Inter-war period ===
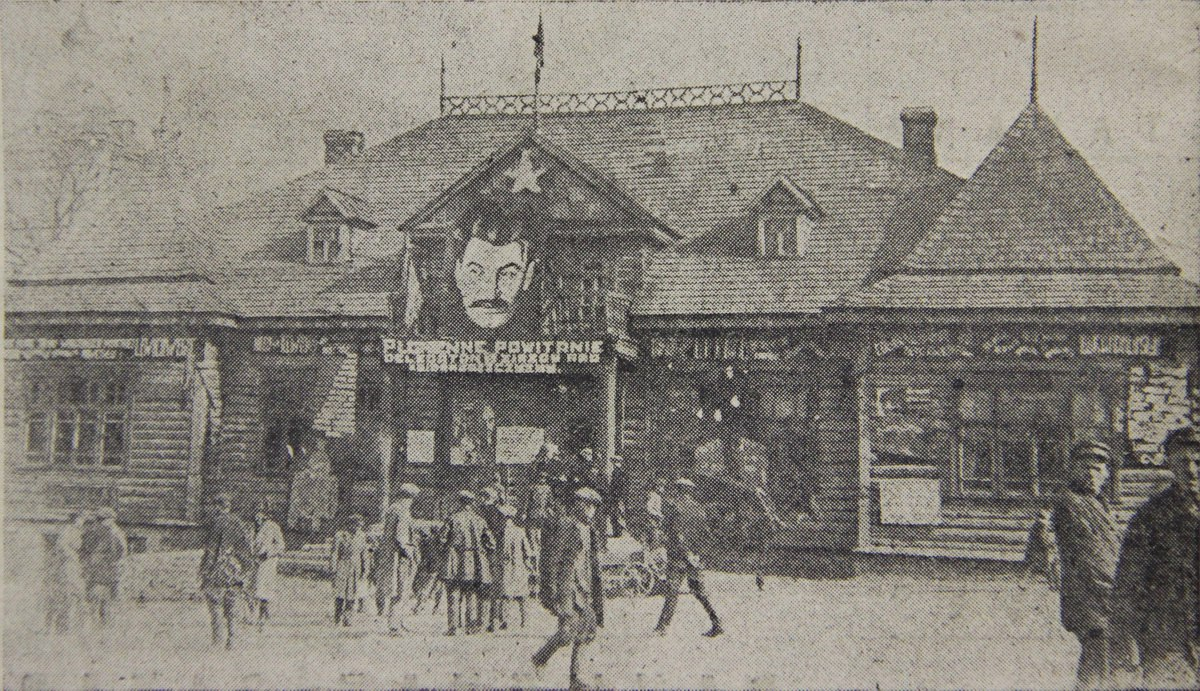
The People's House in Dzyarzhynsk, capital of the Dzierżyńszczyzna, in 1932

In May 1932, it was granted the status of a city and was renamed Koidanau (Belarusian: Ко́йданаў, romanized: Kojdanaŭ) or Koydanov (Russian: Ко́йданов, romanized: Koydanov). In June of that year it was renamed again as Dziaržynsk by the Communist authorities, in honour of Felix Dzerzhinsky (1877–1926), a famous Bolshevik creator and chief of the "Extraordinary Commission" (CHEKA) – the Soviet secret police - who was born in a Dziaržynava estate not far from the city, although on the other side of the then Polish-Soviet border.

The city was the capital of the short-lived Dzierzynszczyzna Polish Autonomous District during 1932–38.

=== World War II ===
It fell under German occupation during World War II. It was captured on 28 June 1941.

The Lithuanian Twelfth Schutzmannschaft (auxiliary police) Battalion's 1st Company, led by Lieutenant Z. Kemzura, massacred approximately 1,600 Jews from the city on 21 October 1941, shooting them and throwing them into a pit; many were buried alive. As it is reported in The Complete Black Book of Russian Jewry: "For three hours the earth covering the mass grave would move; people still alive were trying to crawl out of their grave." On 1–2 March 1942 the Einsatzgruppen transported several thousand Jews from throughout Belarus and murdered them in Koidanov. The city was liberated by the Soviet Red Army on 6 July 1944.

=== Modern day ===
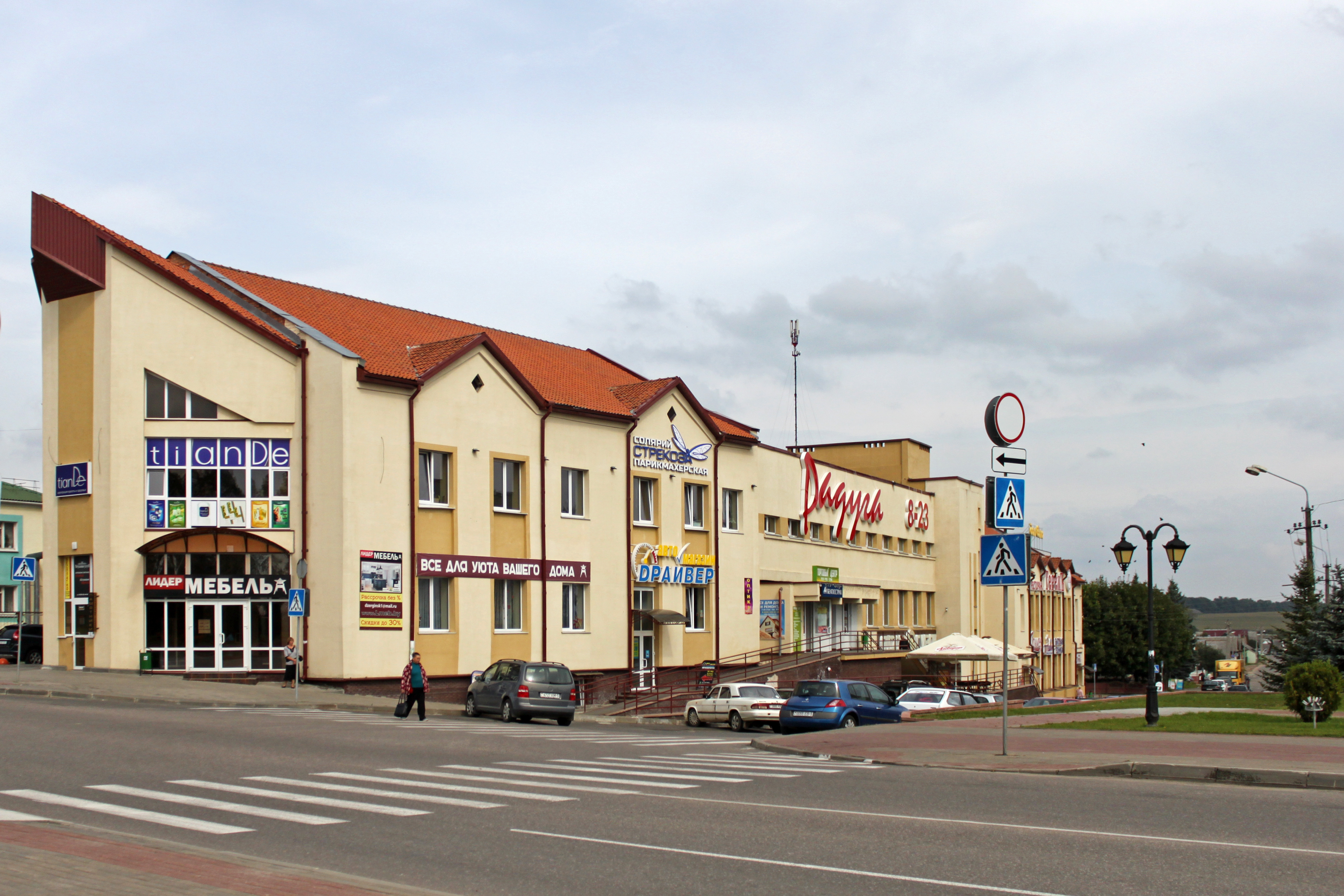
Shopping centre in Dzyarzhynsk

In 1998, the city had 24,700 inhabitants.

Now part of Belarus, the name Kojdanava (Belarusian: Койданава) is becoming popular again (it is the official name for the railway station of Dzyarzhynsk), but the official name remains unchanged.

== Geography ==
The highest point of Belarus, Dzyarzhynskaya Hara, is several kilometers from Dzyarzhynsk.

== Transport ==
There is a rail route across the city from Minsk Passazhirsky to Baranovichi Polesskie.

There is only one bus route in Dziarzhynsk; there are 18 stops.

== Sport ==
The local football club is the Arsenal Dzerzhinsk, playing in the Belarusian First League. Its home ground is the City Stadium.

== Notable residents ==
- Avrom Reyzen (1876–1953), Yiddish writer, poet, and editor
- Joseph Schlossberg (1875–1971), American labor union activist
- Aharon Perlow (1839–1897) – third rebbe of Koidanov
- Karol Hutten-Czapski, Leliwa coat of arms, (1860-1904). Polish Count and philanthropist. President of Minsk, Lithuania (1890-1901)
- Emeryk Hutten-Czapski, Leliwa coat of arms, (1828–1896). Polish Count, scholar, ardent historical collector and numismatist
- Adam Globus (born 1958). Belarusian writer, poet, artist, and publisher.
- Abram Krol (1913 – 1990). Belarusian painter. He worked in the landscape and thematic genres. He was an experimentalist in landscape painting. He used a spatula, creating soft, colored and achromatic stretches, and made extensive use of individual brushstrokes.
- Nikolai Savik (born 1937). Belarusian cyberneticist and publicist. He participated in the creation of the first multiprogram computing system in the USSR, Minsk-22. The equipment developed with his participation functioned on spacecraft and space stations.
- Artur Volsky (1924 – 2002). Belarusian novelist, screenwriter, poet, translator, and playwright. Author of poetry collections, plays, fairy tales, and a film script. Author of poetry, prose, and children's fairy tales. He translated from Russian, Ukrainian, Lithuanian, Latvian, German, and Hebrew.
- Nikolai Mitskevich (1914–1991). Belarusian physical chemist. His scientific works focused on the kinetics of organic matter oxidation processes. He developed methods for synthesizing diatomic phenols and halogenated aromatic acids.
- Iosif Livshits (1904–1997). Belarusian hydrologist. He conducted research on the hydrology of rivers and wetlands, as well as the water balance of Belarus. He also authored scientific and methodological works.
- Anatoly Kozhushkov (1921–1992). Belarusian historian and PhD in history. He studied the development of capitalist relations in Belarusian agriculture and the development of university education in the Byelorussian SSR. He authored several monographs on the history of Belarusian State University.
- Ivan Shpilevsky (1891 – 1941). Belarusian historian and local historian. His works were published in publications such as "Krasny Flot," "Nash Krai," and others. He also wrote several works on the history of the city of Dzerzhinsk.
- Alexander Kulikovsky (born 1906). Belarusian scientist specializing in peat extraction mechanization. He researched the production of granulated peat-mineral fertilizers.
