= Dzyarzhynsk district =

District of Minsk region, Belarus

Dzyarzhynsk district Дзяржынскі раён (Belarusian) Дзержинский район (Russian)
- District
- Flag Coat of arms

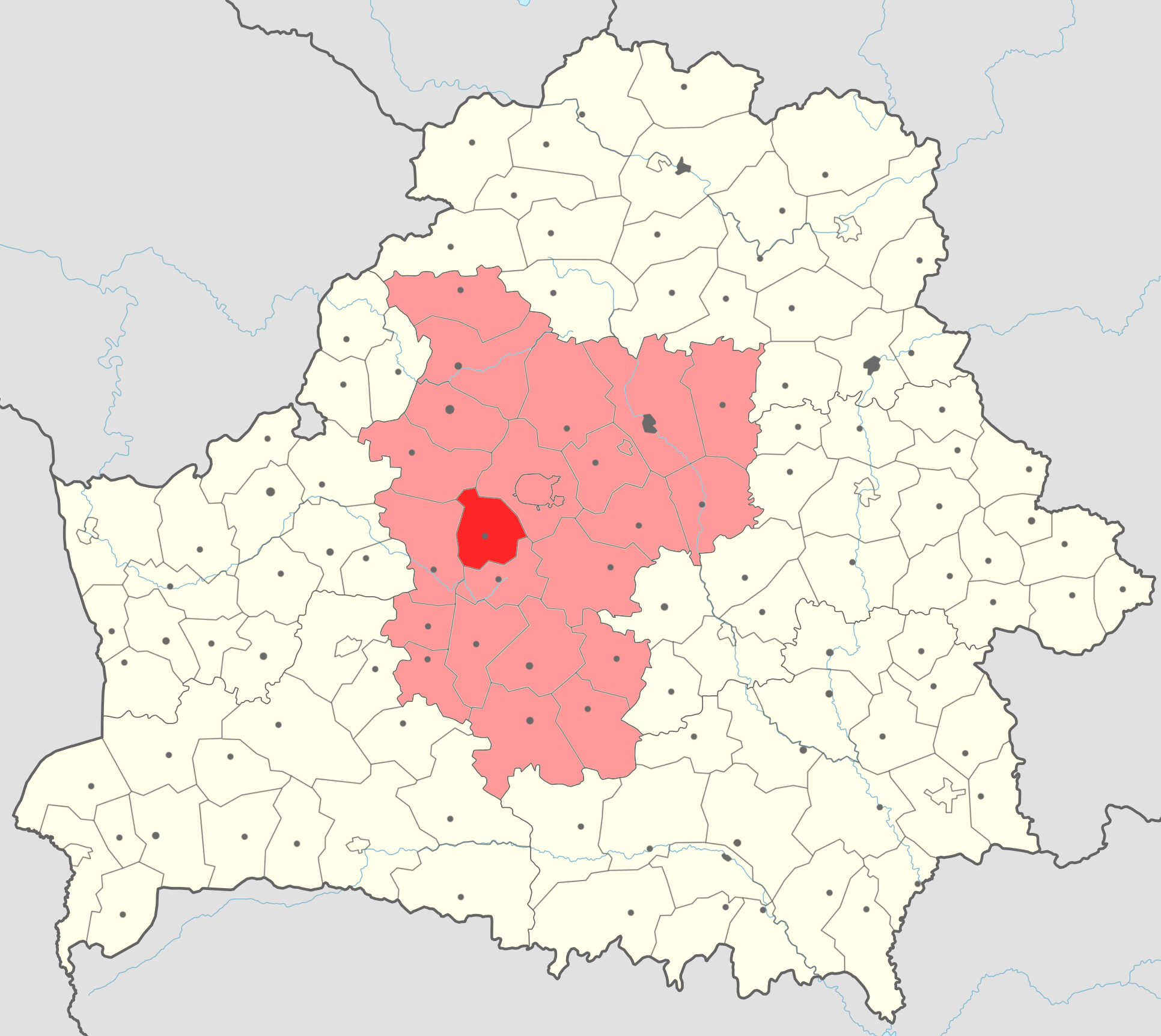
- Coordinates: 53°41′N 27°08′E
- Country: Belarus
- Region: Minsk region
- Administrative center: Dzyarzhynsk

Area
  - District: 1,200 km^{2} (460 sq mi)

Population (2024)
  - District: 70,391
  - Density: 59/km^{2} (150/sq mi)
  - Urban: 48,048
  - Rural: 22,343
- Time zone: UTC+3 (MSK)
- Website: Dzyarzhynsk ispolkom website

Dzyarzhynsk district or Dziaržynsk district (Belarusian: Дзяржынскі раён; Russian: Дзержинский район) is a district (raion) of Minsk region in Belarus. The administrative center of the district is Dzyarzhynsk. As of 2024, it has a population of 70,391.

The highest point of Belarus is situated in the district. It is 345 meters above level sea and called Dzyarzhynskaya Hara.

== See also ==
=== Cities ===
- Dzyarzhynsk
- Fanipal

=== Urban-type settlements ===
- Nyeharelaye

=== Agrotowns ===
- Skirmantava

== Notable residents ==
- Emeryk Hutten-Czapski (1828–1896), scholar, ardent historical collector and numismatist
- Karol Hutten-Czapski (1860-1904), businessman and philanthropist, Mayor of Minsk between 1890 and 1901
- Mikałaj Ułaščyk (1906, Vickaǔščyna village – 1986), Belarusian historian and archaeologist specialising in medieval history, a Gulag prisoner
- Mikola Yermalovich (1921, Malyja Navasiolki – 2000) was a Belarusian writer and historian
- Mother of Sergei Glushko, Russian actor, singer and fitness model
