= Leliwa coat of arms =

Polish coat of arms

Leliwa
- Battle cry: Leliwa
- Alternative names: Leliwa, Leliwczyk, Leliwita
- Earliest mention: 1324 (seal), 1399 (record)
- Cities: Dubno, Kalush, Mińsk Mazowiecki, Sieniawa, Stryków, Tarnopol, Tarnobrzeg, Tarnów, Trembowla, Przeworsk
- Gminas: Gmina Krzywcza
- Families: 830 names A Abaszkiewicz, Abramowicz, Adamkiewicz, Adamkowicz, Adamowicz, Aksan, Aksanow, Albicki, Alechnowicz, Anczewski, Andrzejewicz, Anszewski, Antoniewski, Antoszewski, Anusiewicz, Anuszewicz, Anuszewski. B Babczyński, Babiński, Bacewicz, Bachrynowski, Badkowski, Bagarewicz, Bagrycewicz, Bahrynowicz, Bahrynowski, Bajer, Bakrynowski, Baluczyński, Bałuczyński, Barancewicz, Baranowicz, Bartkowski, Bassowski, Baszowski, Bauer, Baur, Baurski, Bądkowski, Bedliński, Bereziński, Bernatowicz, Bes, Besowski, Będzimirowski, Bękowski, Białas, Białobłocki, Białopiotrowicz, Białoszycki, Bielicki, Bielowski, Bieniewski, Błocki, Błudnicki, Błudowski, Bobiński, Bobola, Boboński, Boczkowski, Bodzanowski, Bodzanta, Bodzewski, Bolcewicz, Bolte, Bonuchowski, Borzuchowski, Bóbr, Brandt, Brażewski, Brażyński, Brăescu, Bremer, Broniewski, Bryżyński, Brzeszewski, Brzozdowski, Brzozogajski, Budiło, Budzewicz, Budziewicz, Bujwid, Bukowiecki, Bułajewski, Bułhak, Bułhal, Bułharowski, Burakowski, Buywid, Byszewski, Bytoński. C Cebrzyk, Centomirski, Cerkas, Chełmowski, Chleb, Chlebowicz, Chłasiewicz, Chłasko, Chłopecki, Chmielewski, Chmurzyński, Choberski, Choborski, Chociatowski, Chrościcki, Chrucki, Chruścicki, Chryściński, Cichiński, Cichowicz, Cichowski, Cidzik, Ciszkowski, Cudzinowicz, Czachowski, Czacki, Czaiński, Czajęcki, Czajkowski, Czajowski, Czapiewski, Czapkowski, Czapski, Czarnecki, Czarnicki, Czarnołęski, Czawszajewicz, Czawszkiewicz, Czechowicz, Czechowski, Czehryński, Czejłytko, Czelatycki, Czelatyński, Czerczycki, Czerkas, Czerkies, Czernczycki, Czeski, Czeyłytko, Czobor, Czubicki, Czubiński, Czubowski, Czudzinowicz, Czulski, Czuprynowski, Czybiński. D Dackiewicz, Daćkiewicz, Damerau, Damerkaw, Danecki, Danilewicz, Daniła, Daniło, Daniłowicz, Darnowski, Daszczenko, Daszkowski, Dawidowicz, Dąb, Dąbrowski, Dewejn, Długołęcki, Dłużniowski, Dobaniewski, Dobrzański, Dobrzyński, Dokurno, Dorohostajski, Dorpowski, Dowejn, Dowgiałło, Dowgiało, Drasławski, Dreszkowski, Drowdwiłło, Drublański, Drzeczkowski, Duchowicz, Dudziecki, Dusejko, Dusieyko, Duszkiewicz, Dymitrowski, Dyrżewicz, Dyszewicz, Dziewiętnicki, Dzieża, Dziubiński, Dżur. E Ezofowicz. F Fersen, Francuzewicz, Francuzowicz, Freiman-Ostaniewicz, Fryjewicz. G Gabriałowicz, Gabryałowicz, Ganglowski, Gangłowski, Gaugłowski, Gawłowski, Gąglawski, Gągławski, Geczewski, Gesztowt-Łokiański, Giecewicz, Gieczewicz, Gieczewski, Gierłowicz, Gierszod, Gierzad, Giesztołd, Giesztowt łokiański, Gietowć, Gietowt, Gintowt, Gintowt-Dziewałtowski, Girowski, Gliński, Goleniewski, Goleniowski, Gołuchowski, Gordziałkowski, Gorka, Gorkański, Gortatowski, Gotartowski, Gozdzki, Górka, Górkański, Graniewski, Granowski, Grell, Grochowski, Grunowski, Gurkowski, Gurnowski, Gwiazdowski. H Hanusowski, Haraszkiewicz, Haustein, Hegel, Hegliński, Herżod, Hlaska, Hleb, Hlebicki, Hlebowicz, Hłaska, Hłasko, Horn, Hortyński, Howig, Hubal. I Ibiański, Iłłakowicz, Irzykiewicz, Irzykowicz, Iwonicz, Iwowicz. J Jacewicz, Jachimowicz, Jackiewicz, Jacosławski, Jaczewski, Jaczyntowicz, Jagielnicki, Jagintowicz, Jahelnicki, Jahołkowski, Jakowicz, Jaksmanicki, Jaksmański, Janecki, Janisławski, Jankiewicz, Janowicz, Jarosławowicz, Jarosławski, Jaroszewicz, Jaskmanicki, Jaskold, Jaskołd, Jawsza, Jawszowicz, Jelec, Jelowski, Jerzyk, Jerzykowicz, Jeżowski, Joachimowicz, Jotkiewicz, Józefowicz, Jucewicz, Juchniewicz, Juchnowicz, Judinowicz, Juniewicz, Junowicz, Jurkowski, Juskiewicz, Juszkiewicz, Juśkiewicz. K Kadziński, Kadzyński, Kalenicki, Kalenik, Kamieński, Kappel, Karaczowski, Karaszewicz, Karsznicki, Karśnicki, Karwacki, Kaski, Kasperowicz, Kaszański, Kewlicz, Kiersz, Kiewlicz, Kikowicz, Kirsz, Kirsza, Kisielowski, Kiski, Kiszelowski, Kiszkiewicz, Knipowicz, Koczanowski, Kokocki, Kolański, Komorski, Konczacki, Koniński, Konopiński, Kończacki, Kopestyński, Kopystyński, Korczyc, Korczycki, Korczyński, Korzeniewski, Korzeniowski, Kostewicz, Koszański, Kościa, Kościc, Kościewicz, Kotaszewicz, Kozicki, Kozielski, Kozieł, Koziełł, Kraiński, Krajewski, Krajowski, Krajski, Kraśnik, Krenz, Kronicki, Krosno, Krupka, Krysiński, Kryżan, Krzesz, Krzywiecki, Krzywięcki, Krzywobłocki, Księski, Kszyniecki, Kuchmistrzowicz, Kuchmistrzowski, Kuciński, Kukiel, Kumaniecki, Kummer, Kuniński, Kurczukowicz, Kurmin, Kurowski, Kuzmicki, Kwiatkowski. L Laskowski, Ledycki, Lejkowski, Lekszewicz, Leliwa, Lenkszewicz, Leonowicz, Lesieniewicz, Leskiewicz, Leśkiewicz, Lgocki, Lipański, Lipen, Lipeń, Lipień, Lipiński, Lisiecki, Lisowski, Lissowski, Liszeń, Liszyń, Lityński, Lostin, Ludkiewicz. Ł Łabcewski, Łabiewski, Łachoyski, Ładowski, Łakowicz, Łapszyński, Łaszkiewicz, Ławiński, Ławrynowicz, Łohojski, Łokiański-Gesztowt, Łopacki, Łosiew, Łostowski, Łoziński, Łubanka, Łukowski, Łyczkiewicz, Łysakowski. M Macewicz, Marcholenko, Marcinkiewicz, Marcinowicz, Margiewicz, Martynowicz, Martyszewski, Matusewicz, Matuszewic, Matuszewicz, Medeksza, Melsztyński, Meslicz, Miaskowski, Miastkowski, Micewicz, Michałowski, Mickiewicz, Mierciński, Mierczyński, Mierzeński, Mierzyński, Mikulicz, Minejko, Mineyko, Minwid, Mislicz, Miszkiewicz, Mitko, Młaszkowski, Młodkowski, Młotkowski, Mokierski, Molwiłło, Moniwid, Moniwidowicz, Montwid, Montwił, Montwiłło, Montwit, Montywid, Monwid, Monwidowicz, Morstein, Morstin, Morstyn, Morsztyn, Mutykalski, Myszkowicz. N Naguszewski, Nakwaski, Narmont, Narmunt, Nasmont, Natalski, Nazdrowicz, Newelski, Niedoma, Niemiera, Niemierzyc, Niesiołowski, Nieścinko, Nietowć, Nieustępowicz, Niewiardowski, Niezwiecki, Ninieński, Norewicz, Normont, Notowicz, Nozdrowicz, Nutowć, Nutowicz, Nutowiec. O Odyniec, Oklejski, Okuszka, Okuszko, Olchowicz, Olchowiecki, Olechnowicz, Olechowicz, Ososkowicz, Osostowicz, Ostaniewicz, Ostankowicz, Ostaszkiewicz, Ostrowski, Ostrzeszewicz, Ostrzewski. P Pacenko, Pacewicz, Pacyna, Pacynka, Pacynko, Pajewski, Pantalowski, Paruszewski, Parys, Parzenczewski, Parzęczewski, Parzęczowski, Paszkowski, Pausza, Pawłowski, Pawsza, Pereszczak, Pereszczaka, Petkiewicz, Petroch, Petruszewicz, Petyhorski, Piaszczyński, Piechocki, Piechowski, Pieczychowski, Pieniążek, Pietkiewicz, Pietraszko, Pietrusiński, Pigłowski, Pilecki, Piorun, Piotrewicz, Piotrowicz, Piotrowski, Piórkowski, Piórowicz, Pławiński, Pobłocki, Podgorski, Podhajecki, Podlęski, Podłęski, Pogorski, Pokrywnicki, Pokrzywnicki, Połocki, Połoniewicz, Połoński, Popławski, Postawka, Postawko, Preuss, Prusakiewicz, Pruski, Pruszak, Pruszakiewicz, Przegaliński, Przyborowski, Przyłuski, Przywidzki, Pstrocki, Ptaszyński, Pudliszkowski, Putianowicz, Putraszko, Putyanowicz, Puzyno. R Raczkowski, Radwański, Rajcewicz, Rakiewicz, Rakowic, Rakowicki, Rakowicz, Rączkowski, Rekscia, Rekszyński, Rekść, Rekuć, Rentfiński, Rezwic, Rętfiński, Rimsza, Rogowski, Rohoziński, Rojcewicz, Roman, Romaszka, Romaszko, Roycewicz, Rozdzwienicki, Rozmanik, Rykowski, Rymsz, Rymsza, Ryx, Rzadki. S Sachnowski, Sakel, Sakiel, Saltejewicz, Salewski, Samotycki, Samotyk, Sawojski, Scierski, Sczepiecki, Serbin, Sępieński, Sępiński, Siąski, Siciński, Sieczko, Siedleszczeński, Siedleszczyński, Siedliszczański, Siedliszczeński, Sieniawski, Sienkiewicz, Sierpski, Siezieniewski, Sięski, Sikorski, Skinder, Skorupa, Skorupka, Skorupko, Skumin, Sławaniewski, Sławicki, Sławiński, Sławoczyński, Sławoszyński, Słobodziński, Słobotski, Słotwiński, Słowacki, Słowaczyński, Słucki, Słupowski, Smoiski, Smojski, Sojkowski, Songin, Soroka, Soroko, Specymirski, Spicymirski, Spiner, Spławski, Srzechiński, Srzedzieński, Srzedziński, Stalkiewicz, Stancewicz, Stanczewicz, Staniewicz, Stanilewicz, Stanilewski, Stańczyk, Starowolski, Starzechowski, Staszkiewicz, Stawryłło, Stawryło, Stecewicz, Sterpejko, Stiiernski, Stirnski, Stiruski, Strejkowski, Streżowicz, Strubnica, Stryjkowski, Styrnski, Styrpejko, Styruski, Suchorowski, Sudnik, Swołyński, Sworski, Syćko, Syniewski, Szalamuński, Szalkiewicz, Szałkiewicz, Szaniecki, Szawernowski, Szczepicki, Szczepiecki, Szczypiecki, Szeński, Szott, Szpiner, Szredziński, Szuczewski, Szulakiewicz, Szuplewicz, Szwojnicki, Szymkiewicz, Szymkowicz. Ś Ścierski, Śledziewicz, Śniadecki, Śnieżko, Średziński, Śrzedziński, Świniarski, Świrski. T Talmont, Tarło, Tarnau, Tarnow, Tarnowski, Temruk, Tędziagolski, Tędziogolski, Tomkowicz, Tongin, Towgin, Towginowicz, Trojanowski, Trzcieński, Trzciński, Tułkowski, Tulikowski Tyszkiewicz. U Ulęzgęłło, Urak, Urbanowicz, Urbański, Ustarbowski. V Virion. W Wacławski, Wapczyński, Wardeski, Wardęski, Warnsdorf, Warszewicz, Wasilewicz, Wawpszewicz, Wawszewicz, Wedecki, Węcławski, Węsierski, Wiazewicz, Wiaziewicz, Wiażewicz, Wiąz, Wicki, Wiedecki, Wieroszemski, Wierozemski, Wierzbicki, Więcławski, Wilkowski, Wisiecki, Wiszacki, Witcki, Witski, Wodzicki, Wojakowski, Wojanowski, Wojniat, Wojnowski, Woliński, Wolski, Wołkowski, Wołodko, Wołodźko, Woronowicz, Wrzosek, Wyrowski, Wyrozembski, Wyrozemski, Wyrozębski, Wyrozęski, Wyrzykowski, Wyskocki, Wysocki. Z Zaborowski, Zaborski, Zabrzeziński, Zabrzeżański, Zacharewicz, Zacharowicz, Zajączkowski, Zawadzki, Zbirochowski, Zbiroski, Zbirowski, Ziembowski, Zienkowski, Zongołowicz, Zuroch, Zurowski, Zygmuntowicz. Ż Żagliński, Żagowicz, Żarski, Żebrowski, Żłobicki, Żodan, Żongołłowicz, Żuk, Żuławski, Żurawicki, Żurawski, Żurowski, Życzyński, Żyła, Żyłowski, Żyrawski, Żytowski

Leliwa is a Polish coat of arms. It was used by several hundred noble families during the times of the Kingdom of Poland and the Polish–Lithuanian Commonwealth, and remains in use today by many of the descendants of these families. There are several forms of the arms, all of which bear the name, Leliwa, but which may be distinguished as variations of the same arms by the addition of a Roman numeral. In 19th century during a pan South-Slavic Illyrian movement heraldic term Leliwa (Croatian: Leljiva) also entered Croatian heraldry as a name for the coat of arms considered to be the oldest known symbol; Bleu celeste, a mullet of six points Or surmounted above a crescent Argent – A golden six-pointed star (representing the morning star) over a silver crescent moon on a blue shield, but also as a name for all other coats of arms that have a crescent and a mullet.

== Blazon ==
Original coat of arms of Leliwa, otherwise referred to as Leliwa I include Azure Shield (in Polish heraldry, this tincture is always sky blue), a crescent or, surmounted by a mullet of six points of the second, a Polish nobleman's helm, Crest out of a Polish nobleman's coronet, a fan of seven peacock's feathers proper, charged with the elements of the shield. Azure Mantling and or Motto Leliwa, signifying the battle cry, 'to the Liwa', of these proclamatio-arms.

== Notable bearers and others ==
Bearers mostly resided in the regions Kraków, Poznań and Sandomierz of Poland, Wolyn and Podolia of Ukraine.

Families: Tarnowski family, Sieniawski family, Roycewicz family, Morsztyn family, Hlebowicz family, Czapski family, Tyszkiewicz family, Średziński families (Śrzedziński, Srzedziński, Sredziński), Sudnik family of Sudniki in the former Vilnius poviat (modern day Belarus).

Notable bearers of this coat of arms include: Henryk Leliwa-Roycewicz, Krzysztof Monwid Dorohstajski, Rafał Jarosławski, Jan Andrzej Morsztyn, Adam Sieniawski, Adam Mikołaj Sieniawski, Mikołaj Sieniawski, Mikołaj Hieronim Sieniawski, Konstanty Słotwinski, Jędrzej Śniadecki, Jan Tarnowski, Jan z Tarnowa, Ludwik Tyszkiewicz, Ludwik Skumin Tyszkiewicz, Jan Janowicz Zabrzeziński, Jan Jurejewicz Zabrzeziński, Juliusz Słowacki, Witold Pilecki, Andrzej Bobola, Józef Czapski, Karol Hutten-Czapski, Emeryk Hutten-Czapski, Agenor Romuald Gołuchowski, Spytek I Jarosławski, Jan Chrucki, Henryk Dobrzański, Kazimierz Antoni Wodzicki, Michael Bisping

There are also: Lipka Tatar families of Aksan, Aksanow, Adamowicz, Abramowicz, Musicz, Illasiewicz and Smolski. Zaporozhian Cossack families of Hłasko (Hlaska). Hungarian families of Hontpazmany or conte Panzano, Urak and Czobor. Circassian families of Szymkowicz and Temruk. French families of de Virion and de Spiner. German, Prussian families of Morstyn, Beyer, Brandt, Bolte, Przywidzki, Damerau, Kappel, Lipen. Flemish family of Bremer and Dutch/Netherlands families of De Kunder/Kunter/Kunther. Moldavian family Brăescu.

== Gallery ==
Drawings of Leliwa during the ages

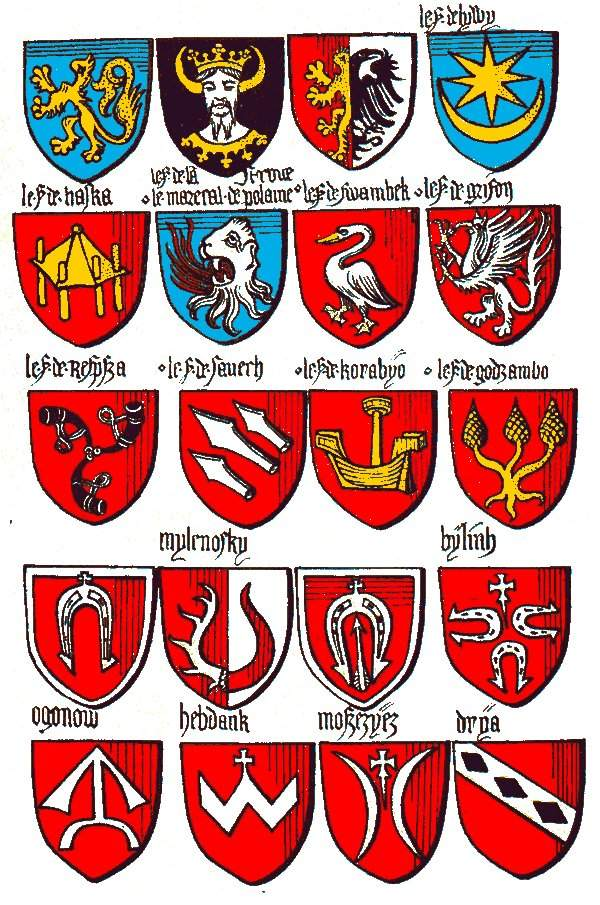
In Toison d'Or from c. 1433–1435 (in the upper right corner)

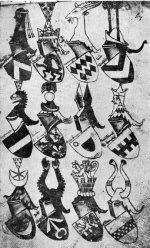
In Armorial Bellenvillle from 1360 to 1400 (in the lower left corner)

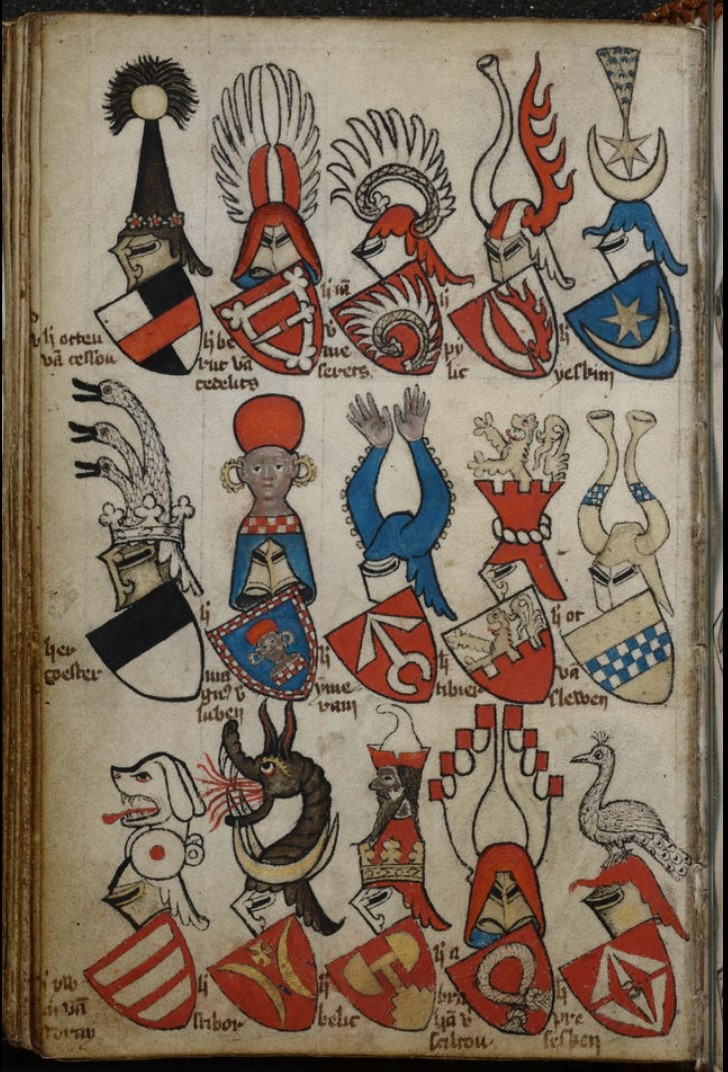
Leliwa in the 15th century shape in Armorial Gelre (in the upper right corner)

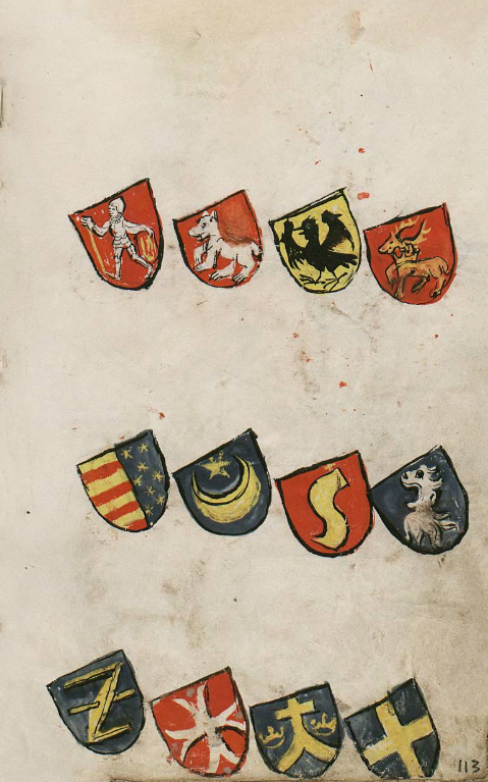
In Codex Bergshammar from the 15th century (second row, second column)

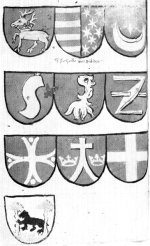
In Armorial Lyncenich from the 15th century (in the upper right corner)

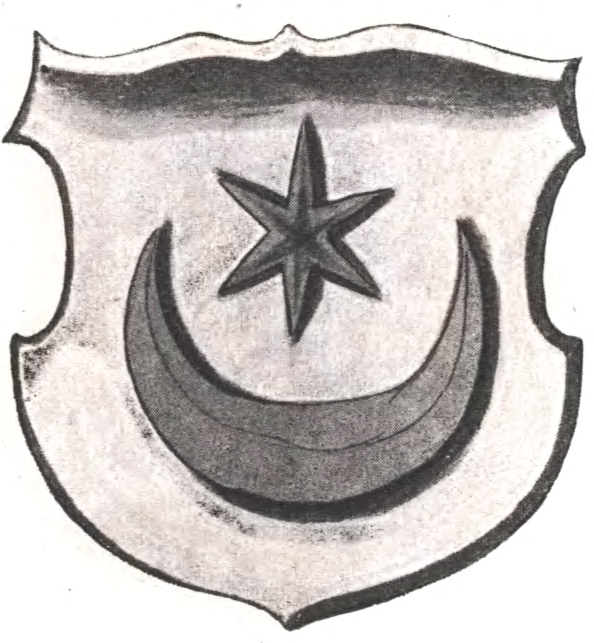
Leliwa in a sixteenth-century copy of Stemmata Polonica by Długosz

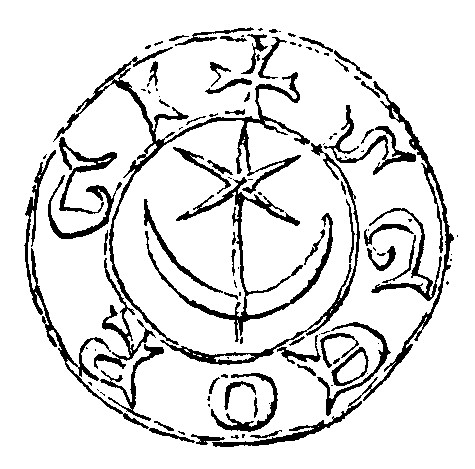
Seal with the Leliwa arms of an unknown Jerzy from the beginning of the 14th century

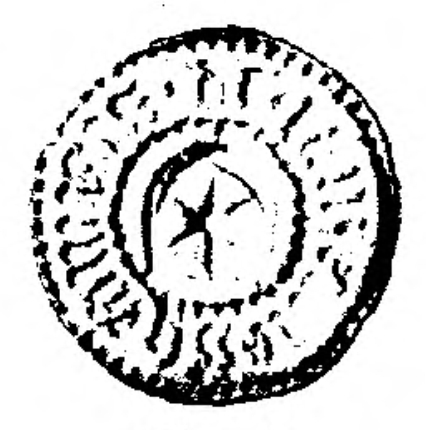
Seal with the Leliwa arms of Jadwiga z Leżenic from the act of the Union of Horodlo in 1413

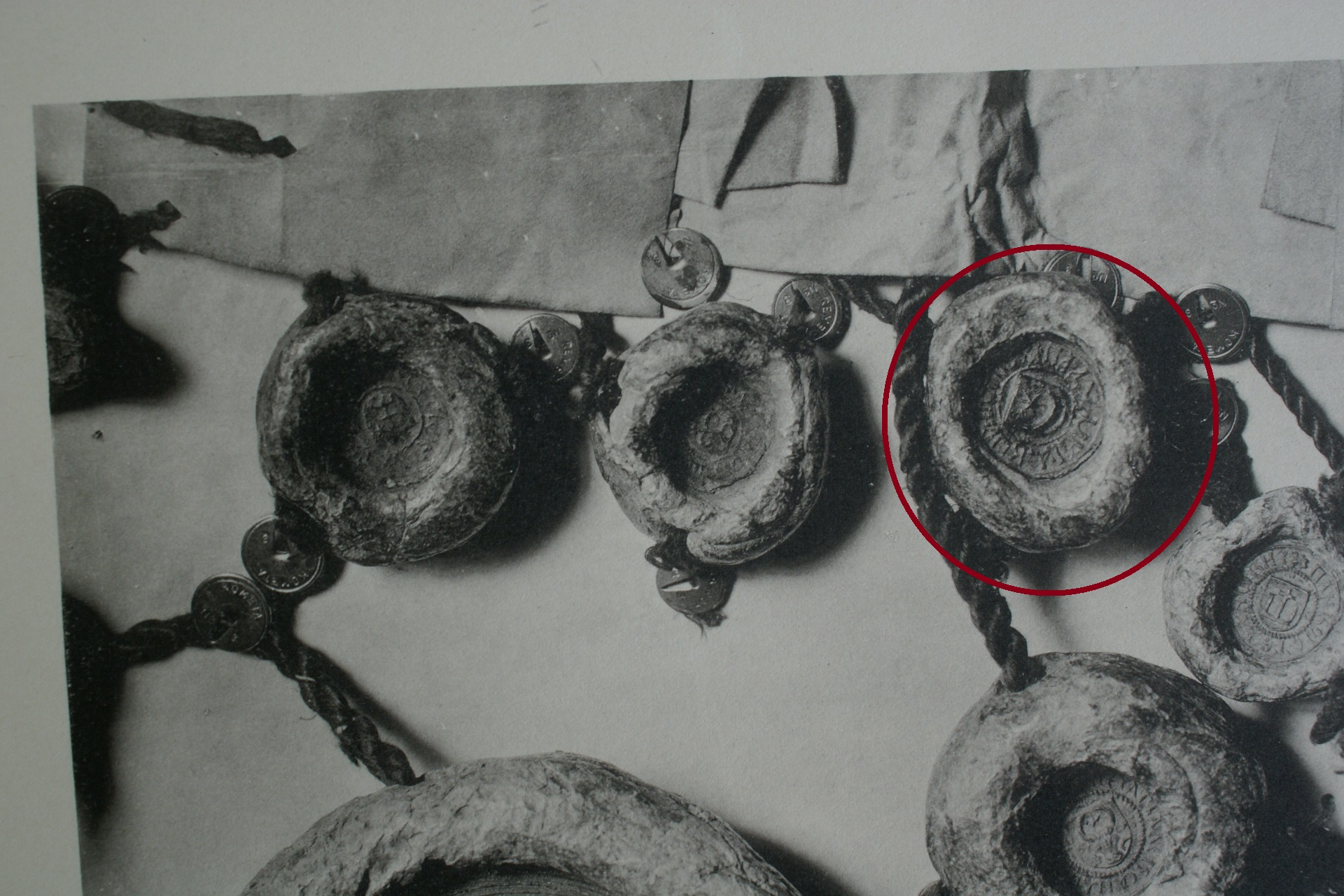
Leliwa on the seal of Moldavian Boyar Duma Brăescu on a document from 1445

Leliwa in the medieval shape – modern reconstruction

Leliwa in the 15th century shape – modern reconstruction

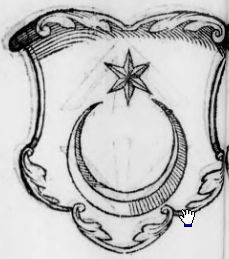
Leliwa in the armorial of Ambroży z Nysy, c. 1572

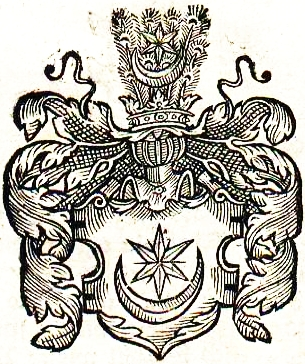
Leliwa in Gniazdo cnoty... by Bartłomiej Paprocki, 1578

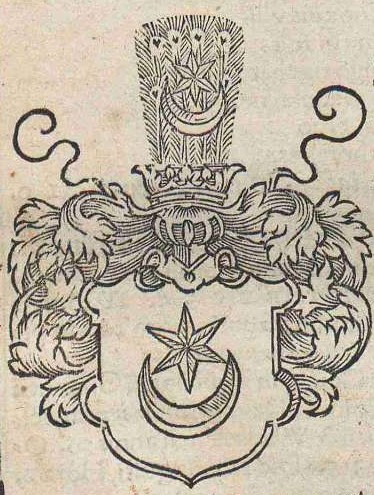
Leliwa in the armorial Herby rycerztwa polskiego... by Bartłomiej Paprocki, 1584

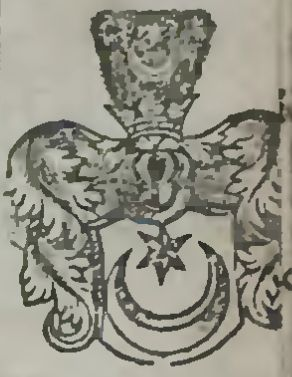
Leliwa in Kronice polskiej by Marcin Bielski, 1597

Leliwa in Kleynotach.. by Jan Aleksander Gorczyn, 1630

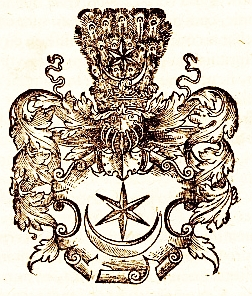
Leliwa in the armorial of Okolski, 1641

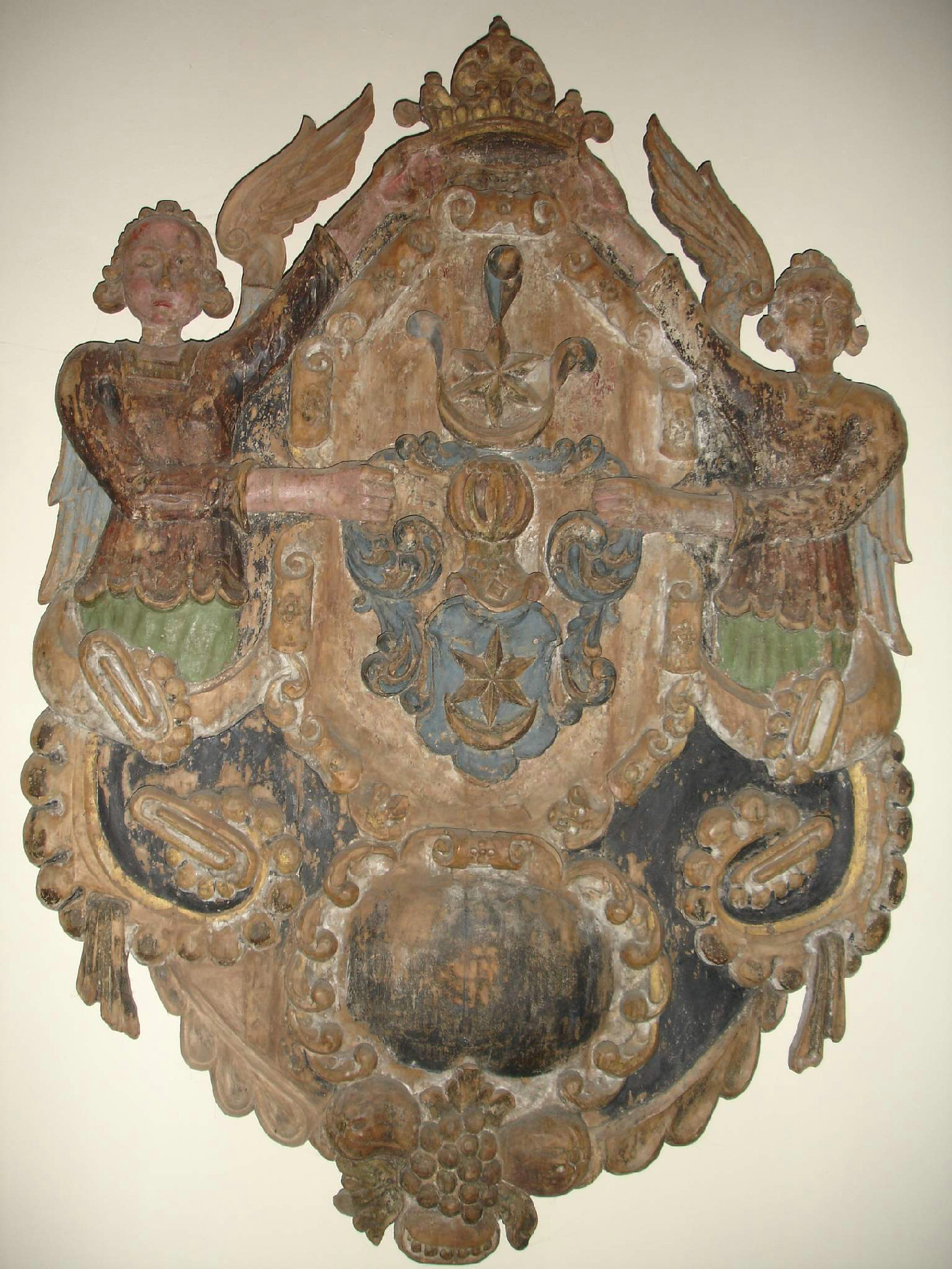
Leliwa on a cartouche in the Castle of Bielsko-Biala of the princes Sułkowski, 17th century

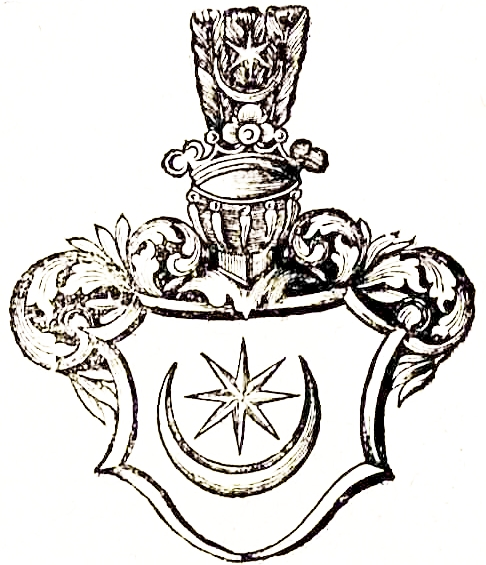
Leliwa in the armorial of Niesiecki, 1740

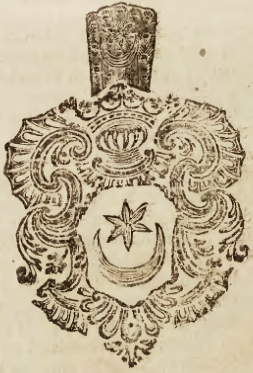
Leliwa in Herbarzu wielu domow Korony Polskiey St. Duńczewskiego, 1757

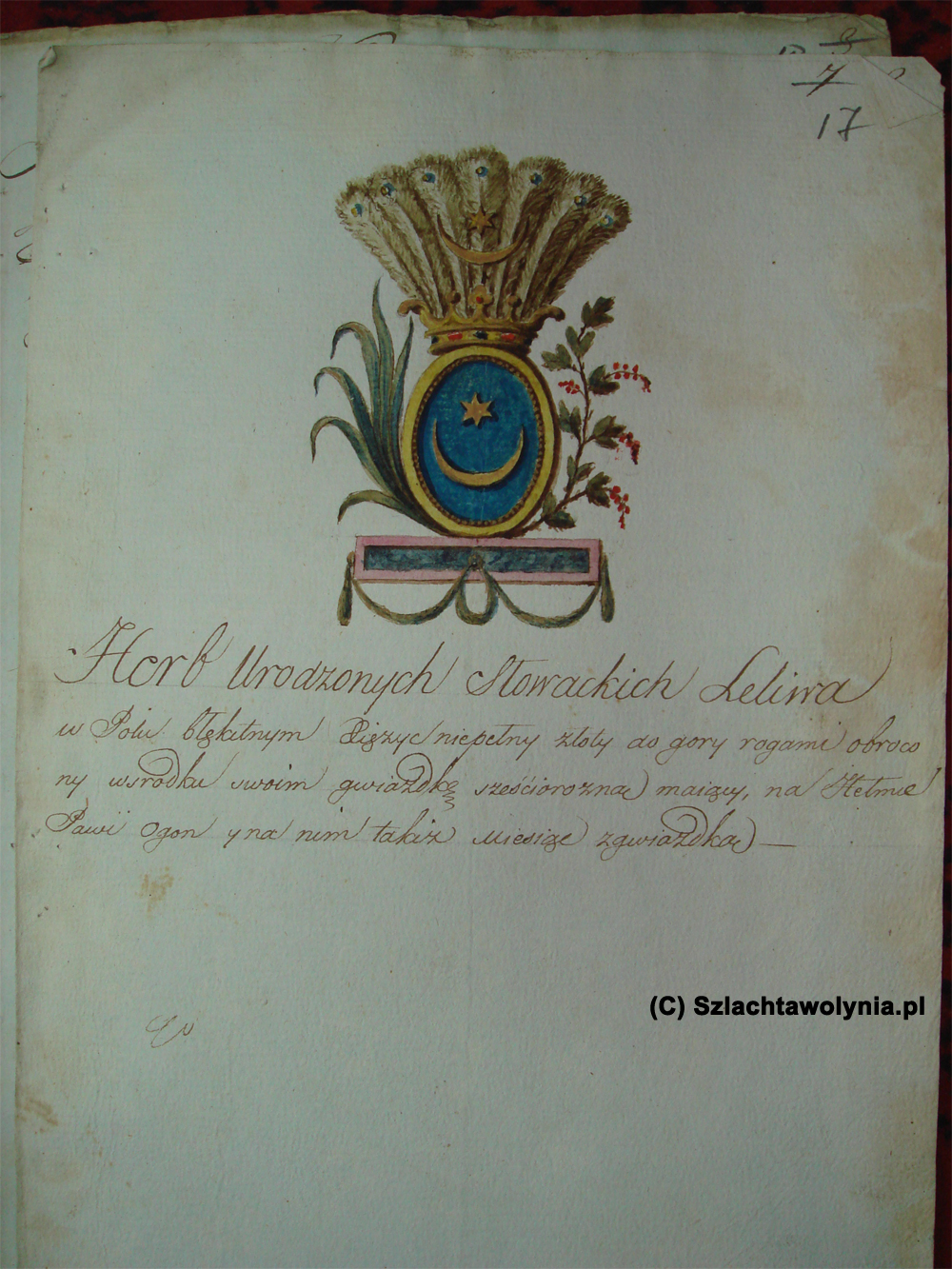
Leliwa in a legitimacy document of the Słowacki family, 1803

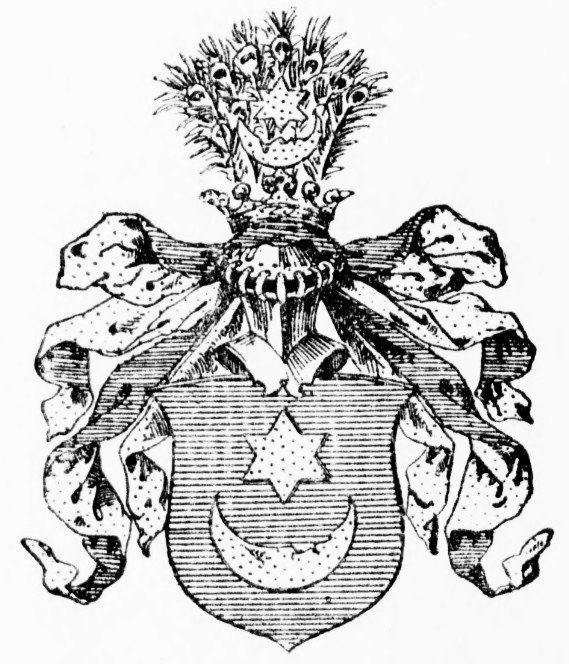
Leliwa in the armorial of Ostrowski, 1897

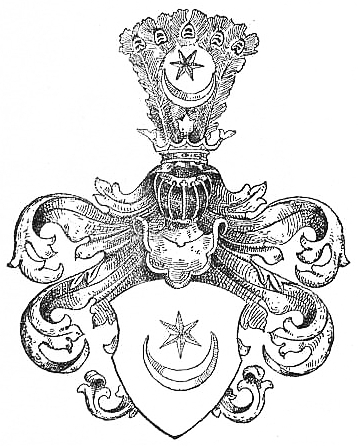
Leliwa in the armorial of Wijuk Kojałowicz, reprinted in 1905

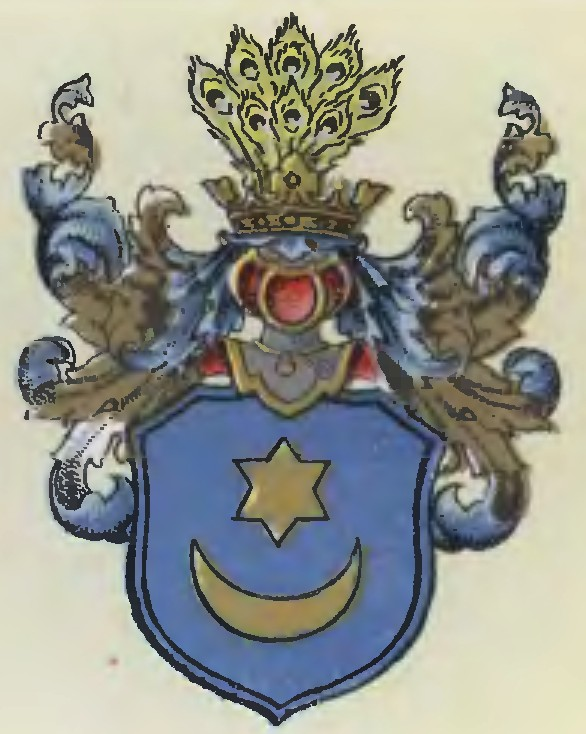
Leliwa in the armorial of „Herby szlachty polskiej” by Z. Leszczyca, 1908

Paintings

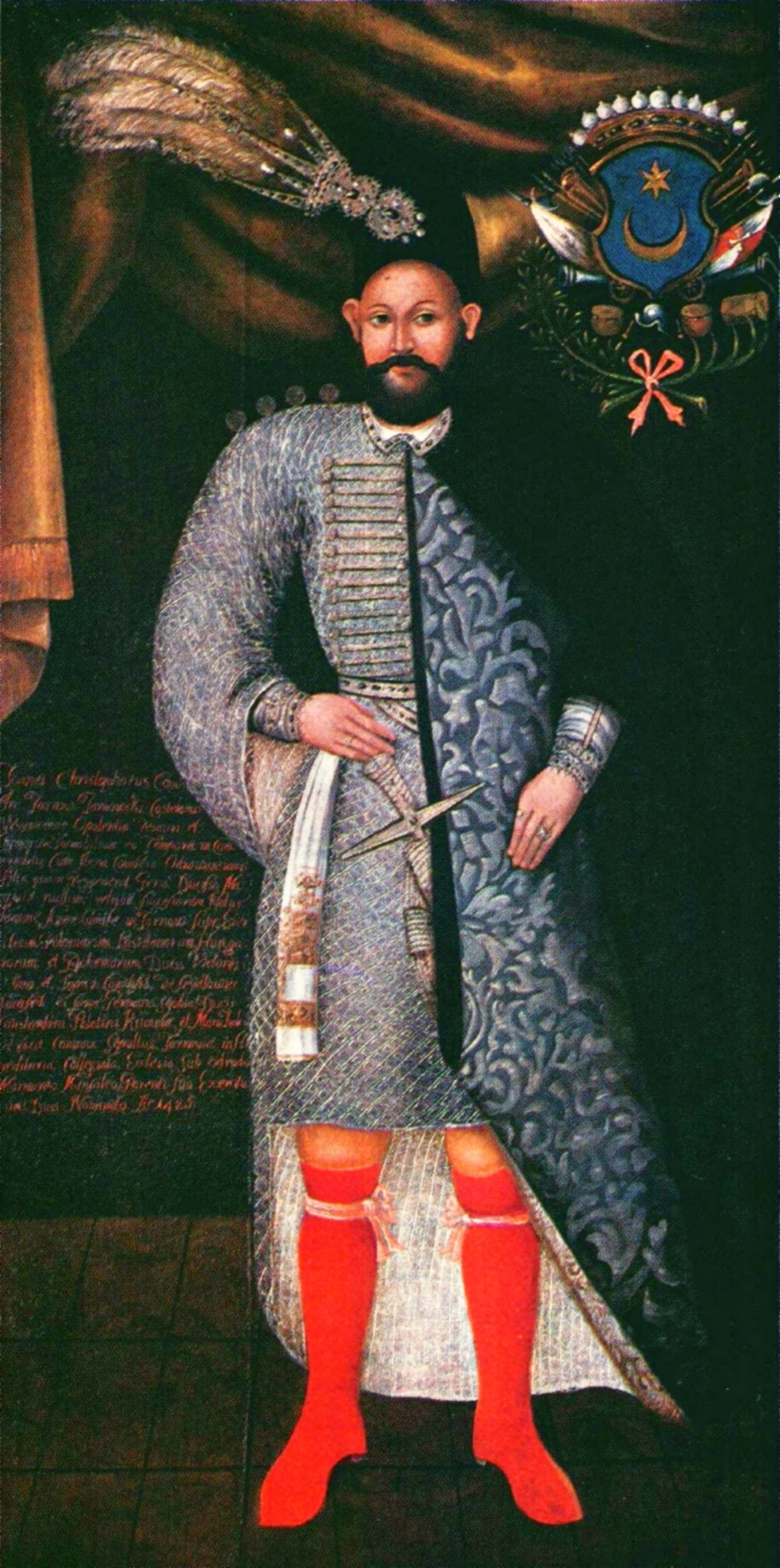
Leliwa on the painting of Jan Krzysztof Tarnowski, 16th century

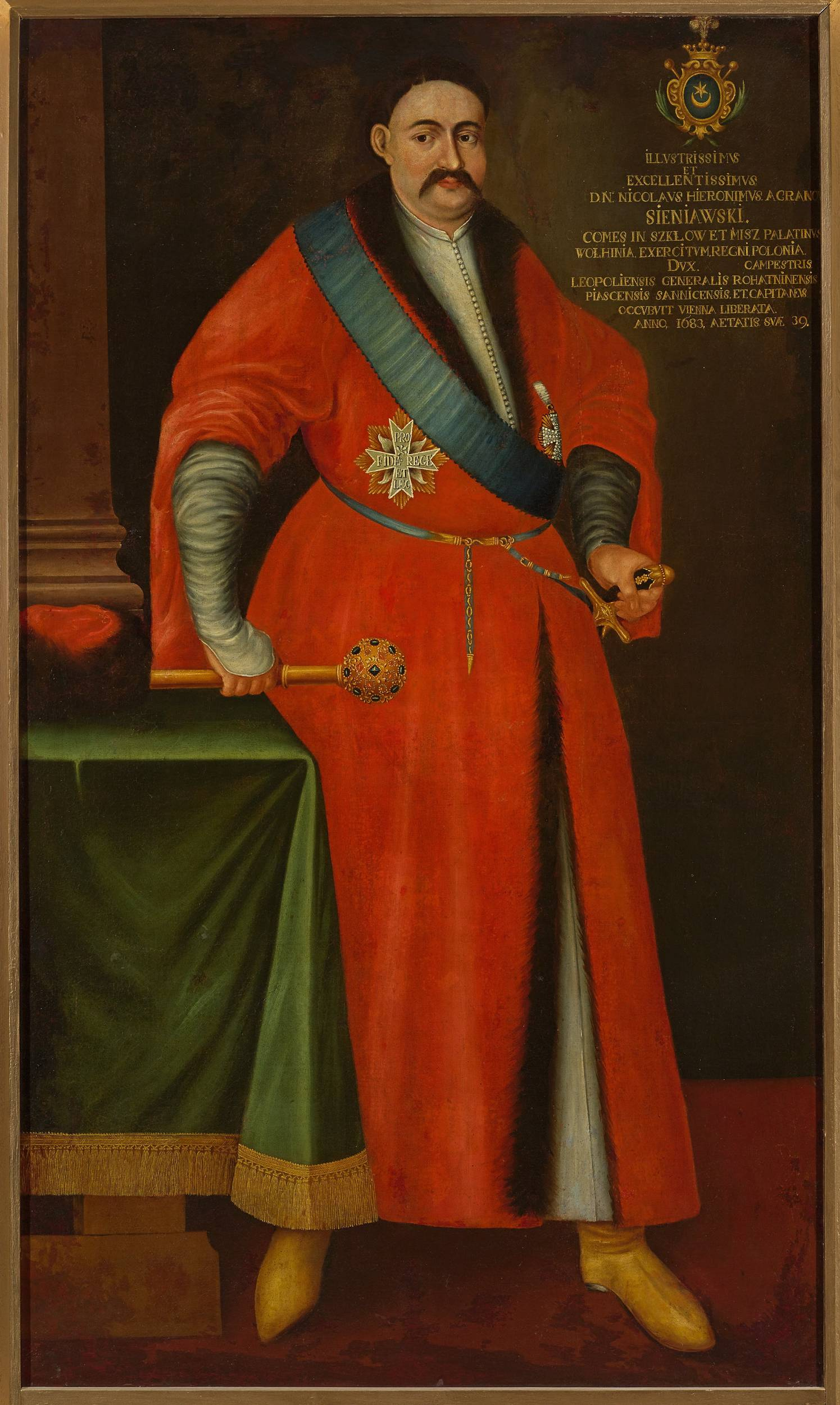
Leliwa on the painting of Mikołaj Hieronim Sieniawski, 17th century

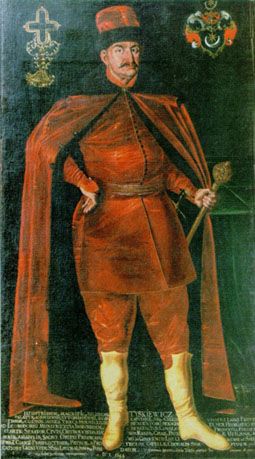
Leliwa on the painting of Janusz Tyszkiewicz Łohojski, 17th century

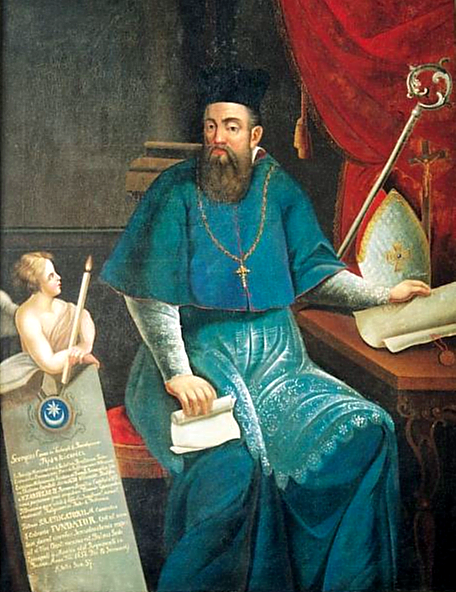
Leliwa on the painting of Jerzy Tyszkiewicz, 17th century

Standard variations

Pietrasiewicz

Pilecki (in Prussia)

Piotrowicz (in Samogitia), it could be also a variation of Murdelio

Piotrowicz II

Policzyński

Poliwczyński (in Prussia)

Przywidzki

Coat of arms of Prokop Sieniawski, a combination with the coat of arms Chodkiewicz of his wife

Trzcieński vel Trzciński

Wietecki

Witecki – according to Niesiecki

Wojanowski

Coat of arms of Szczęsny Wojanowski, containing symbols of a Commander of the Malta Knights

Zienkowicz

Standard variations from ennoblements

Bajer – variation granted to Andrzej Bajer in 1678

Erbs – variation granted to Andrzej Grochowski in 1753

Juźwikiewicz – variation granted to Juźwikiewicz brothers in 1777

Lesieniewicz – variation from an ennoblement in 1739, mentioned in Małorossijskim Gierbovniku.

Ryks – variation from a confirmation of nobility of the Ryks (Ryx) family (from Land of Warsaw) in Prussia in 1804

Wodzicki – variation from an ennoblement in 1676, used also by Borsztyn family

Standard variations (considered as Leliwa variations only by single heraldists)

Adamowicz (Tatar family)

Kiwalski

Macewicz (from Lithuania)

Variety of Macewicz from an ennoblement in 1764–65 or 1781

Mąkierski vel Makierski vel Mokierski, mentioned by Wittyg

Pawłowski (from the Czech part of Silesia, formerly from Land of Poznań

Pawłowski de Rosenfeld a German family, branch of the Pawłowski family which used the "Pawłowski III" coat of arms

Pawsza

Coat of arms of Pierścień granted to Franciszek Ryx in 1768

Coat of arms of Franciszek Ryx (1790)

Staszkiewicz II – variation used by the Staszkiewicz family from Samogitia, mentioned by Niesiecki

Żarowski – from an ennoblement in 1576, according to Konarski a variation of Leliwa

Aristocratic variations

Coat of arms of Princess Ostrogski and Zasławski, used according to Tadeusz Gajl also by Kłosewicz, Neronowicz, Szpila, Szpilewski and Szpilowski families.

The basic count version of the Leliwa used by Czapski and Morsztyn families

Coat of arms of Count Gołuchowski, with the coat of arms of the Russian Empire

Coat of arms of Hutten-Czapski, a combination of Leliwa and the German coat of arms of the Hutten family

Baron variation of the Pawłowski family (mentioned only by Juliusz Karol Ostrowski)

Coat of arms of Count Tarnowski

Coat of arms of Count Tyszkiewicz

Coat of arms of Count Wodzicki

Families from Kashubia

Czarnicki

Dułak

Fargo

Gliszczyński

Lisewski

Mach

Mach – variation of the previous

Mach – variation of the previous

Małszycki

Ossowski

Piechowski

Piotroch and Poklat

Repko

Spęgawski (II)

Żychcki

In Croatian and Illyrian heraldry

So-called oldest Croatian coat of arms

coat of arms of the Republic of Croatia, first shield from the left

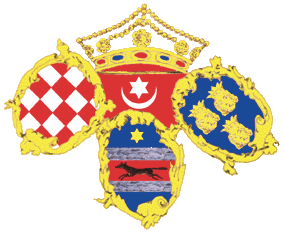
Banal standard 1848.

first (?) coat of arms of Croatia

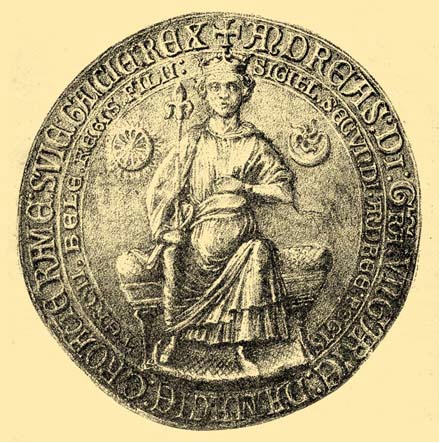
Seal of king Andrije II., Duke of Croatia and Dalmatia (1197–1204)

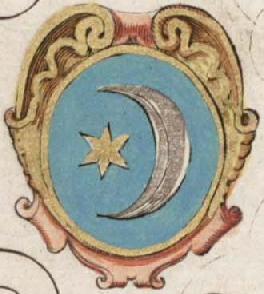
Coat of arms of imaginary Great Illyria

Coat of arms of Zagreb

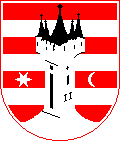
Coat of arms of Varaždin

Coat of arms of Illyria from Fojnica Armorial

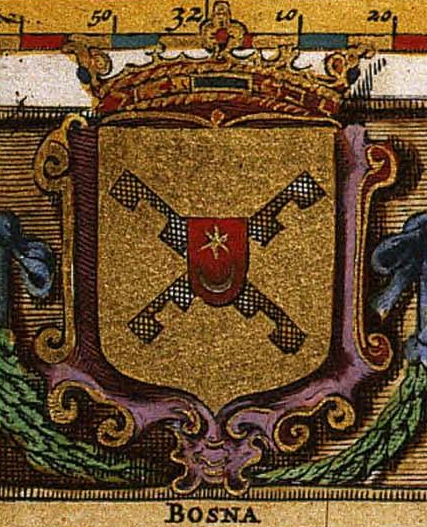
Coat of arms of Bosnia from a map of Joan Blaeu (1668.) ordered by Ban of Croatia Petar Zrinski

Coat of arms of Grb Bosne from Fojnica Armorial

== See also ==
- Polish heraldry
- Heraldic family
- List of Polish nobility coats of arms

== Bibliography ==
- Bartosz Paprocki: Herby rycerstwa polskiego na pięcioro ksiąg rozdzielone, Kraków, 1584.
- Tadeusz Gajl: Herbarz polski od średniowiecza do XX wieku : ponad 4500 herbów szlacheckich 37 tysięcy nazwisk 55 tysięcy rodów. L&L, 2007. ISBN 978-83-60597-10-1.
- Alfred Znamierowski: Herbarz rodowy. Warszawa: Świat Książki, 2004. ISBN 83-7391-166-9.
- Jan Długosz: Liber Beneficiorum. T. I, II.
- Włodzimierz Dworzaczek: Leliwici Tarnowscy. Instytut Wydawniczy PAX, 1971. ISBN 8390150468.
- Sławomir Górzyński: Herby szlachty polskiej. Warszawa: Wydawnictwa Uniwersytetu Warszawskiego i Wydawnictwo ALFA, 1990. ISBN 83-230-0349-1.
- Szymon Okolski: Orbis Poloni.. T. 2. Kraków: 1641–1643.
- Juliusz Karol Ostrowski: Księga herbowa rodów polskich. T. 1–2. Warszawa: Główny skład księgarnia antykwarska B. Bolcewicza, 1897.
- Franciszek Piekosiński: Heraldyka polska wieków średnich. Kraków: Akademia Umiejętności, 1899.
- Hipolit Stupnicki: Herbarz polski Kaspra Niesieckiego. T. 6. Lipsk: Breitkopf i Haertl, 1841.
- Alfred Znamierowski: Herbarz rodowy. Warszawa: Świat Książki, 2004. ISBN 83-7391-166-9.
- Oleg Odnorozhenko, Rodova heral''dyka Ruso-Vlaxiyi (Moldav''skoho hospodarstva) kincya XIV-XVI st., Harkiv, 2008, p. 65.
- Album paléographique moldave. Documents du XIV^{e}, XV^{e} et XVI^{e} siècle. Recueillis par Jean Bogdan et publiés avec une instruction et des résumés par N. Iorga. Album paleografic moldovenesc. Documente din secolele al XIV-lea, al XV-lea şi al XVI-lea. Adunate de Ioan Bogdan şi publicate cu o introducere şi resumate de N. Iorga, Bucarest/București – Paris, 1926, planşa 98 (imagini în anexă).
