= Babiński =

Babiński coat of arms

Babiński (feminine: Babińska; plural: Babińscy) is a Polish surname. It may be transliterated as: Babinski, Babinska, Babinsky. Notable people with the surname include:

- Charles Babinski
- Dre Babinski (born 1985), American singer, songwriter, violinist, and guitarist
- Henri Babinski (1855–1931), French gastronome and food writer
- Joseph Babinski (1857–1932), French-Polish professor of neurology
- Kazimierz Bąbiński (1895–1970), 27th Volhynian Infantry Division commander
- Stefan Babinsky (born 1996), Austrian alpine skier
- Wacław Babiński (1887–1957), Polish diplomat and professor at the University of Montreal
- Zbigniew Babiński (1896–1940), Polish military and sports aviator

== Places ==
- Babinska Reka, Kyustendil Province, Bulgaria
- Bolshoy Babinsky, Volgograd Oblast, Russia

== See also ==
- Babinski reflex
- Anton–Babinski syndrome
- Babinski–Nageotte syndrome
- Babinski-Fröhlich syndrome
