= Nageotte =

Nageotte (/nəˈʒɒt/) is a French surname related to the places named Nageot. It may refer to the following notable people:

- Aleth Guzman-Nageotte (1904–1978), French sculptor and medalist
- Clint Nageotte (born 1980), American baseball pitcher
- Jean Nageotte (1866–1948), French neuroanatomist known for the Babinski–Nageotte syndrome
- Katie Nageotte (born 1991), American pole vaulter
