= Wodzicki =

Wodzicki (feminine: Wodzicka) is a Polish surname. Notable people with the surname include:

- Antoni Jontek Wodzicki (1934–1999), New Zealand geologist - Mount Wodzicki is named after him
- Kazimierz Wodzicki (1816–1889), Galician ornithologist and nobleman
- Kazimierz Antoni von Granöw Wodzicki (1900–1987), Polish-born New Zealand ornithologist
- Maria Wodzicka (1901–1968), New Zealand community activist
- Mariusz Wodzicki (born 1956), mathematician
