= Konopiński =

Konopiński (feminine: Konopińska) is a Polish surname. It may be variously transliterated as: Konopinski, Konopinsky. Some of them use Leliwa coat of arms. Notable people with the surname include:

- Anna Kociarz-Konopińska (born 1974), Polish actress
- Emil Konopinski (1911–1990), American nuclear scientist of Polish descent
- Joanna Konopińska (1925–1996), Polish writer
- Jules Konopinski (1930–2023), German-born British anti-fascist activist
- Lech Konopiński (1931–2023), Polish poet and writer
- Marian Konopiński (1907–1943), Polish Catholic priest, Capuchin friar, blessed of the Catholic Church, Oflag X-B prisoner, one of 108 Martyrs of World War II
- Michał Konopiński (1855–1928), Polish journalist and publicist
- Tadeusz Konopiński (1894–1965), Polish veterinarian
- Tomasz Konopiński (born 1965), Polish poet
