= Sonofabitch stew =

American stew

Son-of-a-bitch stew
- Type: Stew
- Place of origin: United States
- Region or state: Western United States
- Main ingredients: Beef, offal, marrow gut

Sonofabitch stew (or sonofagun stew. Also spelled son-of-a-bitch.) was a cowboy dish of the American West.

== Recipes ==
Various recipes exist for this beef stew, and some sources say its ingredients may vary according to whatever is on hand. Most recipes involve meat and offal from a calf, though, making sonofabitch stew something of a luxury item on the trail. Alan Davidson's 1999 book Oxford Companion to Food specifies meats and organs from a freshly killed unweaned calf, including the brain, heart, liver, sweetbreads, tongue, pieces of tenderloin, and an item called the "marrow gut" and much Louisiana hot sauce.

This last item, the "marrow gut", was a key ingredient. Davidson quotes Ramon Adam's 1952 Come An' Get It: The Story of the Old Cowboy Cook, which reports that this is a tube, between two of the calf's stomachs, filled with a substance resembling marrow, deemed edible only while the calf is young and still feeding on milk. This marrow-like substance was included in the stew and, according to Adams, was "what gave the stew such a delicious flavor". Davidson says this "marrow gut" probably was the passage leading to the abomasum as well as the abomasum itself (said to have a "distinctive flavour of rennin-curdled milk"). Another possibility is that "marrow gut" refers to the calf's thymus, more commonly known as "sweetbread". Sweetbread is indeed commonly found in traditional European cookery and many books refer to the use of this ingredient, including for the preparation of stews made with offal. In German it is called "Kalbsbries", in French "Ris de veau". A French book originally published in 1928 (Ali-Bab, an alias used by Henri Babinski: Gastronomie Pratique) refers to a recipe involving sweetbread but also the spinal marrow ("cord"). Babinski is known for having traveled around the world.

The stew also contained seasonings and sometimes onion. Babinski's recipe for eight guests contains the following ingredients, which cook together for about four hours at moderate heat in the oven, the excess of surfacing fat being removed before serving:

- 2 pounds (907 g) of flesh of a calf's head (including the ears, cut into slices)
- 1 pound (454 g) of liver, sliced (placed on top of the mix)
- 1 pound of spinal marrow cut into pieces (idem)
- 2 kidneys, sliced (idem)
- 1 sweetbread, sliced (idem)
- tongue (skin removed) and brains, all sliced (idem)
- dry white wine (1/4 liter)
- a strong veal broth (1/4 liter)
- carrots, onions, tomatoes and a few green olives without stones
- butter (to roast the sliced liver and kidneys before adding them to the mix)
- some flour to thicken the sauce
- lemon juice at the end, before serving
- salt, pepper, spices

Frank X. Tolbert's 1962 history of chili con carne, A Bowl of Red, discusses sonofabitch stew as well. Tolbert suggests that the chuck wagon cooks borrowed the idea for the stew from the cooking of the Plains Indians. He also specifies a recipe that never includes onions, tomatoes, or potatoes.

== Alternative names ==
In addition to "sonofabitch stew", the dish was known as "rascal stew" or "SOB stew", or fitted with the name of any unpopular figure at the time: for example, "Cleveland stew" in honor of Grover Cleveland, a president in disfavor with the cowboys displaced from the Cherokee Strip. "In the presence of ladies", reports a 1942 Gourmet magazine piece, the dish was commonly called "son-of-a-gun stew" instead. The "polite" name is used in the Gunsmoke episode "Long, Long Trail" in 1961 (7.6), also Gunsmoke Matt's Love Story in 1973 (19.3) and Disney's 1975 movie adaptation of The Apple Dumpling Gang. In the TV series Yellowstone, the character 'Teeter' cooks the stew for her co-workers, referring to it as "Sum' bitch" (4.4).

== See also ==
- List of stews
