= Jules Froment =

French neurologist (1878–1946)

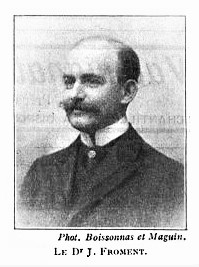
Jules Froment

Jules Froment (Lyon, 1878 – 1946) was a French neurologist. He earned his doctorate in 1906 with a thesis on heart diseases associated with thyrotoxicosis. For much of his career, he was a professor at Lyon.

== Life ==
Froment is remembered for his work with neurological diseases. During World War I, he was stationed at Rennes, where he treated soldiers with nervous disorders. After the war, he co-wrote an important work with Joseph Babiński (1857–1932) concerning the etiology of phenomena such as "shell shock" and "combat hysteria." The study was titled Hystérie, pithiatisme et troubles nerveux d'ordre réflexe en neurologie de guerre, and was considered controversial at the time.

Also with Babiński, Froment is credited with describing a disease characterized by a combination of vasomotor disorders, muscular atrophy and tissue damage. It is now known as Babinski-Froment syndrome.

Froment is credited with devising a series of tests for nerve dysfunction, including a simple way to test ulnar nerve weakness in the hand (known as Froment's sign): if a patient holds a sheet of paper between thumb and index finger and the thumb flexes, this indicates ulnar nerve palsy. This test is used to assess the condition of the adductor pollicis muscle.

== Written works ==
- La préhension dans les paralysies du nerf cubital et le signe du pouce; La presse médicale, Paris, 1915, 23: 409.
- Heredodegenerations retinienne et spino-cerebeleuse; variantes ophtalmoscopiques et neurologique présentés par trois generations successive Journal de médecine de Lyon, 1937: 153–163.
- Troubles nerveux d’ordre reflexe. In their: Hysterie, pithiatisme et troubles nerveux d’ordre reflexe. J. Babinski, J. Froment: Paris, Masson, 1917.

== See also ==
- Froment's sign
