= Froment sign =

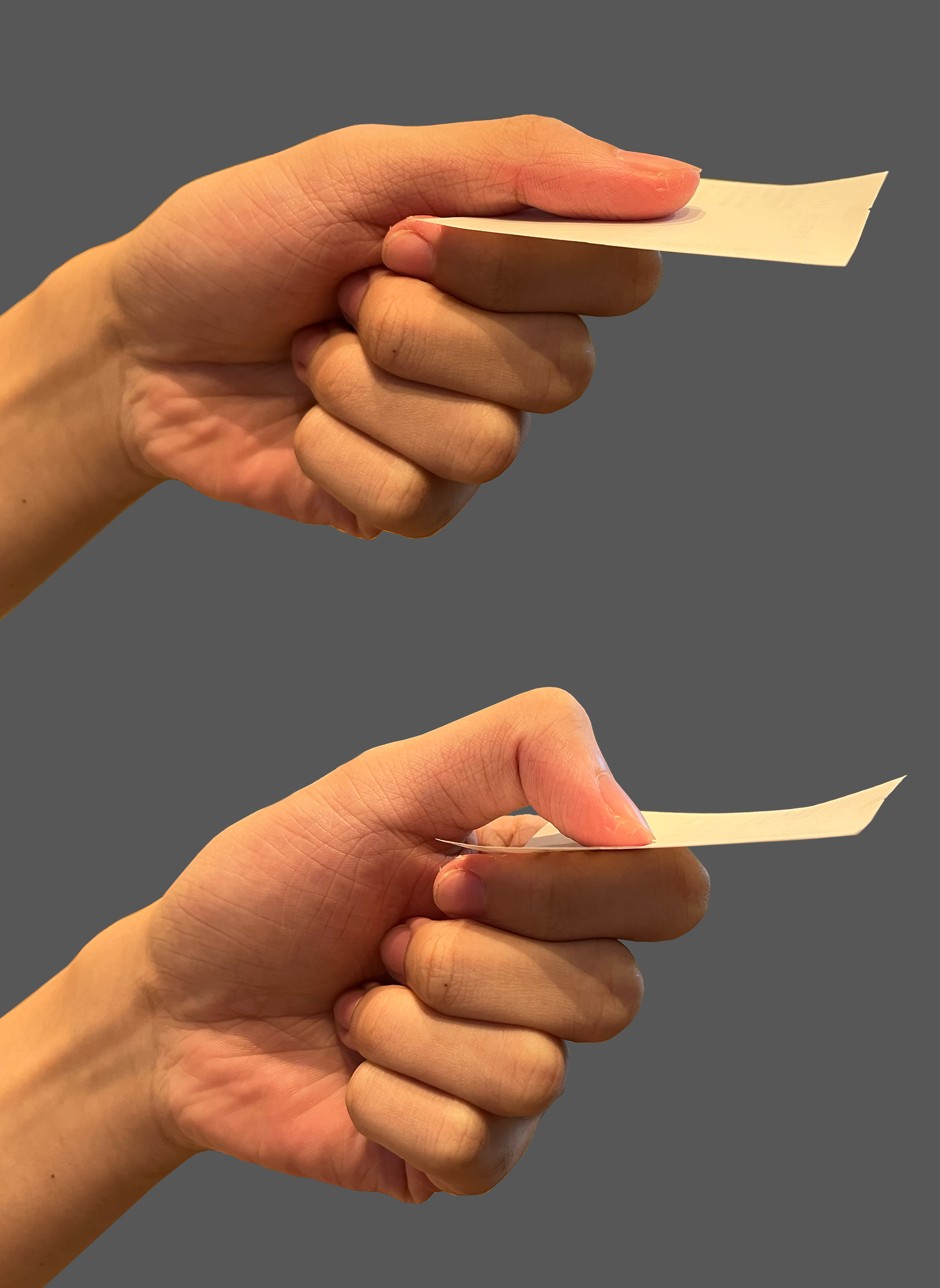
- Positive Froment sign (below)
- Differential diagnosis: palsy of the ulnar nerve

Froment sign is a special test of the hand for weakness of the ulnar nerve, specifically, the action of adductor pollicis.

== Process of examination ==
A patient is asked to pinch an object, usually a flat object such as a piece of paper, between the thumb and index finger (pinch grip). The examiner then attempts to pull the object out of the subject's hand.

- A person with notable weakness of the adductor pollicis due to advanced ulnar neuropathy will flex the thumb using the flexor pollicis longus.
- Froment sign is the flexion of the interphalangeal joint of the thumb rather than adduction of the entire thumb.
- The flexor pollicis longus is nearly always innervated by the anterior interosseous branch of the median nerve.
- Simultaneous hyperextension of the thumb MCP joint is indicative of ulnar nerve compromise. This is also known as Jeanne's sign.

== Eponym ==
It is named after French neurologist Jules Froment.
