= Alfred Fröhlich =

Austrian-American pharmacologist and neurologist

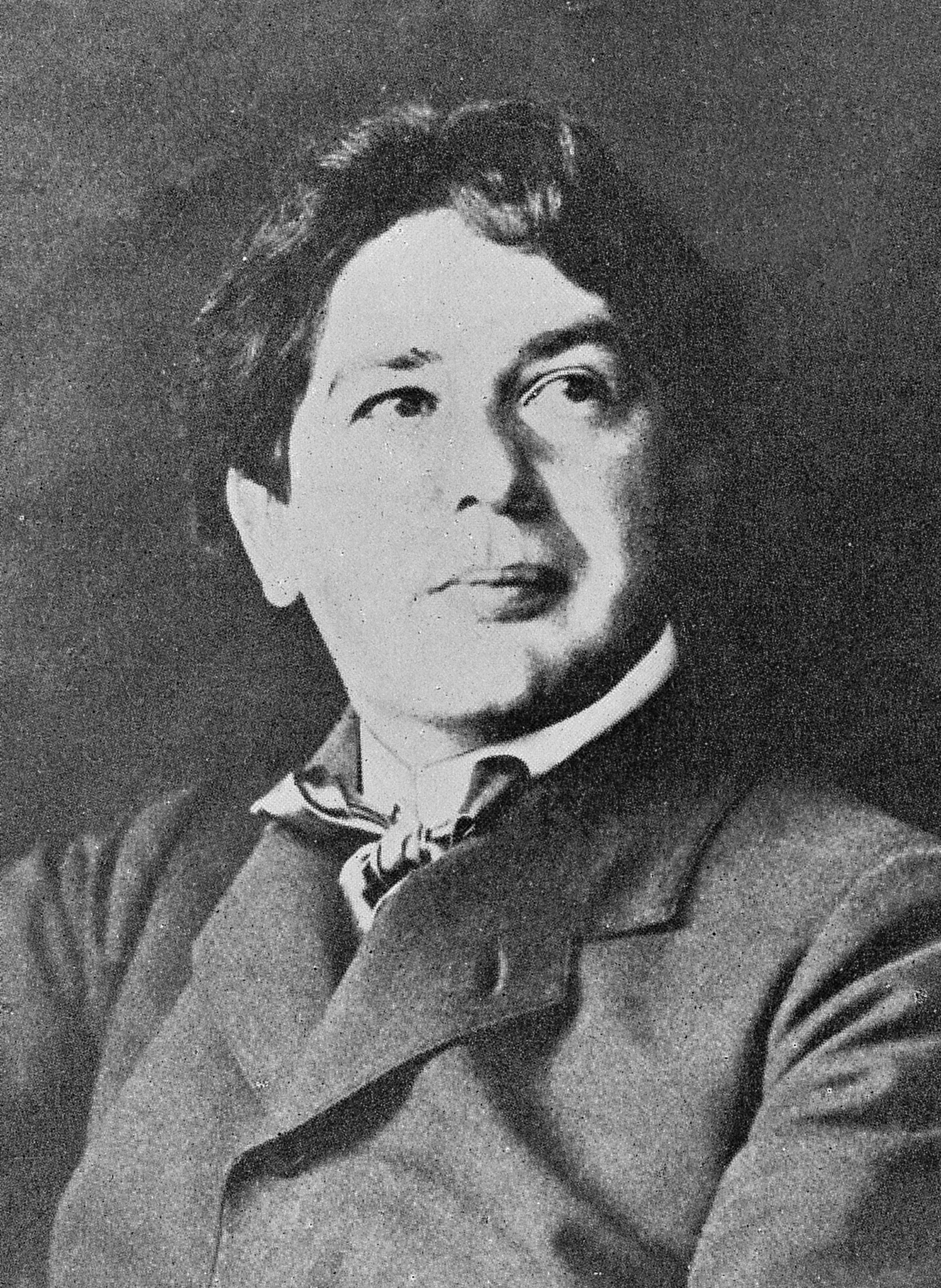
Alfred Frohlich

Alfred Fröhlich (August 15, 1871 – March 22, 1953) was an Austrian-American pharmacologist and neurologist born in Vienna.

== Biography ==
Fröhlich was born in Vienna, into a Jewish family. In 1895 he graduated from the University of Vienna, afterwards remaining at Vienna as an assistant to Carl Nothnagel (1841–1905). In 1905 he became a member of the department of pharmacology at the university, and from 1919 until 1939 he was a full professor of pharmacology and toxicology. Following the Nazi takeover of Austria, Fröhlich emigrated to the United States, where he worked at the May Institute of Medical Research of the Jewish Hospital of Cincinnati. Here he continued his experimental research of the central nervous system.

He is remembered for his studies on the effects of the pituitary on the autonomic nervous system. With Otto Loewi (1873–1961), he performed pharmacological research on cocaine. He was a good friend of Harvey Cushing, whom he met in 1901 while working with Charles Scott Sherrington in Liverpool. In addition to his own laboratory, he also worked in marine laboratories at Naples, Helgoland and in Woods Hole, Massachusetts during his career.

Fröhlich died in 1953 in Cincinnati.

== Fröhlich's syndrome ==
In 1901 he provided a comprehensive description of dystrophia adiposogenitalis, of which he published a paper titled Ein Fall von Tumor der Hypophysis cerebri ohne Akromegalie. This disorder is characterized by feminine obesity along with retarded sexual maturity, and is caused by tumors of the pituitary. In honor of his discovery, this condition was to become known as "Fröhlich's syndrome". It is sometimes referred to as Babinski-Fröhlich syndrome, named in conjunction with Joseph Babinski, who gave an independent description of the disease a year earlier in 1900.

== Selected publications ==
- Ein Fall von Tumor der Hypophysis cerebri ohne Akromegalie (A case involving a tumor of the hypophysis cerebri without acromegaly), In: Wiener klinische Rundschau, 1901, 15: 833–836; 906–908.
- Pharmakologie des Centralnervensystems (Pharmacology of the central nervous system). In: Handbuch der normalen und pathologischen Physiologie. Volume 10, Wien, 1927.
- Pharmakologie des vegetativen (autonomen) Nervensystems (Pharmacology of the autonomic nervous system), In: Handbuch der normalen und pathologischen Physiologie. Volume 10, Wien, 1927.
- Allgemein lähmende und erregbarkeitssteigernde Gifte, In: Handbuch der normalen und pathologischen Physiologie. Volume 9, Wien, 1929.
