= Joseph Babinski =

French-Polish neurologist

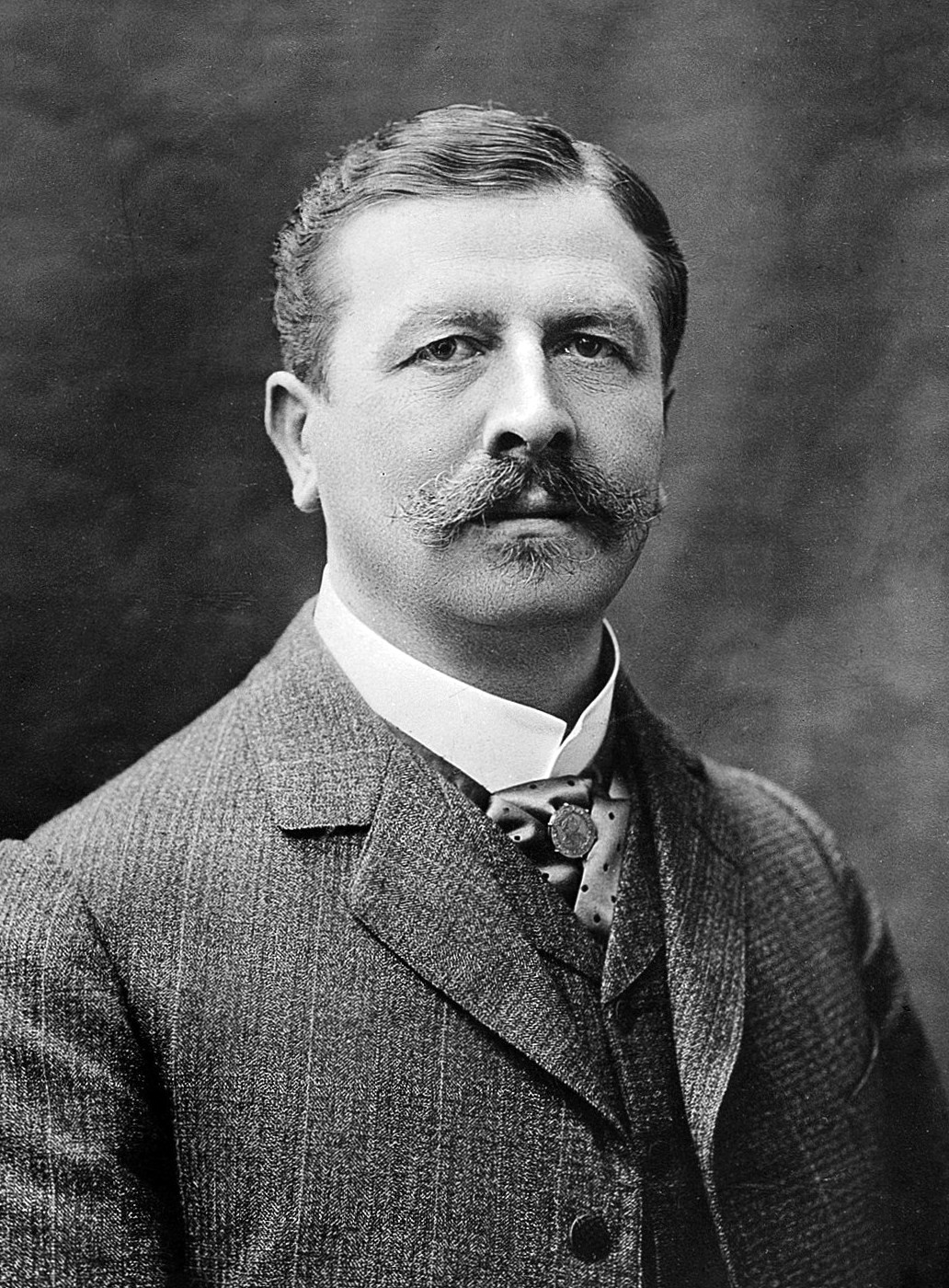
- Born: Joseph Jules François Félix Babinski (Józef Julian Franciszek Feliks Babiński); 17 November 1857; Paris, France
- Died: 29 October 1932 (aged 74); Paris, France
- Education: University of Paris
- Occupation: Neurology
- Known for: Babinski sign

Joseph Jules François Félix Babinski (Polish: Józef Julian Franciszek Feliks Babiński; 17 November 1857 – 29 October 1932) was a French-Polish professor of neurology. He is best known for his 1896 description of the Babinski sign, a pathological plantar reflex indicative of corticospinal tract damage.

== Life ==
Born in Paris, Babinski was the son of a Polish military officer, Aleksander Babiński (1824–1889), and his wife Henryka Wareńska Babińska (1819–1897), who in 1848 fled Warsaw for Paris because of a Tsarist reign of terror instigated to stall Polish attempts at achieving independence and breaking the union between Congress Poland and the Russian Empire.

Babinski received his medical degree from the University of Paris in 1884. Professor Charcot at Paris's Salpêtrière Hospital became his mentor. Charcot's 1893 death left Babinski without support, and he subsequently never participated in qualifying academic competitions. Free of teaching duties, while working at the Hôpital de la Pitié he was left with ample time to devote himself to clinical neurology. He was a masterful clinician, minimally dependent on neuropathological examinations and laboratory tests.

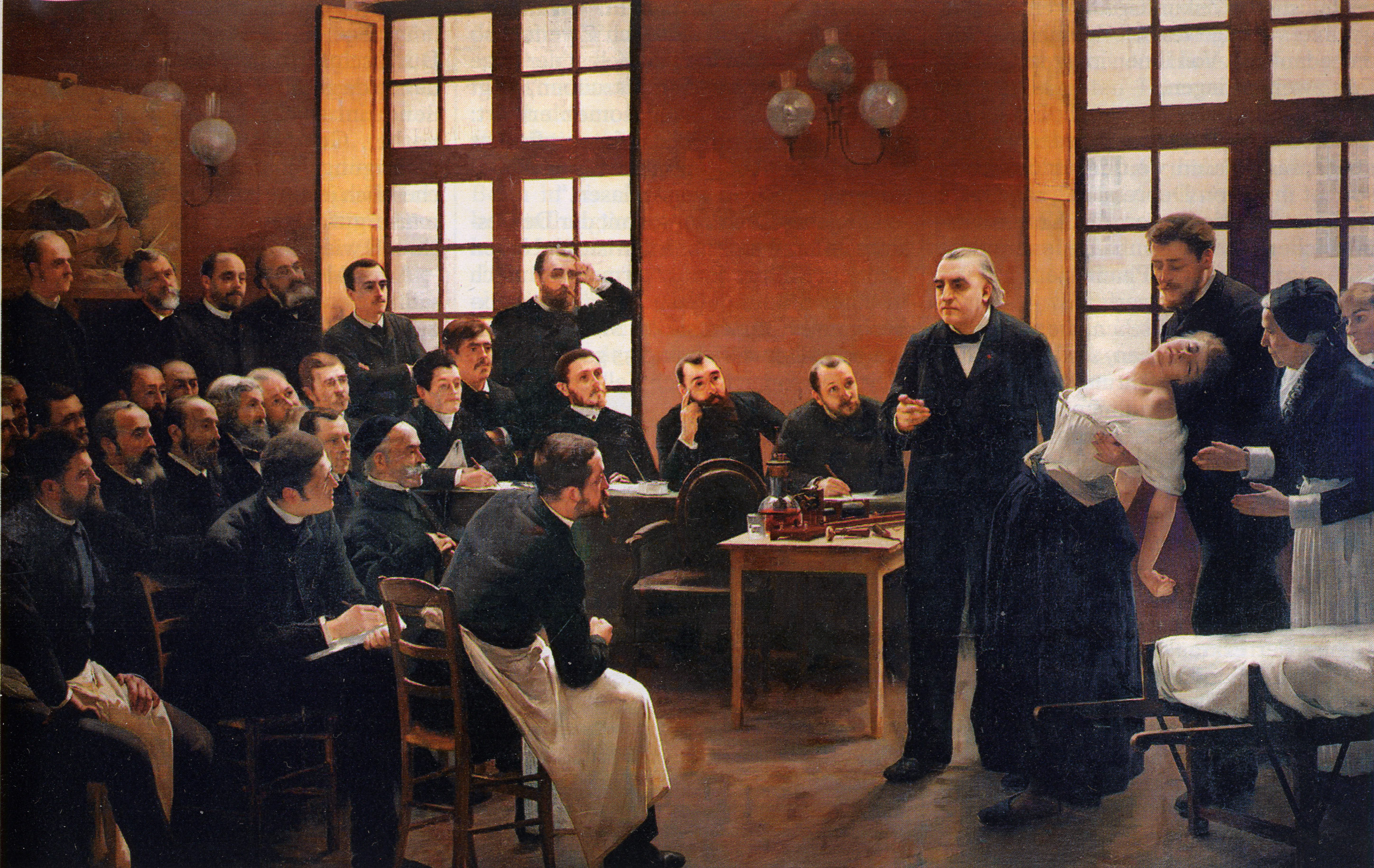
Charcot demonstrating hypnosis on a "hysterical" Salpêtrière patient, "Blanche" (Marie Wittman), who is supported by Babiński (rear). Note the similarity to the illustration on the back wall.

Babinski also took an interest in the pathogenesis of hysteria and was the first to present acceptable differential-diagnostic criteria for separating hysteria from organic diseases, and coined the concept of pithiatism. In 1914, Babinski introduced the important concept of anosognosia to name a disorder characterized by denial of illness or lack of awareness of disability.

In 1896, at a meeting of the Société de Biologie, Babiński, in a 26-line presentation, delivered the first report on the "phenomène des orteils", i.e., that while the normal reflex of the sole of the foot is a plantar reflex of the toes, an injury to the pyramidal tract will show an isolated dorsal flexion of the great toe—"Babinski's sign."

During World War I, Babinski had charge of many traumatic neurology cases at the Pitié Hospitals. He was professor of neurology at the University of Paris. Babinski wrote over 200 papers on nervous disorders. With Jules Froment he published Hysteropithiatisme en Neurologie de Guerre (1917), which was translated into English in 1918 by J. D. Rolleston as Hysteria or Pithiatism, and Reflex Nervous Disorders in the Neurology of War. Babiński published some of his works in Polish.

Babinski lived in the Boulevard Haussmann, Paris, with his elder brother, Henri Babinski, a distinguished engineer and famous food writer who, as "Ali Bab", published a classic cookbook.

With Pierre Palau, Babinski, under the pseudonym "Olaf," wrote a disturbing play, Les détraquées, which premiered at the Deux-Masques theater in 1921. The play involves the murder of a young pupil at a girls' school by the school's principal and her accomplice, a dance teacher. André Breton discusses the work in Nadja.

Babinski died in the same year as two great Polish neurologists, Edward Flatau and Samuel Goldflam. In his last three years he had suffered from Parkinson's disease. He was buried in the Cimetière des Champeaux de Montmorency in the family tomb, alongside his brother, who had died a year before.

== Recognition ==
Babinski lived to see his achievements in French neurology internationally acclaimed. He was honored by Poland in 1925 as honorary professor of the Wilno University, by the American Neurological Society, and by other foreign societies. He was also a patron of the three large neuro-psychiatric hospitals in Poland (Kraków, Wrocław, Łódź).

== Associated eponyms ==
- Babinski's sign: A pathological reflex where the great toe extends in presence of an injury to the pyramidal tract.
- Anton–Babinski syndrome: A condition characterized by denial of blindness in lesions of the occipital lobe.
  Named with neurologist Gabriel Anton.
- Babinski–Fröhlich syndrome or Adiposo-genital syndrome: Condition characterized by feminine obesity and sexual infantilism in case of pituitary tumours.
  Named with pharmacologist Alfred Fröhlich.
- Babinski–Froment syndrome: Vasomotor and trophic disorders, diffuse amyotrophy and muscle contractions subsequently to traumatic tissue damage.
  Named with neurologist Jules Froment.
- Babinski–Jarkowski rule: For localization of a medullary lesion.
  Named with neurologist Jan Jarkowski.
- Babinski–Nageotte syndrome: Syndrome seen in unilateral bulbar lesions of the medullobulbar transitional region.
  Named with neurologist Jean Nageotte.
- Babinski–Vaquez syndrome: Tabes dorsalis associated with cardiac and arterial pathology as late manifestation of syphilis.
  Named with hematologist Louis Henri Vaquez.
- Babinski–Weil test: Test for demonstration of a laterodeviation in case of vestibular disorders.
  Named with neurologist Mathieu-Pierre Weil.

== See also ==
- A Clinical Lesson at the Salpêtrière – 1887 group tableau portrait by André Brouillet

== Sources ==
- Philippon, Jacques; Jacques Poirier (2009). Joseph Babinski. New York: Oxford University Press. ISBN 978-0-19-536975-5.
