= Aleth Guzman-Nageotte =

French sculptor and medalist (1904–1978)

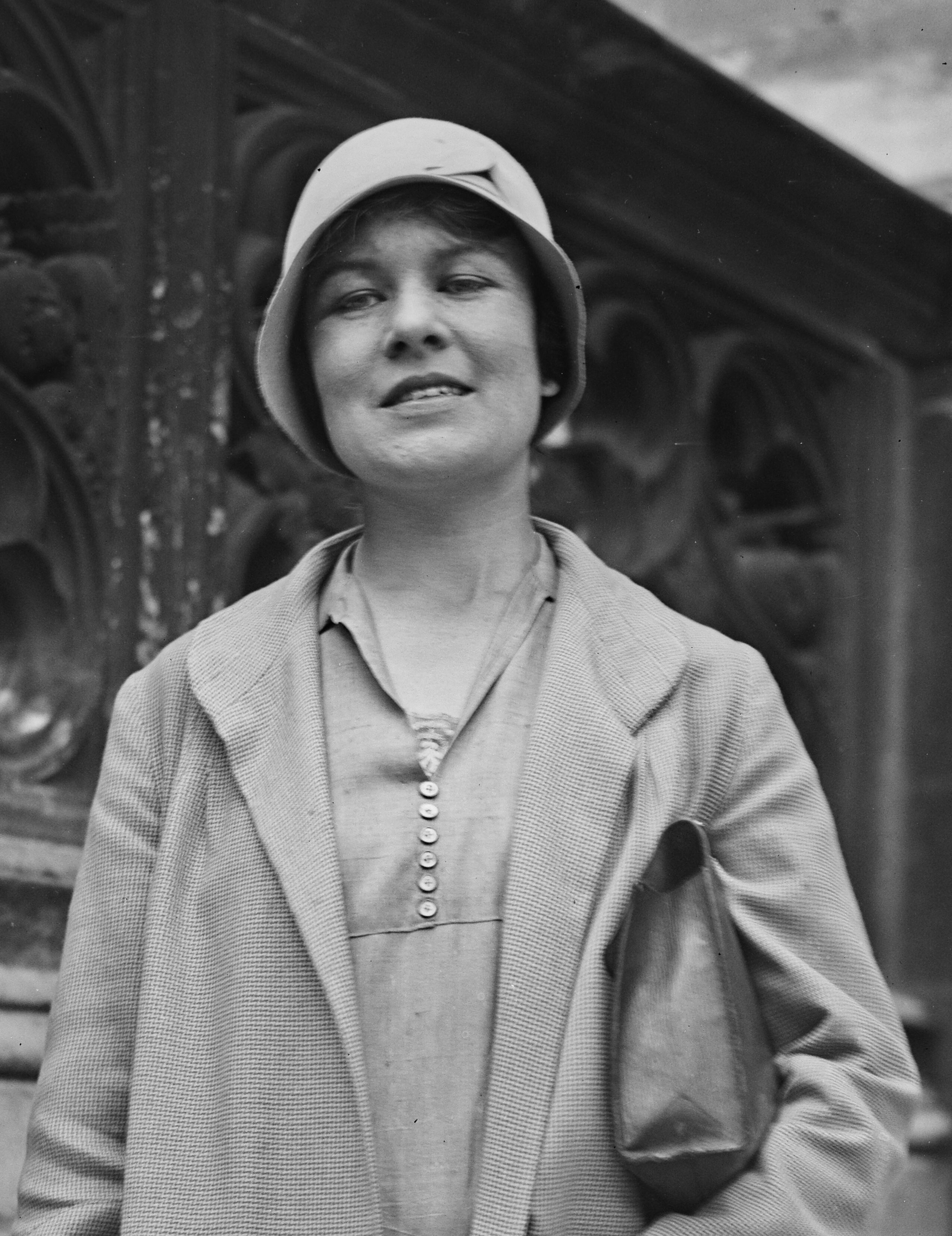
- Guzman-Nageotte in 1929
- Born: Aleth Jeanne Antoinette Guzman; 13 April 1904; Dijon, France
- Died: 23 February 1978 (aged 73); Paris, France
- Resting place: Montparnasse Cemetery
- Education: École nationale supérieure d'art de Dijon; École des Beaux-Arts
- Spouse: Eugène Nageotte
- Children: 2
- Relatives: Jean Nageotte (father-in-law); Marie Nageotte-Wilbouchewitch (mother-in-law)
- Awards: Prix de Rome, 1929

Aleth Jeanne Antoinette Guzman-Nageotte (née Guzman; 13 April 1904 – 23 February 1978) was a French sculptor and medalist.

== Biography ==
Guzman-Nageotte was born Aleth Jeanne Antoinette Guzman on 13 April 1904 in Dijon.

Guzman-Nageotte studied under Ovide Yencesse at the École nationale supérieure d'art de Dijon. Later enrolling at the École des Beaux-Arts in Paris, Guzman-Nageotte attended the workshops of Henri-Auguste Patey and Paul-Marcel Dammann for engraving and François-Léon Sicard and Henri Bouchard for sculpture.In 1929, Guzman-Nageotte won first prize at the Prix de Rome for medal engraving.

Guzman-Nageotte was married to Eugène Nageotte (1901–1965), a lecturer at the École polytechnique and son of Jean Nageotte, a neuroanatomist, and Marie Nageotte-Wilbouchewitch, a Russian–French pediatric orthopedic surgeon and composer. The couple had two sons.

Guzman-Nageotte died in Paris on 23 February 1978, and is buried at the Montparnasse Cemetery.
