= Piechowski =

Piechowski coat of arms used by some of Piechowski family

Piechowski (feminine: Piechowska, plural: Piechowscy) is a Polish surname. Some of them use Ogończyk coat of arms or Leliwa coat of arms. It may be transliterated as: Piehowski, Piehowsky, Piechowsky, Piekowski, Piechovsky.

Notable people with the surname include:

- Kazimierz Piechowski (1919–2017), Polish prisoner
- Laurin von Piechowski (born 1994), German footballer
- Mateusz Piechowski (born 1995), Polish handball player
- Michael Piechowski (born 1933), American psychologist
- Paul Piechowski (1892–1966), Lutheran theologian and physician
- Wojciech Piechowski (1849–1911), Polish painter and photographer.
