= Wacław Babiński =

Polish diplomat

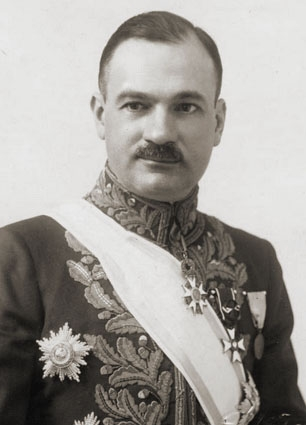
- Born: 3 April 1887; Warsaw, Congress Poland, Russian Empire
- Died: 22 July 1957 (aged 70); Montreal, Canada
- Education: Ludwig-Maximilians-Universität München
- Occupation: Diplomat
- Known for: ambassador of Poland to Yugoslavia (1929－1931) ambassador of Poland to The Hague (1931－1939)
- Spouse: Maria Wodzińska
- Children: 3
- Parent(s): Leon Babiński; Stefania Karpinska

Wacław Babiński (April 3, 1887 – July 22, 1957) was a Polish diplomat and professor at the University of Montreal.

Babiński started his diplomatic career while in Paris when the Polish government asked him to set up the Polish consulate in France. He was appointed ambassador of Poland to Yugoslavia from 1929 to 1931 and The Hague from 1931 to 1939. During World War II, he was the Canadian delegate of the Polish government-in-exile in London. After the war, along with Polkowski, Waclaw Babinski played a key role in hiding treasures of the royal collection of the Wawel Castle from the communists. Waclaw Babinski retired and died in Montreal, Canada in 1957.

== Education ==
He finished his PhD in Economics at the Ludwig-Maximilians-Universität München.

== Family ==
He was the son of Leon Babinski (1860–1932) and Stefania Karpinska (1866–1939). He had two siblings: Witold (1897–1985) and Leon Wladislaw (1891–1973). Waclaw Babinski married Maria Wodzińska (1894–1975) and had three children: Wanda (1917–1994), Ryszard (1931-) and Stanislaw (1920–1990).
