= Bolshoy Babinsky =

Bolshoy Babinsky Большой Бабинский
- Khutor
- Location within Volgograd Oblast Location within Russia
- Coordinates: 50°22′N 42°15′E
- Country: Russia
- Region: Volgograd Oblast
- District: Alexeyevsky District
- Time zone: UTC+4:00

Bolshoy Babinsky (Russian: Большой Бабинский) is a rural locality (a khutor) and the administrative center of Bolshebabinskoye Rural Settlement, Alexeyevsky District, Volgograd Oblast, Russia. The population was 297 as of 2010.

== Geography ==
Bolshoy Babinsky is located 12 km northeast of Alexeyevskaya (the district's administrative centre) by road. Kochkarinsky is the nearest rural locality. Bolshoy Babinsky is 35 km from Filonovo railway station on the Volgograd-Moscow line.
