= Akşan =

Akşan, also spelled Akšan or Aksan, is a surname. Notable people with the surname include:

- Virginia Aksan (born 1946), Canadian historian
- Nagehan Akşan (born 1988), Turkish footballer
