= Henri-Auguste Patey =

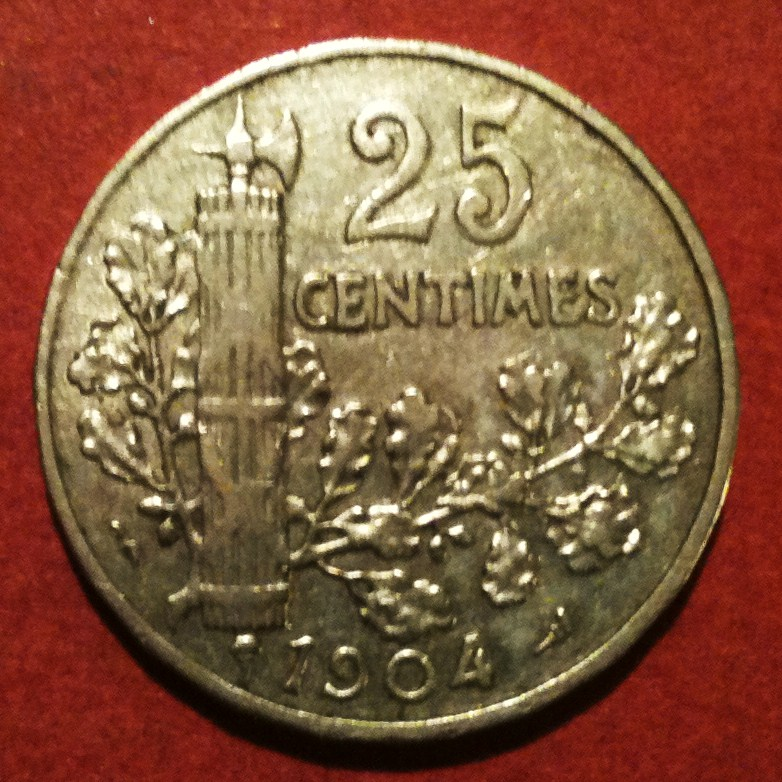
France 25 centimes by Patey 1904

Henri Auguste Jules Patey (9 September 1855, Paris – 17 May 1930, Paris) was a French sculptor, medallist and coin engraver.

== Life ==
Patey studied sculpture with Henri Chapu and engraving and medal making with Jules-Clément Chaplain. He was admitted to the École nationale supérieure des Beaux-Arts in 1873. In 1875, he won the second Prix de Rome for medal engraving and in 1881 he won the first Grand prix de Rome, also for medal engraving. He won further prizes in 1886 (third), 1887 (second) and 1894 (first). At the Universal Exhibition of 1889 he won a bronze medal. He produced many portrait medals, not only of clients, but also of relatives and friends. He also authored decorations and patterns.

In 1898, he became a knight of the Légion d'honneur. He was a member of the Académie des Beaux-Arts from 1913.

Henri-Auguste Patey died in 1930.

== Works ==
He succeeded Jean Lagrange as chief engraver of the Paris mint in 1896, a position he held until his death. He used a torch as his privy mark. In this position, Patey designed the nickel 25 Centimes 1903. This piece was generally rejected. It was the first copper-nickel coin in France. The white metal was taken for silver and the coin confused with the 1 franc, in spite of a completely different design. Coins with a different design and shape dated 1904 and 1905 were not accepted either. He did not design any other French coins after this double disappointments. Copper-nickel coins succeeded only in 1914, when holed coins were produced.

Patey was also responsible for the following French colonial and foreign coins:

- Cameroon: 50 centimes, 1 franc, 2 francs 1924-1926
- French Indo China: 5 centimes 1923-1943
- Guadeloupe: 50 centimes, 1 franc 1903, 1921
- Kingdom of Serbs, Croats and Slovenes: 50 para, 1 dinar, 2 dinara, 20 dinara 1925
- Thailand: 1 baht 1908
- Togo: 50 centimes, 1 franc, 2 francs 1924-1926

And possibly coins for the Comoros, Syria and Lebanon struck at the Paris mint.
