= Antoniewski =

Antoniewski (feminine: Antoniewska) is a Polish toponymic surname. eventually derived from the Antonius (Anton, Antoni) root name. Notable people with the surname include:

- Rafał Antoniewski (born 1980), Polish chess player
