= Maria Wodzicka =

Welfare worker, community leader

Maria Wodzicka née Maria Dunin-Borkowska (1901–1968) was a New Zealand welfare worker and community leader. She was born in Klimaszówka, Poland in 1901. She was wife of Count Kazimierz Wodzicki (1900–1987), a Polish and New Zealand mammalogist and ornithologist, 1941–1945 Consul-General for the London-based Polish government-in-exile.
