= Babinski–Nageotte syndrome =

- Other names: Babinski syndrome or Hemimedullary syndrome
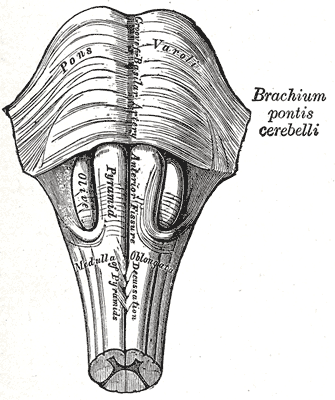
- Medulla oblongata anterior view
- Specialty: Neurology

Babinski–Nageotte syndrome is an alternating brainstem syndrome. It occurs when there is damage to the dorsolateral or posterior lateral medulla oblongata, likely syphilitic in origin. Hence it is also called the alternating medulla oblongata syndrome.

The medulla oblongata is the lower half of the brainstem. It controls autonomic functions and connects the higher levels of the brain to the spinal cord. It is responsible for regulating several basic functions of the autonomic nervous system, including respiration, cardiac function, vasodilation, and reflexes like vomiting, coughing, sneezing, and swallowing.

The rare disorder is caused by damage to a part of the brain (medullobulbar transitional area) which causes a variety of neurological symptoms, some of which affect only one side of the body. Symptoms include ipsilateral (same side) cerebellar ataxia, sensory deficits of the face, and Horner's syndrome, along with weakness and loss of sensation on the contralateral (opposite side) of the body.

It was first described in 1902 and later named after the neurologists who initially investigated it, Joseph Babinski and Jean Nageotte.

== Symptoms and signs ==
- Respiratory

Hoarseness and paralysis of the right side of the tongue and soft palate. Pneumonia and respiratory distress.

- Gastrointestinal

Dysphagia, swallowing difficulties, nausea, vomiting, and dysarthria- also known as slurred speech.

- Cardiovascular

Hypertension- also known as high blood pressure. Hyperlipidemia, which is the abnormally high levels of lipids in the blood.

- Ocular

Miosis, the abnormal contraction and constriction of the pupil of the eye. Blepharoptosis is the abnormal drooping of the upper eyelids. Enophthalmos, which is the posterior displacement of the eyeball.

- Urogenital

Postpartum amenorrhea, the abnormal absence of menstruation postpartum and galactorrhea, the milky discharge from nipples unrelated to normal lactation.

- Neurological

Ataxia, the lack of muscle control and voluntary movements.

=== The Babinski Sign ===
The Babinski sign is when the big toe moves upwards instead of downwards when plantar flexion, pointing toes, is happening. Also known as the Plantar Flex, this reflex test has become very prominent in standard neurological examinations. This test is used to determine the strength of the Corticospinal Tract. The CST is a pathway in which motor signals are sent from the brain to the lower motor neurons, also known as a descending fiber tract that starts in the cerebral cortex, the outer layer of the cerebrum, and goes through the brainstem and spinal cord. Damage anywhere on the CST can determine the presence of the Babinski sign.

The Babinski sign can be the extension of the big toe and the abduction of the other toes instead of the normal flexion reflex. Another instance of this test is where the affected patient is laying flat on their back, also known as supine position, with their hands crossed on their chest. They attempt to sit up and the affected thigh is flexed with the heel raised up and the unaffected side of the body stays flat.

== Etymology ==
Babinski-Nageotte's syndrome is often confused or associated with other syndromes. The syndromes being Reinhold syndrome (hemimedullary syndrome) and Wallenberg syndrome. Although confused for one another they are different syndromes each with their differential features. . Similar to Babinski-Nageotte's syndrome, Reinhold syndrome is also a rare disease. But as conducted through a study of 2 patients with Babinski-Nageotte's syndrome, an MRI test confirmed that Babinski-Nageotte's syndrome is its own syndrome and differs from hemi medullary syndrome.

Babinski–Nageotte syndrome is clinically distinct from Reinhold's syndrome (hemimedullary syndrome). This has led to confusion since, in many texts, the two are referred to synonymously. To clarify this confusion, a study was conducted comparing two patients exhibiting classical Babinski-Nageotte's syndrome with a patient with a clinically complete hemimedullary lesion. The magnetic resonance imaging (MRI) data from this study showed that the syndromes are not identical in appearance. Additionally, there are symptomatic differences, such as Hypoglossal palsy, a symptom of hemimedullary syndrome that is not a part of the Babinski–Nageotte syndrome. Thus, the clinical features and MRI appearances of the patient with a hemimedullary lesion are not consistent with Babinski-Nageotte Syndrome and the terminology of these distinct syndromes should not be used synonymously.

Horner's syndrome is the disruption of a nerve pathway from the brain to the face and eye on one side of the body. This also results in a decreased pupil size (miosis), a drooping eyelid (ptosis) and decreased sweating on the affected side of your face (anhidrosis).

== History ==
Babinski-Nageotte Syndrome was discovered in 1902 by two French men, Joseph Babinksi and Jean Nageotte. What is now known as the medically popular "Babinski Test" was discovered in 1899. Babinksi and Nageotte also co-wrote a book on cerebrospinal fluid.

Joseph Babinski was a French neurologist, born on November 17, 1857. He studied under the "father of Neurology" Jean-Martin Charcot. Babinksi conducted research on multiple sclerosis, post traumatic stress disorders, and the distinction between mental and physical disorders. He, along with Austrian-American pharmacologist Alfred Fröhlich, discovered Babinski-Fröhlich syndrome. As a doctor, Babinski did not like to converse with his patients, he asked few questions and often stayed quiet. He did not have many friends nor did he like politics, therefore he was never given the title of professorship. Babinksi died on October 29 of 1932 in his hometown of Paris.

Jean Nageotte was a neuroanatomist, neurologist, and neuropathologist from Dijon, France. He was born on February 8, 1866. Nageotte earned his medical degree in 1893, and specialized in research of the nervous system, and the importance of microscopic anatomy. Nageotte wrote an article in 1910 about how glial cells behave, which was later recognized as glial cells and their neurotransmitters. He died on July 22 of 1948 in Paris, France.

== Case reports ==
There have been few cases of this disease documented in detail and actually diagnosed with Babinski–Nageotte syndrome since its discovery in 1902. In one case this syndrome occurred in a woman that was 10 days into her postpartum period and had delivered her baby via Cesarean section. She had complaints of dysarthria, dysphagia, dizziness, nausea, vomiting, and weakness of left arm and leg. After looking into her medical records there was only a sudden development of these symptoms one hour before being admitted to the hospital and additional symptoms of dysphagia, dysarthria, and weakness of left arm and leg. The only background health information found was she had given birth via Caesarean section 10 days prior and was diagnosed with preeclampsia in her 33rd week of pregnancy. During their first evaluation, it was noted that they appeared to be in a stuporous state and had dysarthric speech, eye movement was examined and found vertical and horizontal nystagmus. During cranial examination there was flattening of left sided nasolabial sulcus with abnormal gag reflex observed. In the motor system examination, the left upper and lower extremity muscle power were 3/5 level and her Babinski reflex was found to be an extensor response on the left side. During the sensory system examination, pain and thermal senses of the patient were decreased on the left side of the body and cerebellar tests were abnormal on the right side. Evaluation of the cranial MRI screening of the patient with the misdoubt of cerebrovascular disease showed results that were consistent with diffusion restriction which was thought to be acute infarct extending to inferior cerebellar peduncle with involvement of right sided posterolateral medulla oblongata. In magnetic resonance angiography (MRA), stenosis was seen in the distal segment of right vertebral artery.

In addition, there was another case documented of an 81-year-old woman with hypertension and diabetes presented with left hemiplegia, reduction of superficial perception on the right side of the face and on the left side below the neck, and the cerebellar ataxia of the right limbs. Right Horner's syndrome, right facial paresis, dysphagia, and paralysis of the right soft palate and ride side of the tongue were present. Cranial MRI showed a right hemi medullary infarct, and magnetic resonance angiography showered severe stenosis of the right vertebral artery.
