= Jean Nageotte =

French neuroanatomist

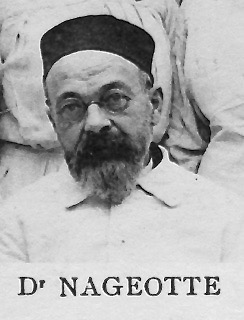
- Born: 8 February 1866; Dijon, France
- Died: 22 July 1948 (aged 82)
- Spouse: Marie Nageotte-Wilbouchewitch (m. 1891; died 1941)
- Children: 3
- Relatives: Aleth Guzman-Nageotte (daughter-in-law)

Academic work
- Discipline: neuroanatomy
- Institutions: Collège de France
- Main interests: anatomical research of the nervous system

Jean Nageotte (8 February 1866 – 22 July 1948) was a French neuroanatomist born in Dijon.

He obtained his medical degree in Paris in 1893, and afterwards was associated with the Hôpital Bicêtre and Salpêtrière. He succeeded Louis-Antoine Ranvier (1835–1922) in what then became the chair of comparative histology at the Collège de France.

Nageotte specialized in anatomical research of the nervous system, and in his work stressed the importance of microscopic anatomy. He performed research of nerve fibers and the myelin sheath, and conducted studies involving connective tissue. He provided a description of boutons terminaux (terminal buttons) of spinal nerves, and did extensive work with nerve grafting. In addition he investigated tabes dorsalis, and with Joseph Babinski (1857–1932), the Babinski-Nageotte syndrome was described. This syndrome is a complex of symptoms associated with medullary lesions. He documented this disorder in a treatise called Hémiasynergie, latéropulsion et miosis bulbaire. Also with Babinski, he co-wrote a book on cerebrospinal fluid.

In his 1910 article, he surmised that glial cells behaves like an endocrine organ and secretes several molecules into the blood. Albeit the importance of this proposal had not been recognized in his time, today we know that glial cells have neurotransmitter receptors and even more, release neurotransmitters with similar mechanisms as neurons.

Other eponyms associated with Jean Nageotte:

- Nageotte cells: mononuclear cells found in the cerebrospinal fluid; 1 or 2 Nageotte cells per cubic millimeter are typically found in healthy individuals, but larger numbers of these cells are an indication of disease.
- Nageotte's radicular nerve: Nageotte placed the initial lesion of tabes dorsalis in the root component of the radicular nerve.

== Personal life ==
Nageotte married Marie Nageotte-Wilbouchewitch (1864–1941), a Russian–French pediatric orthopedic surgeon and composer, on 28 December 1891. The couple had three children including Eugène Nageotte (1901–1965), a lecturer at the École polytechnique and husband of the sculptor and medalist Aleth Guzman-Nageotte.

== Written works ==
- Tabès et paralysie générale (Tabes and general paralysis), Paris, Steinheil, 1893.
- Contribution à l’étude du cytodiagnostic du liquide céphalo-rachidien dans les affections nerveuses (Contribution to the study of cytodiagnostics of cerebrospinal fluid in nervous disorders) Tours, Maretheux, 1901.
- Pathogénie du tabes dorsal (Pathogenesis of tabes dorsalis) Paris, Naud, 1903.
- La Structure fine du système nerveux (The delicate structure of the nervous system), Paris, Maloine, 1905.
- L’Organisation de la matière dans ses rapports avec la vie Paris, 1922.
- Morphologie des gels lipoïdes, myéline, cristaux liquides, vacuoles (Morphology of lipoidal gel, myelin, liquid crystals, vacuoles), Paris, Hermann, 1937
