= Kazimierz Wodzicki =

Polish–New Zealand ornithologist

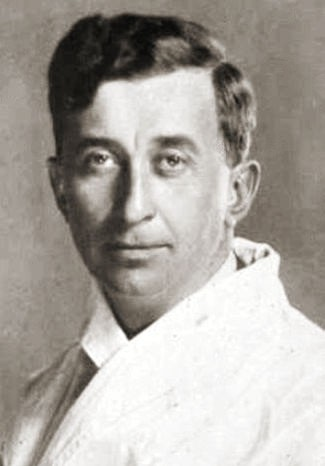
Kazimierz Wodzicki

Count Kazimierz Antoni von Granöw Wodzicki OBE FRSNZ (4 February 1900 – 15 June 1987) was a Polish-born New Zealand mammalogist and ornithologist. He served as a Consul-General to the Polish government-in-exile in New Zealand towards the end of the Second World War and aided numerous Polish refugees to settle there.

== Biography ==
Born to Maria Dzieduszycka and Count Alexander Louis Wodzicki of the Polish nobility, he received his early education in Cracow and Lwów (Lviv) and received a doctorate from the Jagiellonian University in 1925. His grandfather Kazimierz Wodzici (1816–1889) was also a noted naturalist. He became Professor of Anatomy and Histology at the University College of Agriculture in Warsaw in 1935. In 1939, following the German and Soviet invasions of Poland, Kazimierz escaped arrest to Italy while his wife Maria Wodzicka, a skilled mountaineer, guided other refugees over the mountains across the southern border of Poland and then took the children with her to unite with as a family in Paris. The family then moved to England and then to New Zealand in 1941 where he became Consul-General for the London-based Polish government-in-exile. When the Soviets occupied Poland, the family estates were taken and his father, Count Wodzicki was deported to Siberia, where he died.

In New Zealand Wodzicki, who would become familiar to New Zealand ornithologists as "Kazio", continued his ornithological interests by joining the Ornithological Society of New Zealand and contributing frequently to its journal. At the end of the war he stayed in New Zealand and worked for the Department of Scientific and Industrial Research (DSIR) conducting research on the impact of introduced mammals. He was also one of the zoologists studying small introduced mammals on the 1949 New Zealand American Fiordland Expedition. The results of his investigations were published in 1950 as Introduced Mammals of New Zealand: an Ecological and Economic Survey (DSIR Bulletin 98), and led to the establishment of the Animal Ecology Section of DSIR, with Wodzicki as its first director. His son Antoni Jontek Wodzicki (15 July 1934 – 30 November 1999) became a geologist in New Zealand. Mount Wodzicki was named after him.

Wodzicki's other research activities included studies on Australasian gannets at Cape Kidnappers, rooks and the birdlife of the Waikanae estuary, as well as investigating problems with introduced rodents on Tokelau and Niue. Along with J. E. C. Flux he rediscovered an introduced population of the then supposedly extinct Parma wallaby on Kawau Island.

In 1962 Wodzicki was elected a member of the Royal Society of New Zealand. In the 1976 New Year Honours, he was appointed an Officer of the Order of the British Empire, for services to science and public services to the people of Niue and the Tokelau Islands.
