= Jules Konopinski =

German-born British anti-fascist activist

Julius Hillel "Jules" Konopinski (18 February 1930 – 16 July 2023) was a German-born British anti-fascist activist. He was a member of the 43 Group and a co-founder of the 62 Committee, organizations formed to counter post-war fascism.

== Early life and education ==
Konopinski was born in Breslau, Germany (now Wrocław, Poland), to Polish Jewish parents, Isaac and Tauba Konopinski. In 1938, his father, a World War I German Army veteran, was arrested by the Gestapo but escaped to London. Konopinski and his mother fled Germany after selling their property and paying a state-imposed tax. They traveled through Poland and sailed from Danzig (Gdańsk) to London.

Upon arriving in the United Kingdom, Konopinski learned English, adding to his knowledge of German and Yiddish. He was educated at Parmiter's School and Hackney Downs School, where he was a contemporary of Harold Pinter. During this period, he experienced Antisemitism, leading to physical altercations.

== Activism ==
Konopinski's activism began after World War II in response to the resurgence of Oswald Mosley's fascist movement in London. His motivation was influenced by having lost nine aunts and uncles in the Holocaust.

=== The 43 Group ===
In 1947, Konopinski joined the 43 Group, an organization primarily of Jewish ex-servicemen that used direct action to disrupt fascist activities. Within the group, he was known by the nickname "Mad Jules." He described the group's confrontational tactics as a "necessary defence" for the Jewish community. In March 1948, he was arrested at a fascist meeting and charged with possession of an offensive weapon; he was later acquitted at the Old Bailey.

=== Palmach and the 62 Committee ===
In the summer of 1948, Konopinski traveled to Israel to fight in the Palmach during the Israeli War of Independence, where he trained with Vidal Sassoon. After returning to the UK, he was active with the 43 Group until it disbanded in 1950.

In 1962, in response to renewed fascist activity led by figures such as Colin Jordan, Konopinski and other former 43 Group members formed the 62 Committee. He remained a member until the group ceased its activities in 1975. During his time with the committee, he participated in an incident in which Oswald Mosley was physically assaulted.

== Personal life ==
He married Eleanor King in 1956, and the couple had two daughters Carolyne and Michele. Following his wife's death in 1993, his partner was Valerie, with whom he spent his final 27 years.

In his later years, he had multiple cancers and two heart attacks. In 2021, he met with Ivo Mosley, a descendant of Oswald Mosley. Jules Konopinski died from a brain tumour on July 16, 2023, at the age of 93.
