= Henri Babinski =

French mining engineer and food writer (1855–1931)

Babinski, 1912

Henri Babinski (2 July 1855 – 20 August 1931), who wrote under the pen-name Ali-Bab, was a French gastronome and food writer. After a successful career as a mining engineer he retired to his native Paris, where he wrote Gastronomie pratique ("Practical Gastronomy").

Born to Polish refugees, Babinski, together with his younger brother Joseph, was educated at the Polish school in Paris. Babinski then studied at the National School of Mines, before working in three continents as a consultant mining engineer. On retirement he joined his brother in a flat in Paris, where he wrote his book. It was his only book, but such was its success that he revised it for four new editions between its first publication in 1907 and 1928, and it ran to more than a thousand pages.

The book was not translated into English until 1974, when it was hailed in The New York Times as a major contribution to gastronomic literature.

== Life and career ==
=== Early years ===
Henri Joseph Séverin Babinski was born in Montparnasse, Paris on 2 July 1855, the elder son of Alexandre Babinski and his wife Henriette, née Weren. The couple, originally known as Aleksander and Henryeta, were born and married in Poland and fled to Paris after the Polish uprising in 1848. A younger son, Joseph, was born in 1857. Alexandre found employment working for the Paris municipal authorities as a surveyor-engineer, but in 1863 he returned to Poland to take part in a new uprising, leaving his wife and sons in Paris. The two boys were enrolled at the École polonaise – an establishment later described by Henri as one of ferocious austerity – and, from 1870, at the Lycée René Descartes. Joseph remained there until 1875, receiving his baccalauréat; Henri left before him, entering the École Nationale des Mines (National School of Mines) in 1874.

=== Mining engineer ===
Babinski graduated as a civil mining engineer in 1878 and in 1880 started to travel extensively, studying mineral deposits in many countries. He worked in South America, in the Equatorial region; in the western United States; in French Guiana and northern Italy. In 1893, returning to Chile, he set up a system for towing the coal barges through the Strait of Magellan using locally mined coal to power the tugs. In 1896 he went to Brazil to examine diamond mines in the state of Bahia, where he set up a successful mining venture.

There was little by way of good food in many of the places in which he worked. He later wrote:

I reached the age of twenty-five without having the slightest idea of [the culinary art]. ... My companions and I were usually reduced to the products of hunting and fishing, which the natives would usually simply grill or boil without any other preparation. We had little means of varying our menus except a few preserved goods of which we greatly tired. We had to struggle against lack of appetite and the resulting anaemia. Therefore, the slightest innovation in the preparation of the food was received with enthusiasm, as long as it gave us a taste sensation that contrasted with the usual monotony.

=== Retirement ===
After more than twenty years working as a successful mining consultant in places as far apart as Siberia and the Transvaal Babinski retired to Paris. His mother had died in 1897 and his father in 1899, leaving Joseph – by now a leading neurologist – in sole occupation of the family apartment at 170 bis Boulevard Haussmann. Henri joined him there, and, as a 2009 biography puts it, "Within their bachelor quarters, Henri took the lead, compensating for all the years spent in camping conditions". Thereafter Babinski travelled only for pleasure. In 1909 he visited Constantinople, curious about Turkish cuisine such as the pilaf, the imam bayıldı and the kebab. Later he went from country to country, from province to province, collecting the elements of his book, Gastronomie pratique "Practical Gastronomy".

It is not known why Babinski chose the pen-name "Ali-Bab" for his book. Fellow writers have speculated that "Ali" might stand for "other" and "Bab" for "Babinski", thus making Henri the "other Babinski", his younger brother being better-known to the public. Another theory is that the name alludes to Babinski's visits to Turkey, drawing on the name of Ali Baba, of the One Thousand and One Nights. A third suggestion is that it could be a nostalgic reference to his Polish roots, as baba is the Polish word for cake (as in rum baba).

=== Gastronomie pratique ===
The book, published by Flammarion in 1907, was an immediate success, and the author revised and expanded it across four new editions between then and 1928. His last edition included an extended essay on the wines of France, in which, according to an obituarist, "he exalted in a precise and truly marvellous style their respective qualities. All of them paraded in their ranks: wines from Saumur, Arbois or Anjou, wines from the Côtes du Rhône, Hermitage, Châteauneuf-du-Pape, and the powerful Bordeaux and magnificent Burgundies". In addition to the substantial sales of the book, this brought the author a prize of 10,000 francs (Note: equivalent to €7,418 in 2025) from the Comité de la Vigne. In 1960, Elizabeth David wrote of the seventh and final edition, "The proportions and ingredients for every recipe are given, with the precision of a scientist writing a formula, down to the last gramme. It is a remarkable work by any standards; for an amateur cook it is a quite extraordinary achievement".

Ali-Bab divided the book into sections. It opens with a survey of cooking from prehistoric times to the present, in Europe and elsewhere. A section on the principles of cooking, and then sections on stocks and sauces, soups, mushrooms – a long section of 20 pages, wine (all French) and entertaining. There are then sections on menus for luncheons and dinners ranging from the small and informal to large and grand, and then, the bulk of the book, detailed recipes, divided into the familiar sections followed in 19th and 20th-century cookery books: soups, hors d'oeuvres, eggs, seafood, fish, game, meat, poultry, potatoes and other vegetables, desserts, preserves and drinks. The last section deals with diets for overweight gourmands, and received the approval of several medical journals.

His recipes are not exclusively French: they include Italian pasta dishes and risottos, as well as Yorkshire pudding and plum pudding from England, and grog in both American and Indian versions.

After Gastronomie pratique was published, Ali-Bab was dubbed "the Brillat-Savarin of the 20th century". The book was not translated into English until 1974; (Note: The translator, Elizabeth Benson, included about a third of Ali-Bab's recipes: the English version runs to 338 pages as opposed to the 1281 pages of the French volume.) Craig Claiborne in The New York Times hailed the publication as "An event that is to our minds almost as important as the publication of the English language version of Larousse Gastronomique in 1961". Julia Child wrote, "Ali-Bab is, I think, immediately appealing to anyone who loves cooking because his is the work of a devoted and tremendously well informed amateur chef who is addressing himself to people of like mind. In fact he unhesitatingly assumes that the reader will be glad indeed to go to any reasonable lengths to produce a magnificent dish".

=== Death ===
Babinski died in Paris on 20 August 1931. Le Figaro said:

Ali-Bab is dead This is news that we do not want to believe. A man who has done so much for the pleasure of his contemporaries, who has given them so many charming secrets to keep themselves happy and healthy, how can he be overtaken by cruel destiny? He was a great philosopher. He had known how to look at life. He had seen so many things, and how the physical acts on the moral, how the soul is a prisoner of its body. His was serene. He poured out his remarks by turns profound and subtle, gruff and indulgent. They should have been collected as he collected his culinary recipes. The practical wisdom of Ali-Bab would have been a counterpart to his practical gastronomy.

In London, Truth commented:

Ali-Bab is dead, and cookery has lost one of its greatest and sanest devotees. Henri Babinski was a Pole who loved his country and adored Paris. ... He published a volume on cookery, and the world seized on it. The last edition, which appeared in 1928 ... is full of wit, of wisdom, of practicality.

Babinski was buried in the Cimetière des Champeaux de Montmorency in the family tomb. His brother, who died a year later, was also interred there.

== Notes, references and sources ==
=== Sources ===
- Babinski, Henri ("Ali-Bab") (1923). Gastronomie pratique (in French) (Third ed.). Paris: Flammarion. OCLC 716033342.
- Benson, Elizabeth (1974). "About Henri Babinski". The Encyclopedia of Practical Gastronomy. New York: McGraw-Hill. ISBN 978-0-07-001062-8.
- David, Elizabeth (1964) [1960]. French Provincial Cooking. London: Penguin. OCLC 27037523.
- David, Elizabeth (1986) [1984]. An Omelette and a Glass of Wine. London: Penguin. ISBN 978-0-14-046721-5.
- Philippon, Jacques; Jacques Poirier (2009). Joseph Babinski. New York: Oxford University Press. ISBN 978-0-19-536975-5.
