= Kazimierz Wodzicki (ornithologist, born 1816) =

Polish nobleman and ornithologist

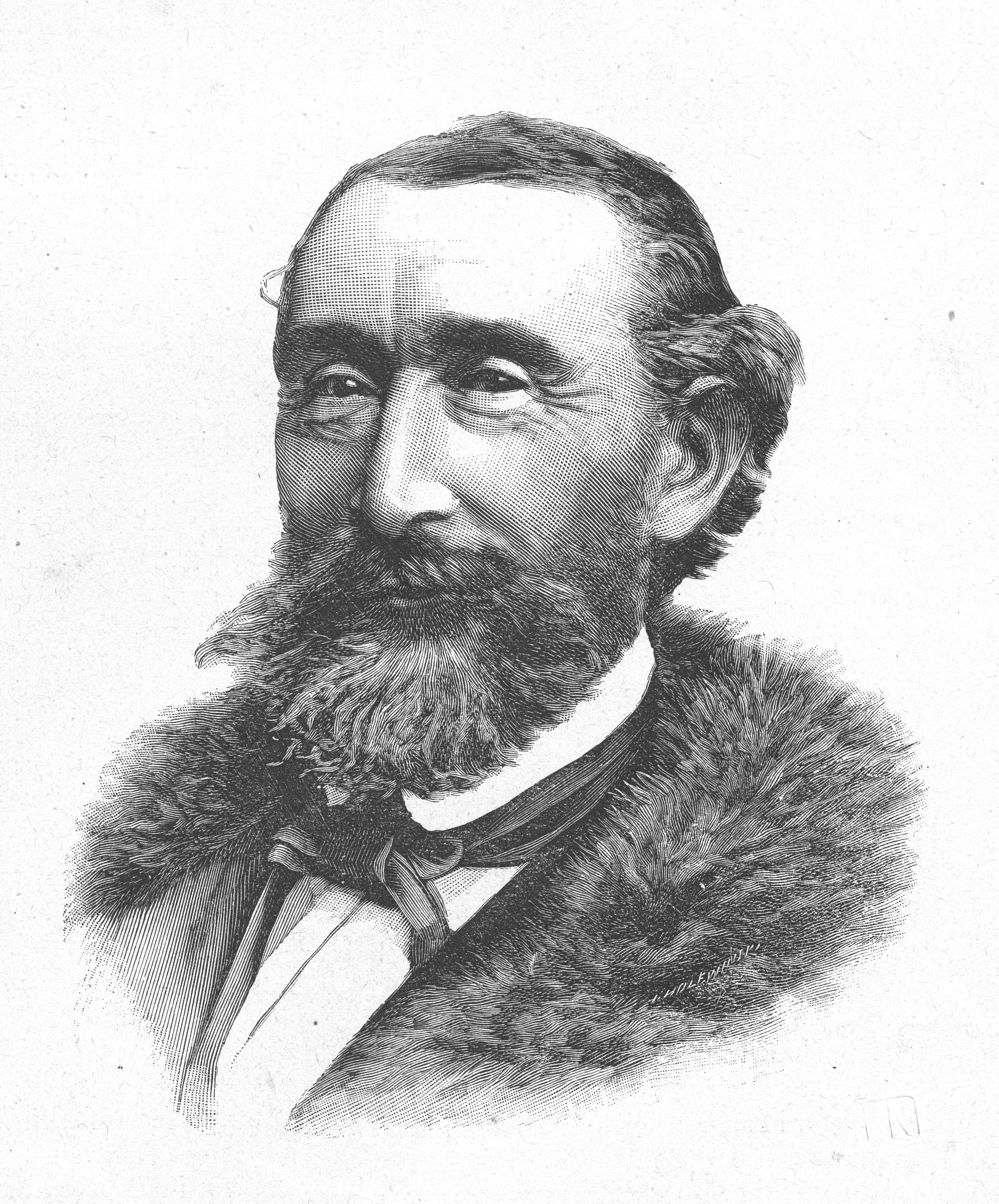

Kazimierz Stanisław Michał Wodzicki (26 September 1816 – 20 October 1889) was a Polish nobleman from Galicia who served as a member of the Imperial Council from 1861 to 1863. He was also an ornithologist and authored several books on birds.

== Biography ==
Wodzicki was born in Korzkiew, as the youngest son of Count Józef Wodzicki and Countess Petronella Jablonowska. He studied natural sciences in Kraków and abroad and developed interest in birds. From 1861, he was a member of the Galician Regional Assembly representing landowners. The assembly chose him for the Imperial Council and served until 1863. He married Countess von dem Broele (1826-1856) in 1845 and Josepha Dzieduszycka in 1858. He wrote extensively on birds, farming, and nature in the region. He died on his estate in Olejów.

His writings include:

- Systematyczny spis ptaków uważanych w dawnej ziemi krakowskiej = Systematic description of the birds observed on the former territory of Kraków, printed in the "Biblioteka Warszowska" 1850
- Wycieczka ornitologiczna u Tatry i Karpaty = Ornithological trip to the Tatra Mountains and the Carpathians (Leszno 1851, 8°)
- O wpływie jaki wywierają ptaki na gospodarstwo = Of the influence of birds on agriculture (Lemberg 1852; 2nd ed. Leszno 1852, 8°.)
- O hodowaniu owiec = the Breeding of Sheep (Lemberg 1853, 8°.)
