= Adiposogenital dystrophy =

- Other names: Babiński-Fröhlich syndrome (commonly associated with slipped capital femoral epiphysis),Froelich's syndrome, Fröhlich's Syndrome, Hypothalamic Infantilism-Obesity, Launois-Cleret Syndrome, Sexual Infantilism}
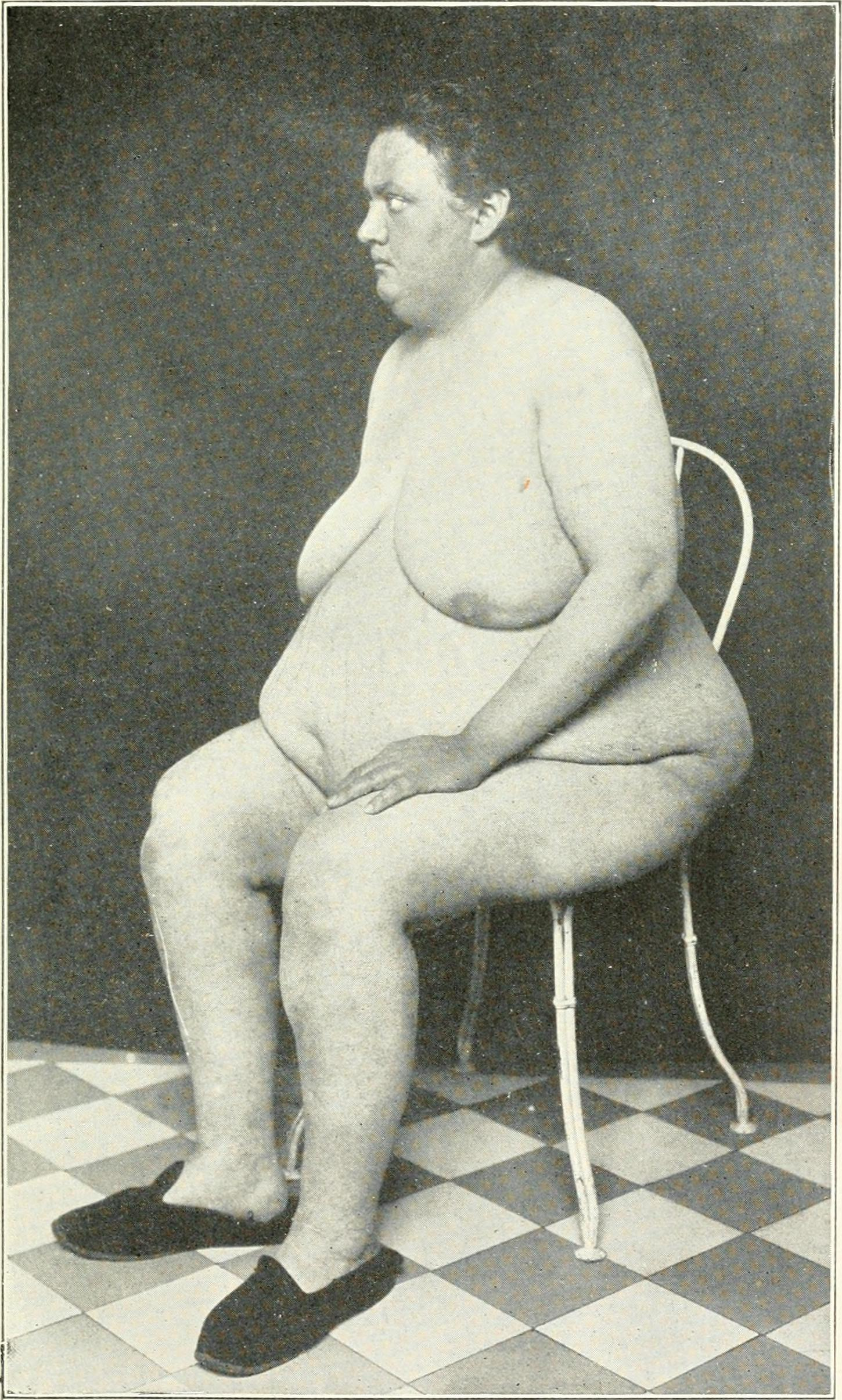
- Specialty: Endocrinology

Adiposogenital dystrophy is a condition that may be caused by tertiary hypogonadism originating from decreased levels in GnRH. Low levels of GnRH has been associated with defects of the feeding centers of the hypothalamus, leading to an increased consumption of food and thus caloric intake.

== Diagnosis ==
Laboratory analysis of the urine from children with Froehlich syndrome typically reveals low levels of pituitary hormones, and that finding may suggest the presence of a lesion on the pituitary. Additional tests are needed before a definite diagnosis of Froehlich syndrome may be made.
