= Sucha =

Sucha or Suchá may refer to:

== Places ==
=== Czech Republic ===
- Suchá, a municipality and village in the Vysočina Region
- Suchá, a village and part of Havlíčkův Brod in the Vysočina Region
- Suchá, a village and part of Hlavňovice in the Plzeň Region
- Suchá, a village and part of Jáchymov in the Karlovy Vary Region
- Suchá, a village and part of Nechanice in the Hradec Králové Region
- Suchá, a village and part of Nejdek in the Karlovy Vary Region
- Suchá, a village and part of Litomyšl in the Pardubice Region
- Suchá, a village and part of Stebno in the Ústí nad Labem Region

=== Poland ===
- Sucha, Kuyavian-Pomeranian Voivodeship (north-central Poland)
- Sucha Beskidzka in Lesser Poland Voivodeship (south Poland)
- Sucha, Łódź Voivodeship (central Poland)
- Sucha, Białobrzegi County in Masovian Voivodeship (east-central Poland)
- Sucha, Radom County in Masovian Voivodeship (east-central Poland)
- Sucha, Greater Poland Voivodeship (west-central Poland)
- Sucha, Lubusz Voivodeship (west Poland)
- Sucha, Opole Voivodeship (south-west Poland)
- Sucha, Pomeranian Voivodeship (north Poland)
- Sucha, Warmian-Masurian Voivodeship (north Poland)
- Sucha, Myślibórz County in West Pomeranian Voivodeship (north-west Poland)
- Sucha, Szczecinek County in West Pomeranian Voivodeship (north-west Poland)
- Sucha, Świdwin County in West Pomeranian Voivodeship (north-west Poland)

== People ==
- Graham Sucha (born 1986), Canadian politician
- Růžena Suchá (1907–1989), Czech chess master
- Sucha Singh (disambiguation)
