= Gąsiorowski =

Gąsiorowski (feminine: Gąsiorowska) is a Polish noble family name, after Gąsiorów, Jarocin County, bearer of the Ślepowron coat of arms.

The surname may refer to:

- Andrzej Gąsiorowski
- Antoni Gąsiorowski
- Gérard Gasiorowski
- Janusz Gąsiorowski (1889–1949), Polish general
- Mark J. Gasiorowski (born 1954), American political scientist
- Florian Gąsiorowski, pen name of Henryk Struve
- Maiden name of Małgorzata Bocheńska
- Roma Gąsiorowska (born 1981), Polish film actress
- Yarek Gasiorowski (born 2005), Spanish-Polish footballer
