= Hochfeld =

Hochfeld may refer to:

- Hochfeld, Duisburg
- Hochfeld, Manitoba, Canada
- Hochfeld, Namibia
- Hochfeld, the German name for Fofeldea village, Nocrich Commune, Sibiu County, Romania
- Hochfeld, the German name for Bieździadów, Jarocin County, Greater Poland Voivodeship, in west-central Poland.
