= Chwalęcin, Greater Poland Voivodeship =

Chwalęcin
- Village
- Location within Poland
- Coordinates: 52°01′41″N 17°22′25″E
- Country: Poland
- Voivodeship: Greater Poland
- County: Środa
- Gmina: Nowe Miasto nad Wartą

Chwalęcin [xfaˈlɛnt͡ɕin] is a village in the administrative district of Gmina Nowe Miasto nad Wartą, within Środa County, Greater Poland Voivodeship, in west-central Poland.

== Transport ==
Chwalęcin is served by the Chwalęcin skrzyżowanie bus stop operated by JLA, a service run by the county of Jarocin, connecting residents with neighbouring Jarocin, Kruczynek, and Kolniczki on line 2A.
