= Boguszyn =

Boguszyn may refer to the following places in Poland:

- Boguszyn, Lower Silesian Voivodeship (south-west Poland)
- Boguszyn, West Pomeranian Voivodeship (north-west Poland)
- Boguszyn, Leszno County in Greater Poland Voivodeship (west-central Poland)
- Boguszyn, Gmina Nowe Miasto nad Wartą, Środa County in Greater Poland Voivodeship (west-central Poland)
