= Brzostkow =

Brzostkow may refer to either of the following places in Poland:

- Brzostków, west-central Poland
- Brzóstków, south-central Poland
