= Magnuszewice =

- Village
- Location within Poland
- Coordinates: 51°56′N 17°36′E
- Country: Poland
- Voivodeship: Greater Poland
- County: Jarocin
- Gmina: Kotlin
- Population: 770

Magnuszewice [maɡnuʂɛˈvit͡sɛ] is a village in the administrative district of Gmina Kotlin, within Jarocin County, Greater Poland Voivodeship, in west-central Poland.
