= Lubinia Mała =

- Village
- Location within Poland
- Coordinates: 51°59′47″N 17°39′43″E
- Country: Poland
- Voivodeship: Greater Poland
- County: Jarocin
- Gmina: Żerków

Lubinia Mała [luˈbiɲa ˈmawa] is a village in the administrative district of Gmina Żerków, within Jarocin County, Greater Poland Voivodeship, in west-central Poland.

Shortly before 1610 Łukasz Suchorzewski built wooden church in Lubinia Mała.

In 19th century owner of Lubinia Mała was Stanisław Mycielski, later (in 1891) Mr Fischer.
