= Chwalęcin =

Chwalęcin may refer to the following places in Poland:

- Chwalęcin, Lower Silesian Voivodeship (south-west Poland)
- Chwalęcin, Greater Poland Voivodeship (west-central Poland)
- Chwalęcin, Warmian-Masurian Voivodeship (north Poland)
