= Raszewy, Jarocin County =

Raszewy
- Village
- Location within Poland
- Coordinates: 52°5′0″N 17°35′51″E
- Country: Poland
- Voivodeship: Greater Poland
- County: Jarocin
- Gmina: Żerków
- Population: 687

Raszewy [raˈʂɛvɨ] is a village in the administrative district of Gmina Żerków, within Jarocin County, Greater Poland Voivodeship, in west-central Poland.
