= Przybysław, Jarocin County =

Przybysław
- Settlement
- Location within Poland
- Coordinates: 52°6′N 17°37′E
- Country: Poland
- Voivodeship: Greater Poland
- County: Jarocin
- Gmina: Żerków
- Population: 360

Przybysław [pʂɨˈbɨswaf] is a settlement in the administrative district of Gmina Żerków, within Jarocin County, Greater Poland Voivodeship, in west-central Poland.
