= Sławoszew =

- Village
- Location within Poland
- Coordinates: 51°57′N 17°41′E
- Country: Poland
- Voivodeship: Greater Poland
- County: Jarocin
- Gmina: Kotlin

Sławoszew [swaˈvɔʂɛf] is a village in the administrative district of Gmina Kotlin, within Jarocin County, Greater Poland Voivodeship, in west-central Poland.
