= Szczonów =

- Village
- Location within Poland
- Coordinates: 52°7′41″N 17°35′10″E
- Country: Poland
- Voivodeship: Greater Poland
- County: Jarocin
- Gmina: Żerków

Szczonów [ˈʂt͡ʂɔnuf] is a village in the administrative district of Gmina Żerków, within Jarocin County, Greater Poland Voivodeship, in west-central Poland.
