= Góra, Jarocin County =

Góra
- Village
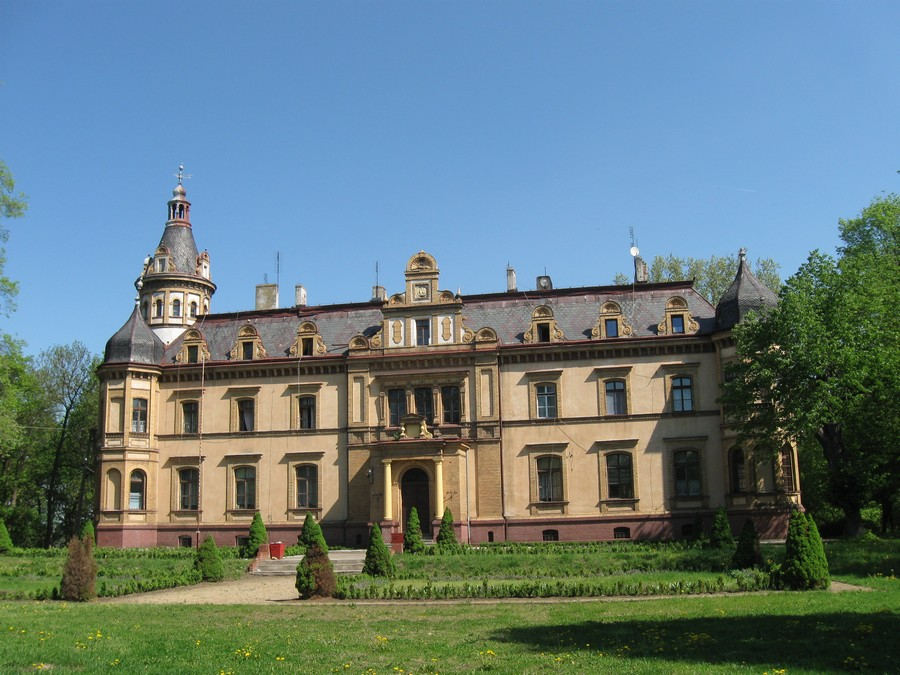
- Palace in Góra

- Location within Poland
- Coordinates: 51°58′N 17°21′E
- Country: Poland
- Voivodeship: Greater Poland
- County: Jarocin
- Gmina: Jaraczewo

Góra [ˈɡura] is a village in the administrative district of Gmina Jaraczewo, within Jarocin County, Greater Poland Voivodeship, in west-central Poland.
