= Antonin, Jarocin County =

Antonin
- Village
- Location within Poland
- Coordinates: 52°7′N 17°37′E
- Country: Poland
- Voivodeship: Greater Poland
- County: Jarocin
- Gmina: Żerków
- Population: 180

Antonin (Polish pronunciation: [anˈtɔɲin]) is a village in the administrative district of Gmina Żerków, within Jarocin County, Greater Poland Voivodeship, in west-central Poland.
