= Chwałów =

Chwałów may refer to the following places in Poland:

- Chwałów, Lower Silesian Voivodeship (south-west Poland)
- Chwałów, Greater Poland Voivodeship (west-central Poland)
