= Wysogotówek =

- Village
- Location within Poland
- Coordinates: 51°58′N 17°37′E
- Country: Poland
- Voivodeship: Greater Poland
- County: Jarocin
- Gmina: Kotlin

Wysogotówek [vɨsɔɡɔˈtuvɛk] is a village in the administrative district of Gmina Kotlin, within Jarocin County, Greater Poland Voivodeship, in west-central Poland. The German name for this town was Hochdorf during the Third Reich occupation and under the Kingdom of Prussia during most of the 19th century. A planned renaming to Weißkotten under Third Reich rule was not executed due to the end of WWII.
