= Bielejewo =

Bielejewo refers to the following places in Poland:

- Bielejewo, Jarocin County
- Bielejewo, Szamotuły County
