= Wojciechowo, Jarocin County =

Wojciechowo
- Village
- Location within Poland
- Coordinates: 51°57′N 17°18′E
- Country: Poland
- Voivodeship: Greater Poland
- County: Jarocin
- Gmina: Jaraczewo

Wojciechowo (Polish: [vɔjt͡ɕɛˈxɔvɔ]) is a village in the administrative district of Gmina Jaraczewo, within Jarocin County, Greater Poland Voivodeship, in west-central Poland.
