= Parzewnia =

- Settlement
- Location within Poland
- Coordinates: 52°2′11″N 17°32′40″E
- Country: Poland
- Voivodeship: Greater Poland
- County: Jarocin
- Gmina: Żerków

Parzewnia [paˈʐɛvɲa] is a settlement in the administrative district of Gmina Żerków, within Jarocin County, Greater Poland Voivodeship, in west-central Poland.
