= Niedźwiady, Jarocin County =

Niedźwiady
- Village
- Location within Poland
- Coordinates: 51°58′41″N 17°13′08″E
- Country: Poland
- Voivodeship: Greater Poland
- County: Jarocin
- Gmina: Jaraczewo

Niedźwiady [ɲɛd͡ʑˈvjadɨ] (German: Ulrikenhof, until 1907: Niedzwiady) is a village in the administrative district of Gmina Jaraczewo, within Jarocin County, Greater Poland Voivodeship, in west-central Poland.
