= Miniszew =

- Village
- Location within Poland
- Coordinates: 52°2′42″N 17°41′26″E
- Country: Poland
- Voivodeship: Greater Poland
- County: Jarocin
- Gmina: Żerków

Miniszew [miˈniʂɛf] is a village in the administrative district of Gmina Żerków, within Jarocin County, Greater Poland Voivodeship, in west-central Poland.
