= Poręba, Greater Poland Voivodeship =

Poręba
- Village
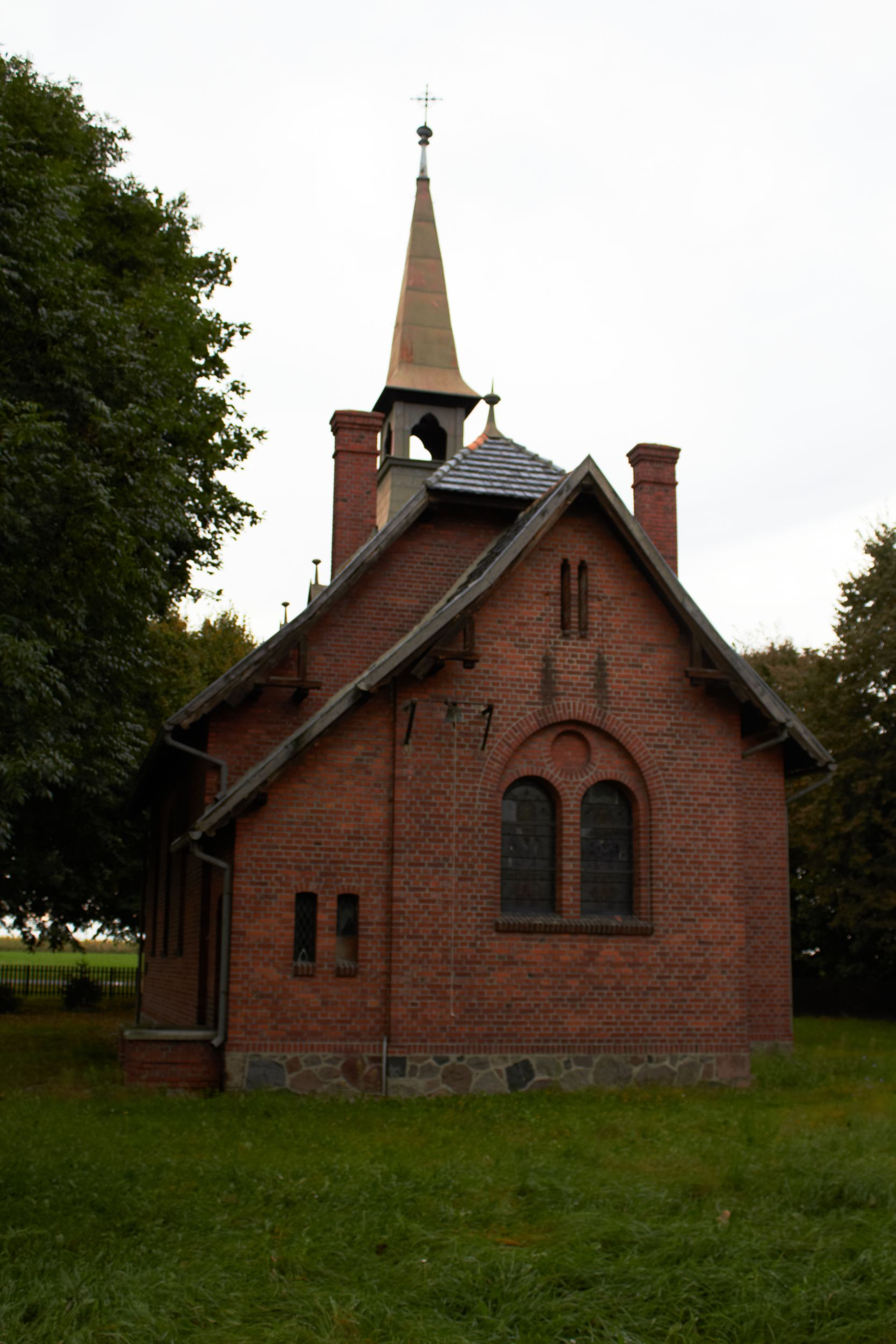
- Poręba evangelical church

- Location within Poland
- Coordinates: 51°55′43″N 17°19′07″E
- Country: Poland
- Voivodeship: Greater Poland
- County: Jarocin
- Gmina: Jaraczewo

Poręba [pɔˈrɛmba] is a village in the administrative district of Gmina Jaraczewo, within Jarocin County, Greater Poland Voivodeship, in west-central Poland.
