= Wyszki =

Wyszki may refer to the following places in Poland:

- Wyszki, Lower Silesian Voivodeship (south-west Poland)
- Wyszki, Podlaskie Voivodeship (north-east Poland)
- Wyszki, Greater Poland Voivodeship (west-central Poland)
