= Kurcew =

- Village
- Location within Poland
- Coordinates: 51°56′N 17°43′E
- Country: Poland
- Voivodeship: Greater Poland
- County: Jarocin
- Gmina: Kotlin

Kurcew [ˈkurt͡sɛf] is a village in the administrative district of Gmina Kotlin, within Jarocin County, Greater Poland Voivodeship, in west-central Poland.
