= Panienka =

- Village
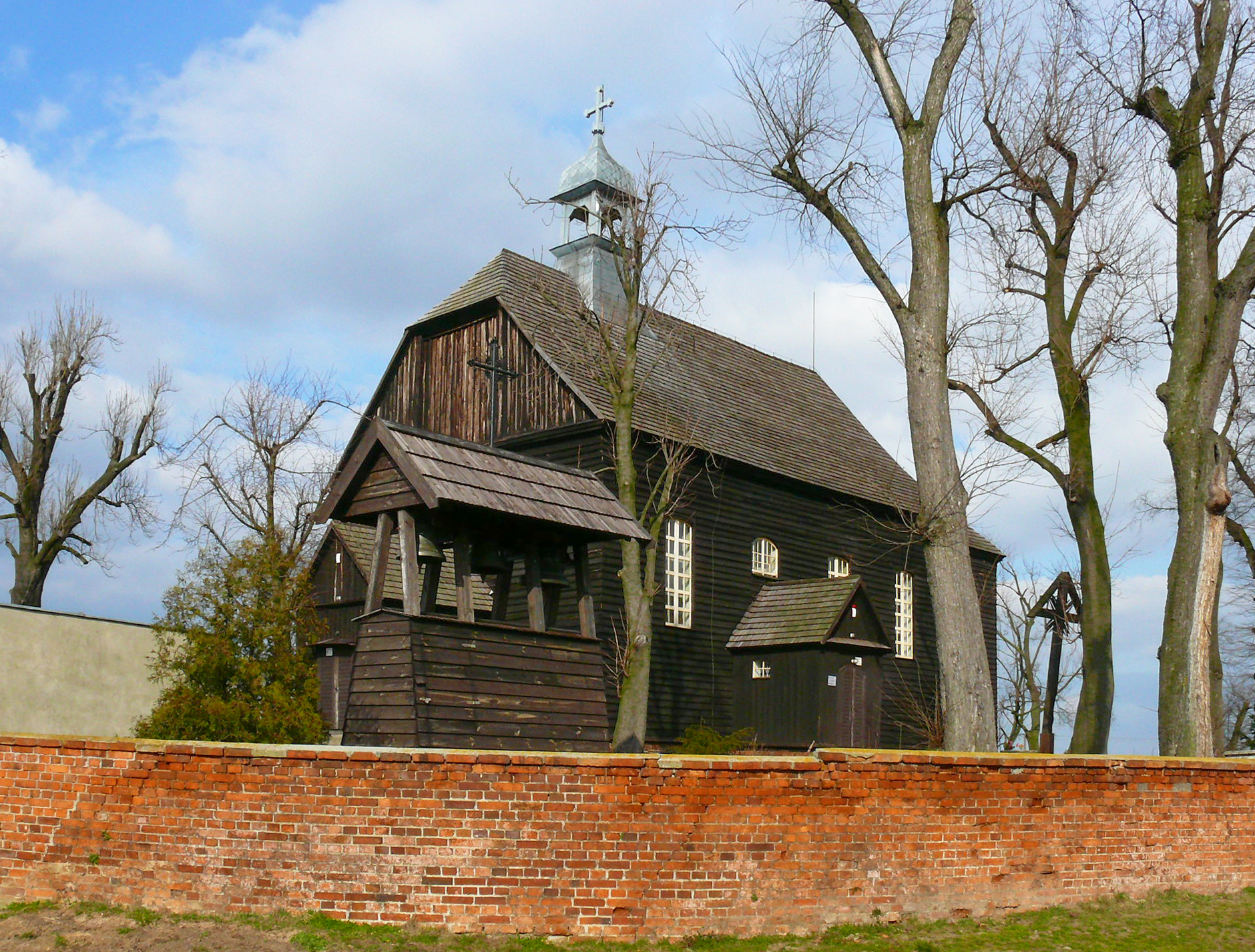
- Church of Jesus

- Location within Poland
- Coordinates: 51°59′N 17°21′E
- Country: Poland
- Voivodeship: Greater Poland
- County: Jarocin
- Gmina: Jaraczewo
- Elevation: 98 m (322 ft)

Panienka [paˈɲɛnka] is a village in the administrative district of Gmina Jaraczewo, within Jarocin County, Greater Poland Voivodeship, in west-central Poland.

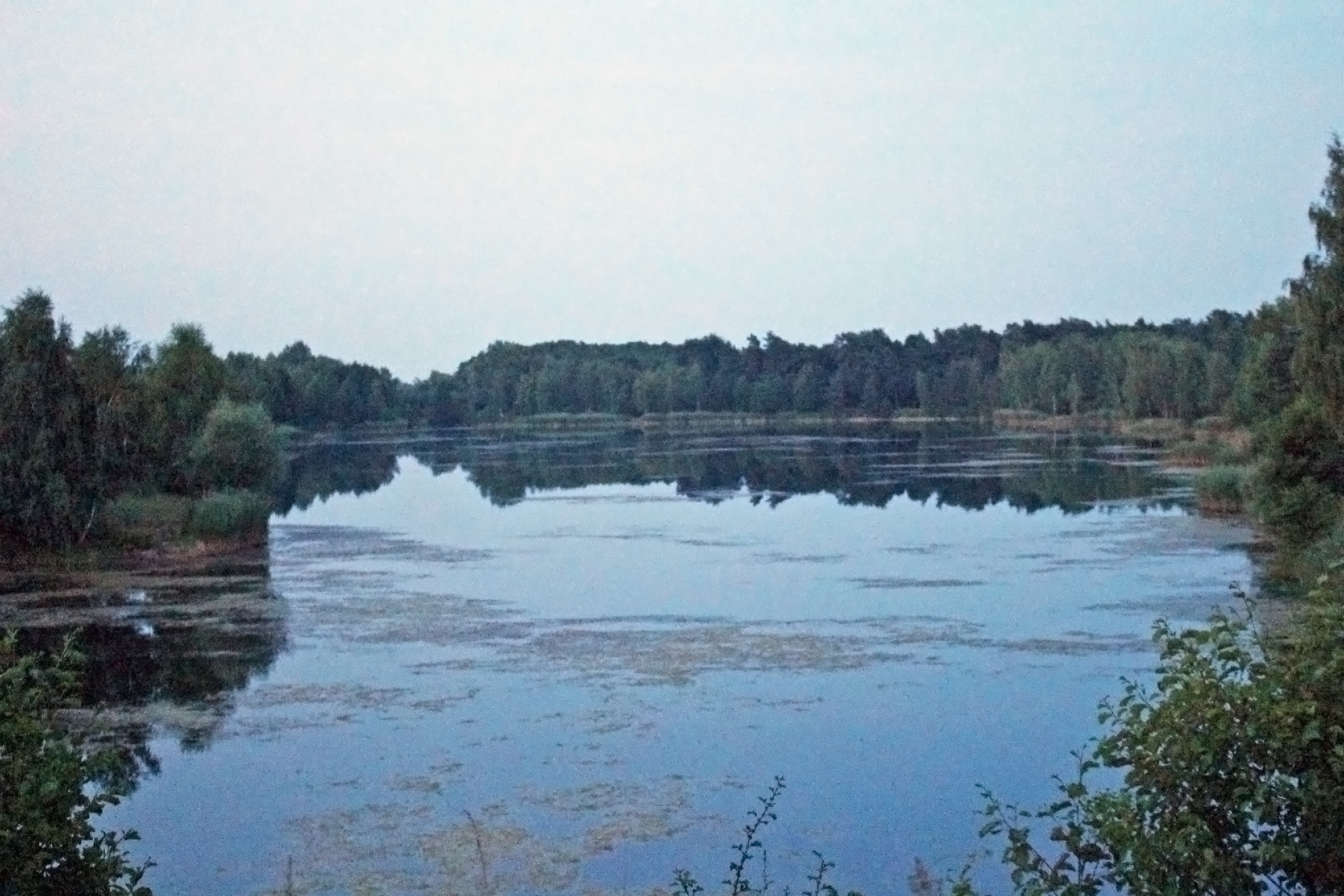

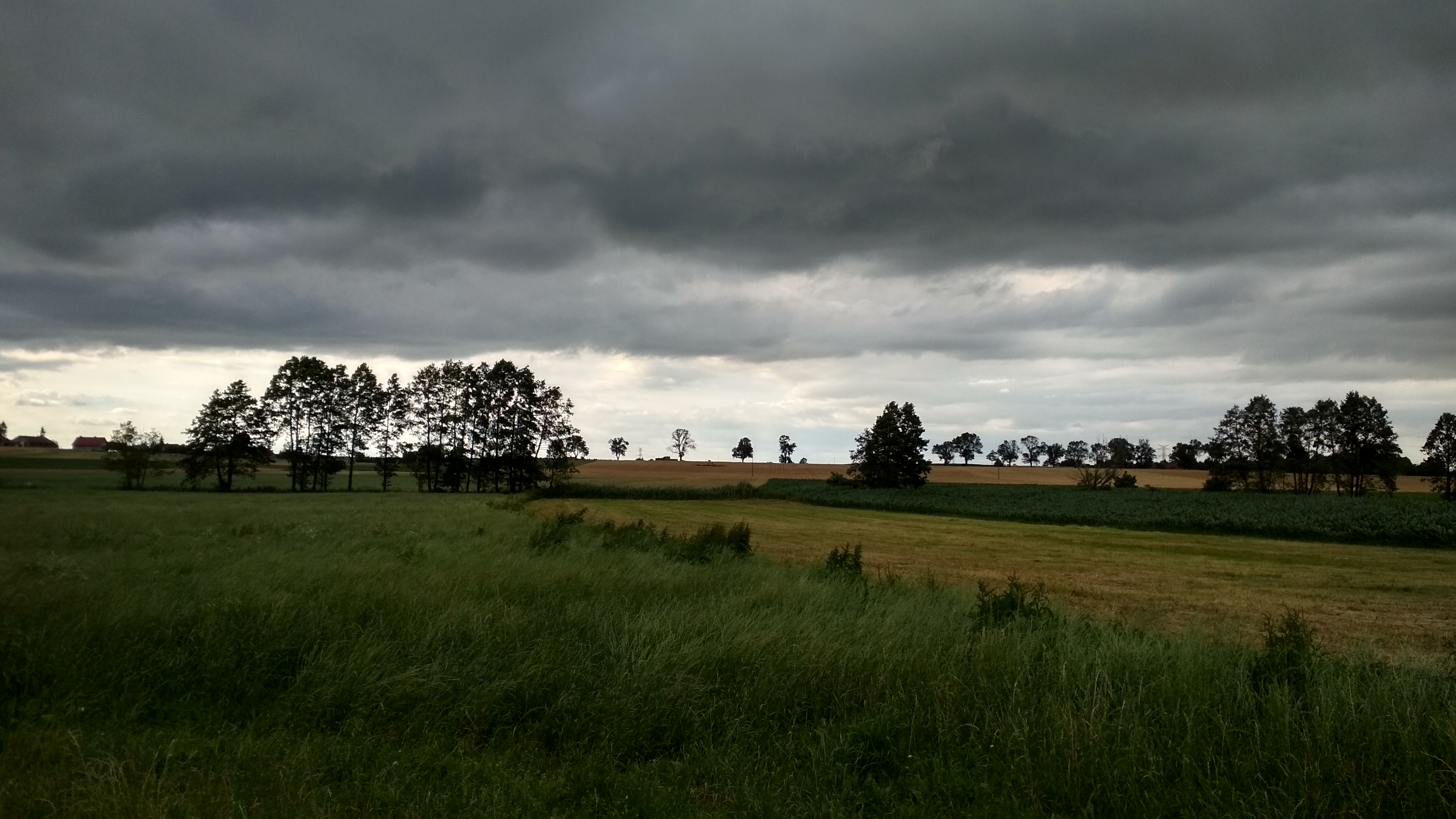

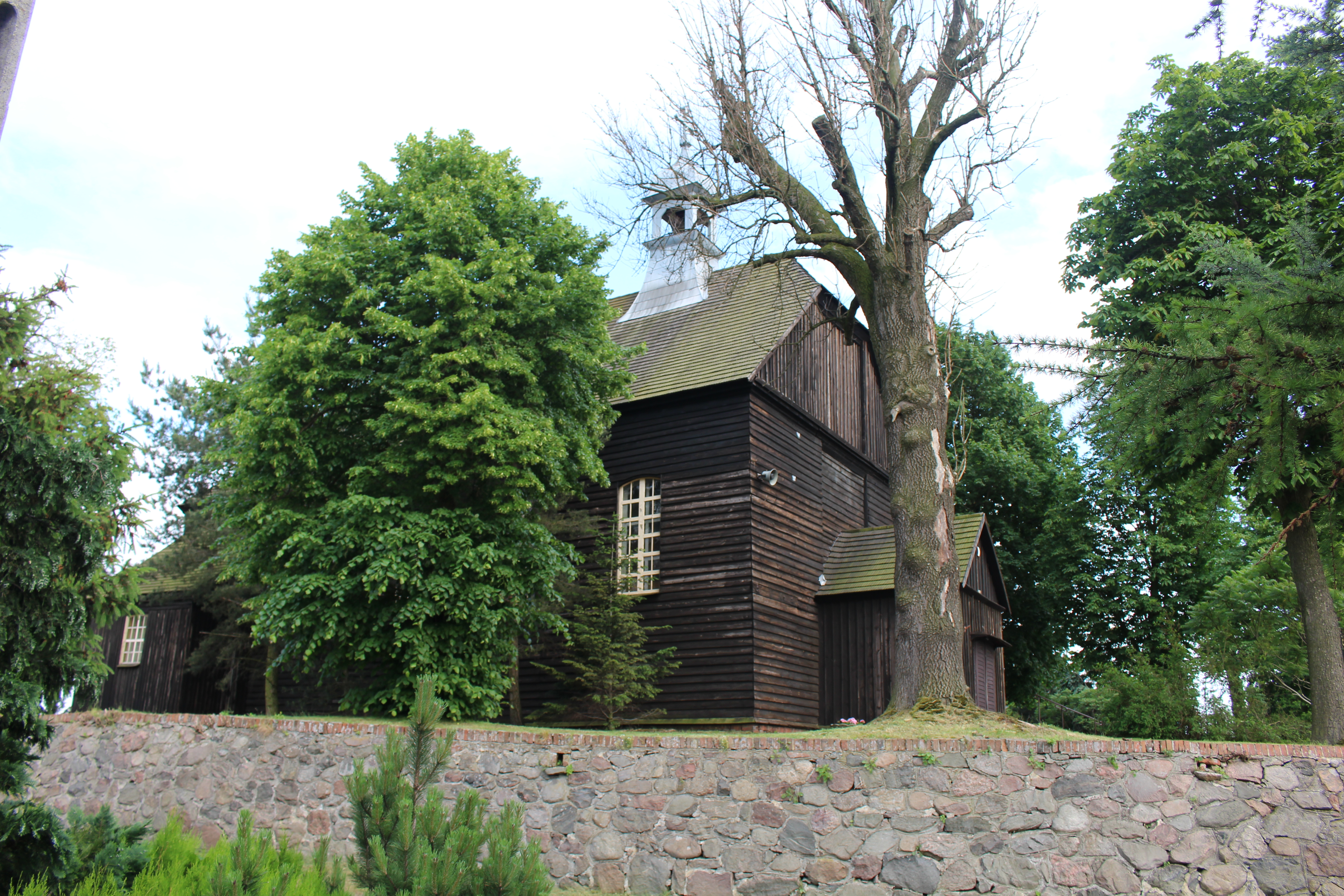

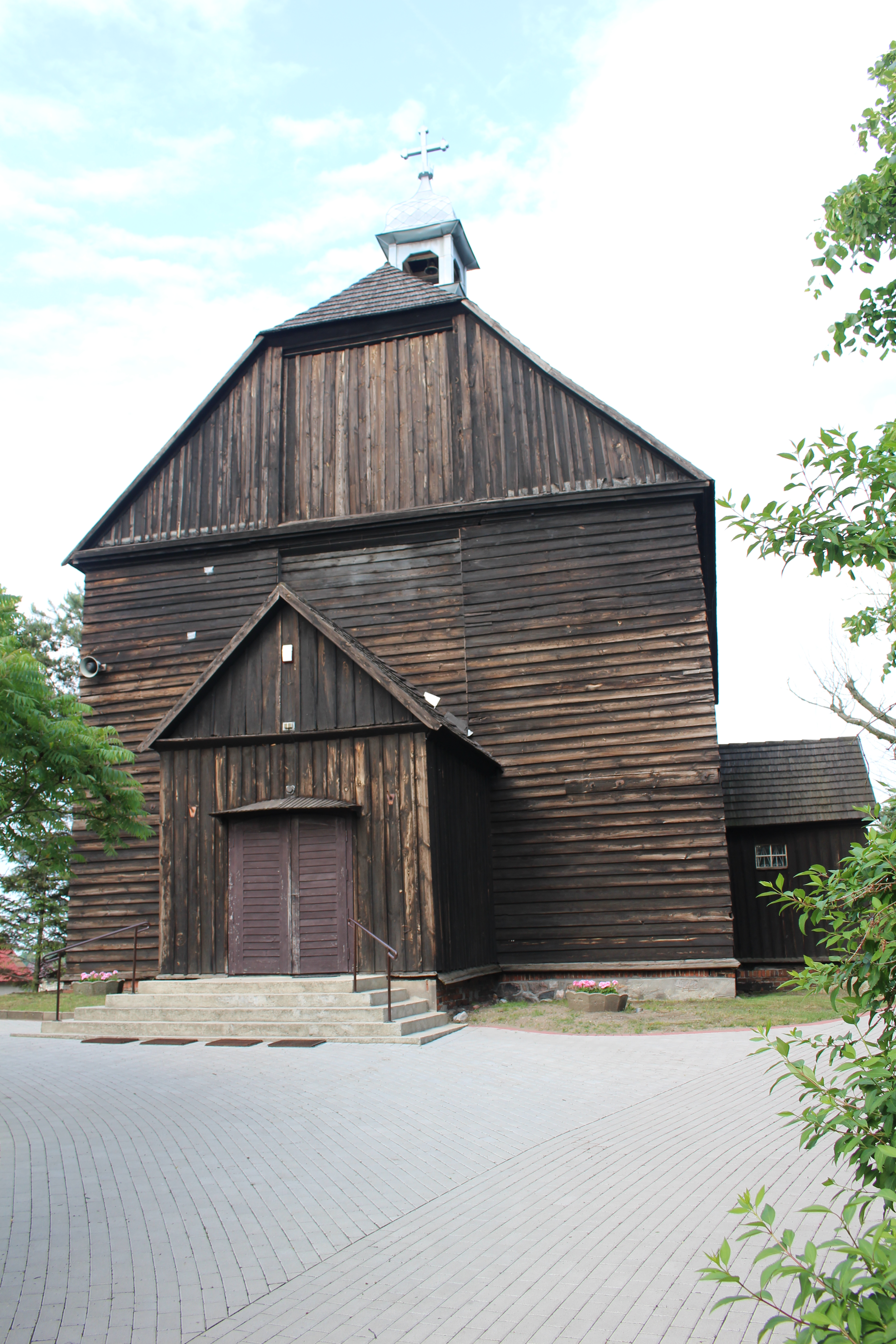
