= Nosków, Greater Poland Voivodeship =

Nosków
- Village
- Location within Poland
- Coordinates: 51°56′N 17°24′E
- Country: Poland
- Voivodeship: Greater Poland
- County: Jarocin
- Gmina: Jaraczewo
- Population: 960

Nosków [ˈnɔskuf] is a village in the administrative district of Gmina Jaraczewo, within Jarocin County, Greater Poland Voivodeship, in west-central Poland.
