= Siekierzyn, Jarocin County =

Siekierzyn
- Settlement
- Location within Poland
- Coordinates: 52°5′37″N 17°38′15″E
- Country: Poland
- Voivodeship: Greater Poland
- County: Jarocin
- Gmina: Żerków

Siekierzyn [ɕɛˈkʲɛʐɨn] is a settlement in the administrative district of Gmina Żerków, within Jarocin County, Greater Poland Voivodeship, in west-central Poland.
