= Łowęcice =

Łowęcice may refer to the following places in Poland:

- Łowęcice, Lower Silesian Voivodeship (south-west Poland)
- Łowęcice, Greater Poland Voivodeship (west-central Poland)
