= Elżbietów =

Elżbietów may refer to the following places:

- Elżbietów, Lublin Voivodeship (east Poland)
- Elżbietów, Garwolin County in Masovian Voivodeship (east-central Poland)
- Elżbietów, Sochaczew County in Masovian Voivodeship (east-central Poland)
- Elżbietów, Kalisz County in Greater Poland Voivodeship (west-central Poland)
- Elżbietów, Gmina Nowe Miasto nad Wartą, Środa County in Greater Poland Voivodeship (west-central Poland)
