= Paruchów =

- Village
- Location within Poland
- Coordinates: 52°7′29″N 17°36′42″E
- Country: Poland
- Voivodeship: Greater Poland
- County: Jarocin
- Gmina: Żerków

Paruchów [paˈruxuf] is a village in the administrative district of Gmina Żerków, within Jarocin County, Greater Poland Voivodeship, in west-central Poland.
