= Ludwinów, Greater Poland Voivodeship =

Ludwinów
- Village
- Location within Poland
- Coordinates: 52°2′53″N 17°37′12″E
- Country: Poland
- Voivodeship: Greater Poland
- County: Jarocin
- Gmina: Żerków

Ludwinów [ludˈvinuf] is a village in the administrative district of Gmina Żerków, within Jarocin County, Greater Poland Voivodeship, in west-central Poland.
