= Kretków =

- Village
- Location within Poland
- Coordinates: 52°4′29″N 17°39′48″E
- Country: Poland
- Voivodeship: Greater Poland
- County: Jarocin
- Gmina: Żerków
- Population: 170

Kretków [ˈkrɛtkuf] is a village in the administrative district of Gmina Żerków, within Jarocin County, Greater Poland Voivodeship, in west-central Poland.

In 1891 owner of Kretków was Hipolit Drogosław Skórzewski.
