= Kamień, Jarocin County =

Kamień
- Village
- Location within Poland
- Coordinates: 52°2′24″N 17°38′18″E
- Country: Poland
- Voivodeship: Greater Poland
- County: Jarocin
- Gmina: Żerków
- Population: 160

Kamień (Polish pronunciation: [ˈkamjɛj̃]) is a village in the administrative district of Gmina Żerków, within Jarocin County, Greater Poland Voivodeship, in west-central Poland.
