= Wilcza (disambiguation) =

Wilcza is the name of a street in Warsaw.

Wilcza may also refer to the following villages in Poland:

- Wilcza, Lower Silesian Voivodeship (south-west Poland)
- Wilcza, Silesian Voivodeship (south Poland)
- Wilcza, Greater Poland Voivodeship (west-central Poland)
