= Laski, Jarocin County =

Laski
- Settlement
- Location within Poland
- Coordinates: 52°3′57″N 17°31′41″E
- Country: Poland
- Voivodeship: Greater Poland
- County: Jarocin
- Gmina: Żerków

Laski (Polish pronunciation: [ˈlaskʲi]) is a settlement in the administrative district of Gmina Żerków, within Jarocin County, Greater Poland Voivodeship, in west-central Poland.
