= Pogorzelica, Greater Poland Voivodeship =

Pogorzelica
- Settlement
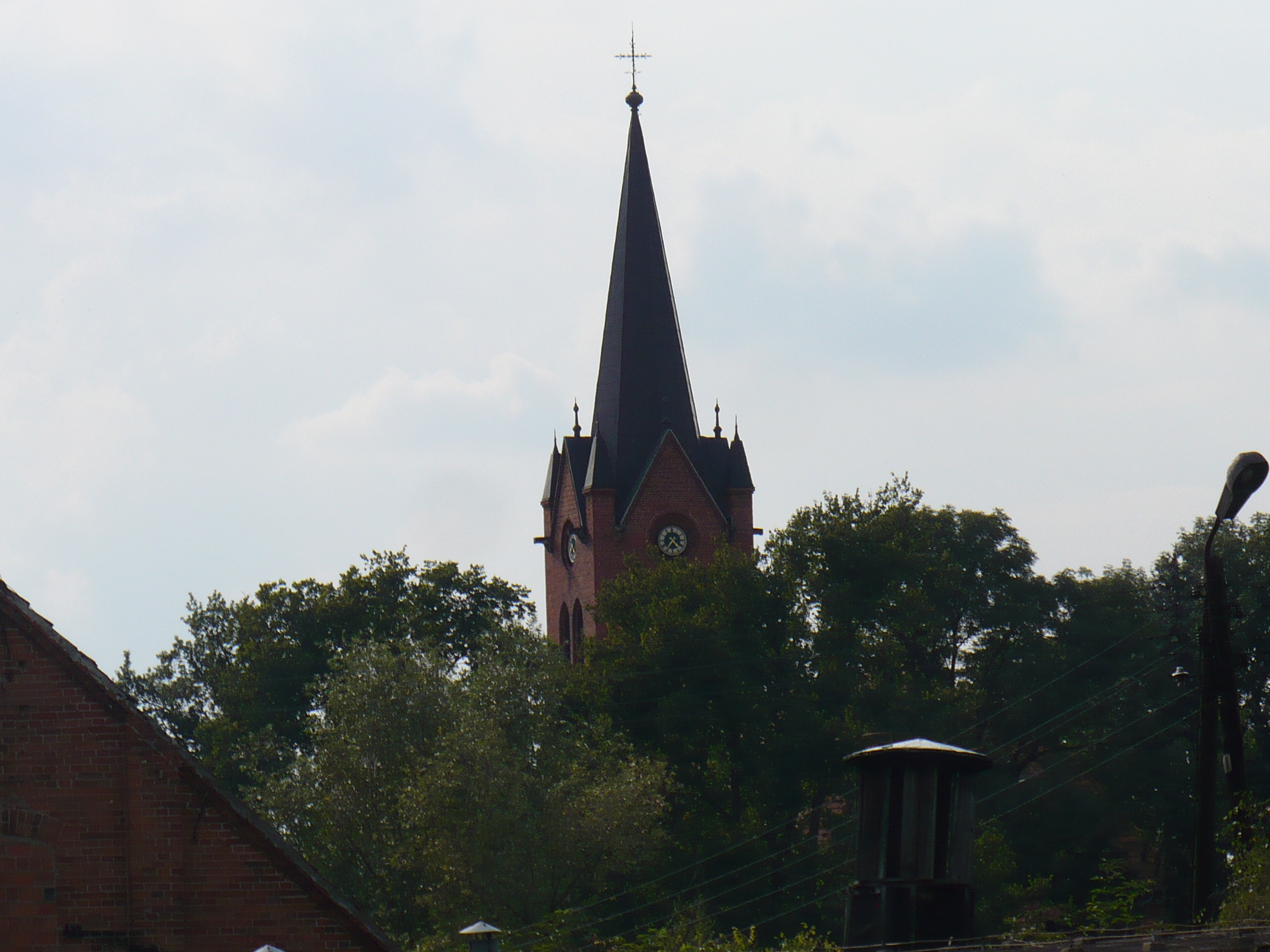
- Saint Adalbert and Mater Ecclesiae church in Pogorzelica

- Location within Poland
- Coordinates: 52°8′12″N 17°35′29″E
- Country: Poland
- Voivodeship: Greater Poland
- County: Jarocin
- Gmina: Żerków
- Time zone: UTC+1 (CET)
  - Summer (DST): UTC+2 (CEST)
- Vehicle registration: PJA

Pogorzelica [pɔɡɔʐɛˈlit͡sa] is a settlement in the administrative district of Gmina Żerków, within Jarocin County, Greater Poland Voivodeship, in west-central Poland. It is located in the historic region of Greater Poland.

== History ==
As part of the region of Greater Poland, i.e. the cradle of the Polish state, the area formed part of Poland since its establishment in the 10th century. It was annexed by Prussia in the Second Partition of Poland in 1793. It was regained by Poles in 1807 and included within the short-lived Duchy of Warsaw, and after the duchy's dissolution in 1815, the village was reannexed by Prussia, and was also part of Germany from 1871. Following World War I, Poland regained independence and control of the village. During World War II, the village was occupied by Germany from 1939 to 1945.
