= Nowa Cerekwica =

- Village
- Location within Poland
- Coordinates: 51°56′N 17°20′E
- Country: Poland
- Voivodeship: Greater Poland
- County: Jarocin
- Gmina: Jaraczewo
- Population: 260

Nowa Cerekwica [ˈnɔva t͡sɛrɛkˈfit͡sa] is a village in the administrative district of Gmina Jaraczewo, within Jarocin County, Greater Poland Voivodeship, in west-central Poland.
