= Łukaszewo, Greater Poland Voivodeship =

Łukaszewo
- Village
- Location within Poland
- Coordinates: 51°57′32″N 17°16′29″E
- Country: Poland
- Voivodeship: Greater Poland
- County: Jarocin
- Gmina: Jaraczewo

Łukaszewo [wukaˈʂɛvɔ] is a village in the administrative district of Gmina Jaraczewo, within Jarocin County, Greater Poland Voivodeship, in west-central Poland.
