= Gęczew =

- Settlement
- Location within Poland
- Coordinates: 52°6′16″N 17°32′55″E
- Country: Poland
- Voivodeship: Greater Poland
- County: Jarocin
- Gmina: Żerków

Gęczew [ˈɡɛnt͡ʂɛf] is a settlement in the administrative district of Gmina Żerków, within Jarocin County, Greater Poland Voivodeship, in west-central Poland.
