= Lgów =

- Village
- Location within Poland
- Coordinates: 52°06′18″N 17°32′07″E
- Country: Poland
- Voivodeship: Greater Poland
- County: Jarocin
- Gmina: Żerków
- Population (approx.): 180

Lgów [lɡuf] is a village in the administrative district of Gmina Żerków, within Jarocin County, Greater Poland Voivodeship, in west-central Poland.

The village has an approximate population of 180.

== History ==
The History of Lgów is estimated to date back to early fourteenth century. The first church named Nativity of the Blessed Virgin Mary was founded in the seventeenth century by one of the most powerful medieval families coming from Kujaw, but was later incorporated into Debno due to low income and little number of the faithful.
