= Chrzan, Greater Poland Voivodeship =

Chrzan
- Village
- Location within Poland
- Coordinates: 52°4′10″N 17°30′25″E
- Country: Poland
- Voivodeship: Greater Poland
- County: Jarocin
- Gmina: Żerków
- Population: 1,200

Chrzan [xʂan] is a village in the administrative district of Gmina Żerków, within Jarocin County, Greater Poland Voivodeship, in west-central Poland.
