= Prusinów =

- Village
- Location within Poland
- Coordinates: 52°2′9″N 17°41′55″E
- Country: Poland
- Voivodeship: Greater Poland
- County: Jarocin
- Gmina: Żerków
- Population: 180

Prusinów [pruˈɕinuf] is a village in the administrative district of Gmina Żerków, within Jarocin County, Greater Poland Voivodeship, in west-central Poland.
