= Podlesie, Jarocin County =

Podlesie
- Settlement
- Location within Poland
- Coordinates: 52°4′9″N 17°37′9″E
- Country: Poland
- Voivodeship: Greater Poland
- County: Jarocin
- Gmina: Żerków

Podlesie [pɔdˈlɛɕɛ] is a settlement in the administrative district of Gmina Żerków, within Jarocin County, Greater Poland Voivodeship, in west-central Poland.
