= Komorze Przybysławskie =

- Village
- Location within Poland
- Coordinates: 52°6′29″N 17°38′45″E
- Country: Poland
- Voivodeship: Greater Poland
- County: Jarocin
- Gmina: Żerków

Komorze Przybysławskie [kɔˈmɔʐɛ pʂɨbɨˈswafskʲɛ] is a village in the administrative district of Gmina Żerków, within Jarocin County, Greater Poland Voivodeship, in west-central Poland.
