= Kotlin (disambiguation) =

Kotlin is a general-purpose programming language.

Kotlin may also refer to:

- Kotlin, Greater Poland Voivodeship, a village in west-central Poland
- Kotlin Island, a Russian island near the head of the Gulf of Finland
- Kotlin-class destroyer, a class of destroyers built for the Soviet Navy
- Kotlin, a brand of fruit and vegetable products made by Agros Nova, a Polish company
