= Wola Książęca =

- Village
- Location within Poland
- Coordinates: 51°58′N 17°35′E
- Country: Poland
- Voivodeship: Greater Poland
- County: Jarocin
- Gmina: Kotlin
- Population (approx.): 800

Wola Książęca [ˈvɔla kɕɔ̃ˈʐɛnt͡sa] is a village in the administrative district of Gmina Kotlin, within Jarocin County, Greater Poland Voivodeship, in west-central Poland.

The village has an approximate population of 800.
