= Żerniki, Jarocin County =

Żerniki
- Village
- Location within Poland
- Coordinates: 52°3′57″N 17°40′25″E
- Country: Poland
- Voivodeship: Greater Poland
- County: Jarocin
- Gmina: Żerków

Żerniki (Polish pronunciation: [ʐɛrˈɲikʲi]) is a village in the administrative district of Gmina Żerków, within Jarocin County, Greater Poland Voivodeship, in west-central Poland.
