= Chromiec =

Chromiec may refer to the following places in Poland:

- Chromiec, Lower Silesian Voivodeship (south-west Poland)
- Chromiec, Greater Poland Voivodeship (west-central Poland)
