= Pawłowice, Jarocin County =

Pawłowice
- Village
- Location within Poland
- Coordinates: 52°3′8″N 17°32′19″E
- Country: Poland
- Voivodeship: Greater Poland
- County: Jarocin
- Gmina: Żerków

Pawłowice [pavwɔˈvit͡sɛ] is a village in the administrative district of Gmina Żerków, within Jarocin County, Greater Poland Voivodeship, in west-central Poland.
