= Gola, Jarocin County =

Gola
- Village
- Location within Poland
- Coordinates: 51°58′24″N 17°15′35″E
- Country: Poland
- Voivodeship: Greater Poland
- County: Jarocin
- Gmina: Jaraczewo

Gola [ˈɡɔla] is a village in the administrative district of Gmina Jaraczewo, within Jarocin County, Greater Poland Voivodeship, in west-central Poland.
