= Petr Brandl =

Czech painter and portrait painter

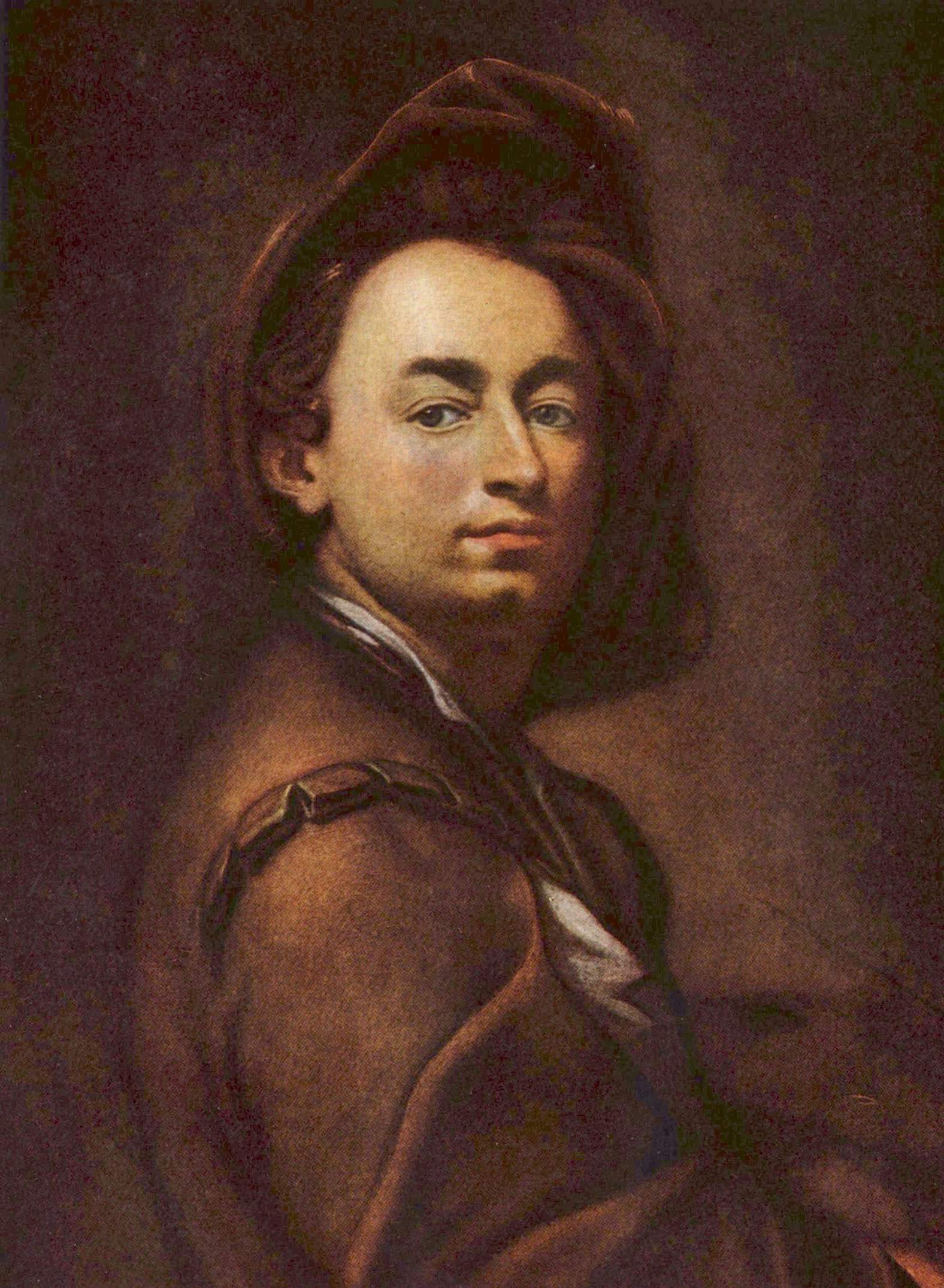
- Self-portrait of Petr Brandl, 1700
- Born: Petr Jan Brandl; 24 October 1668; Prague, Kingdom of Bohemia, Habsburg monarchy
- Died: 24 September 1735 (aged 66); Kutná Hora, Kingdom of Bohemia, Habsburg monarchy
- Known for: Painting
- Notable work: Simeon s Ježíškem (Simeon with the Infant Jesus)
- Movement: Baroque

Petr Brandl (Peter Johannes Brandl or Jan Petr Brandl) (24 October 1668 – 24 September 1735) was a Czech painter of the late Baroque in the bilingual Kingdom of Bohemia. Brandl was the sixth child in a Czech-German family. His father, Michal Brandl, worked as a tailor and was of German ancestry. His mother, Alžběta Hrbková, was Czech from a peasant family in the south Bohemian village of Přestanice (now part of Hlavňovice).

Brandl was famous in his time but – due to isolation behind the Iron Curtain – rather forgotten until recently. Brandl employed strong chiaroscuro, areas of heavy impasto and very plastic as well as dramatic figures.

According to the Grove Dictionary of Art and other sources, Brandl was apprenticed around 1683–1688 to Kristián Schröder (1655–1702).

The National Gallery in Prague, has an entire hall devoted to the artist's works, including "Bust of an Apostle" from some time before 1725.

The artist is a distant ancestor of both contemporary Austrian painter Herbert Brandl and contemporary American-Swiss painter Mark Staff Brandl.

== Gallery ==
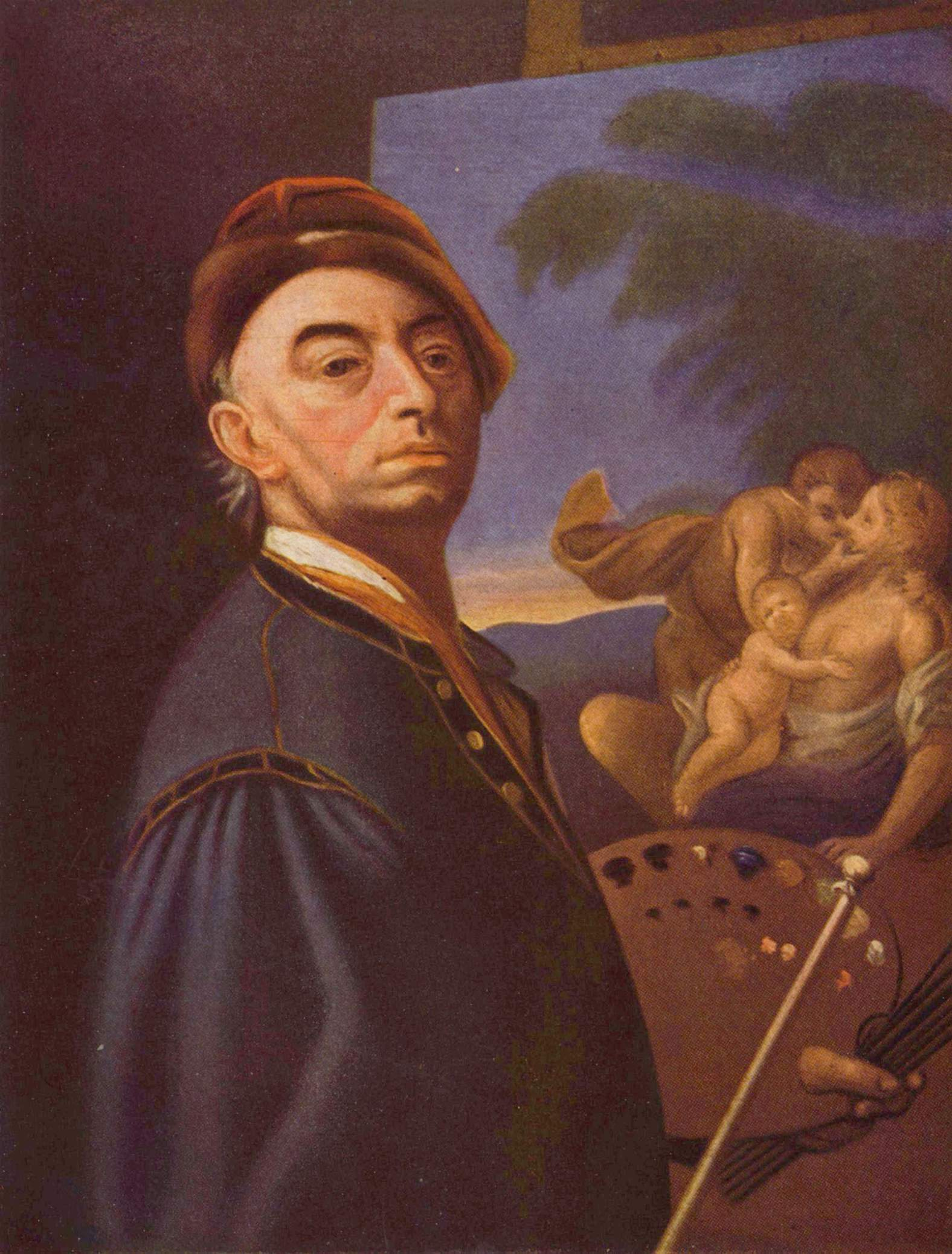
Portrait of Peter Brandl, c. 1720

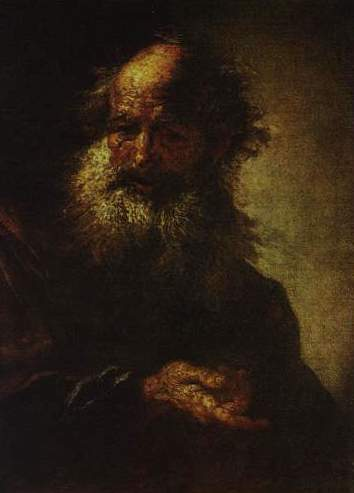
Apostle

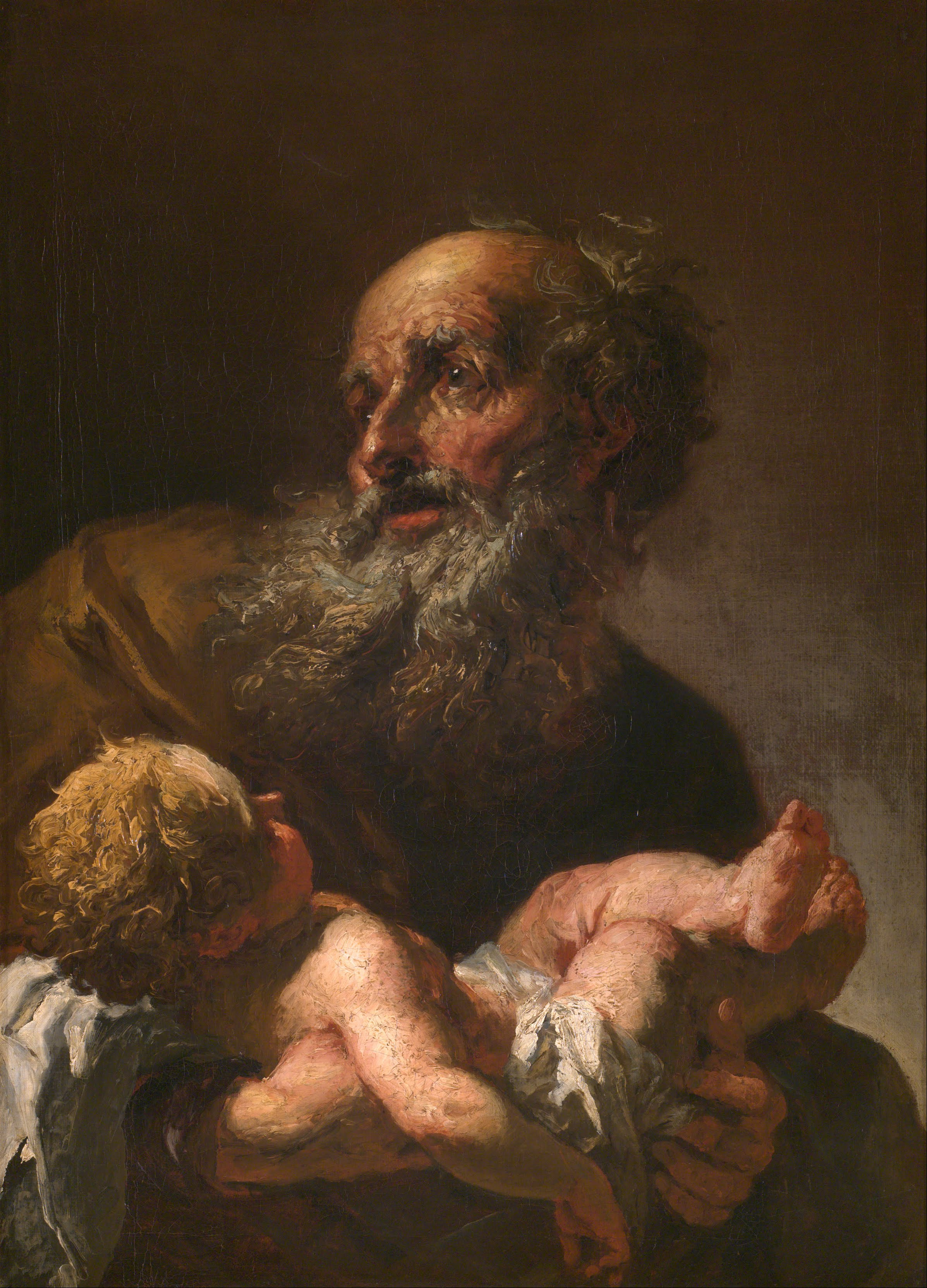
Simeon with the Infant Jesus, after 1725

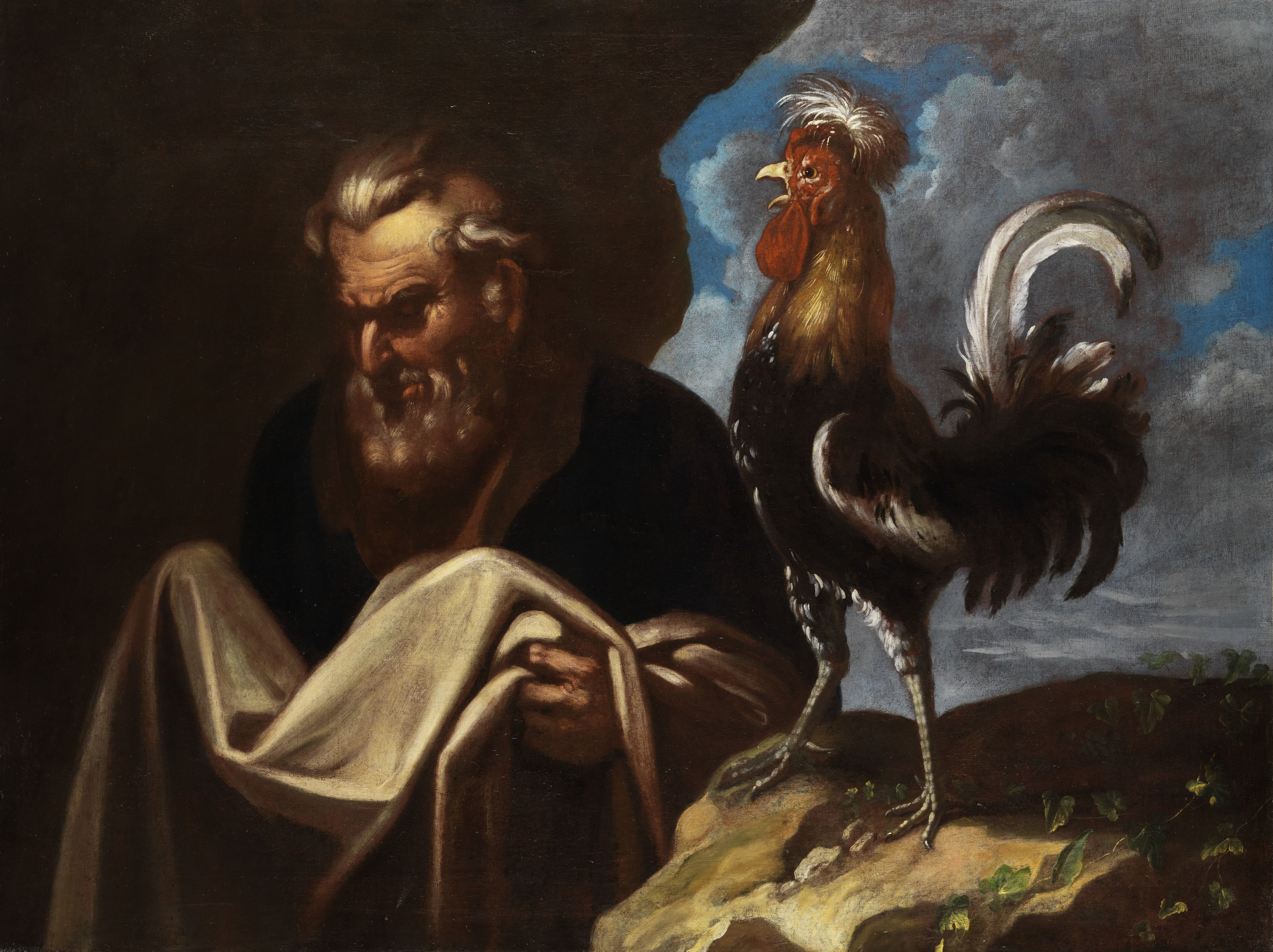
St. Peter's cock
(Attributed to Brandl)

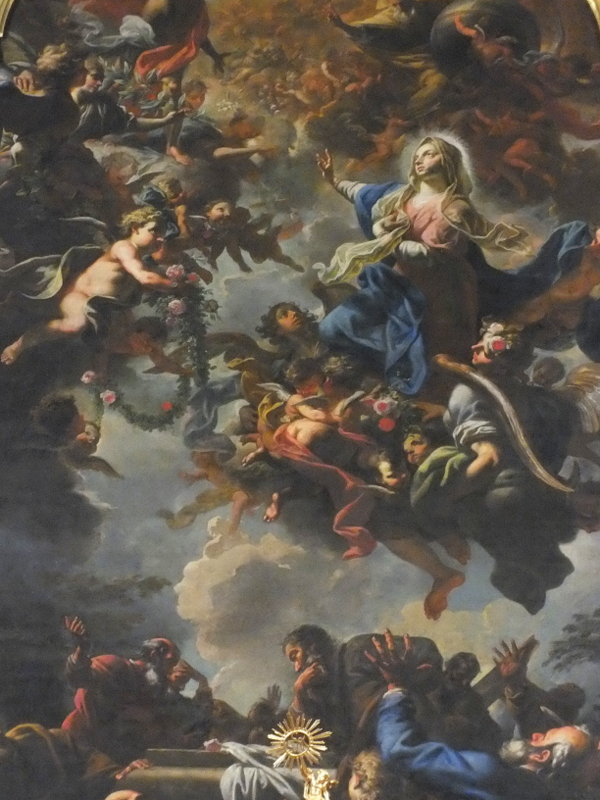
Assumption of Mary
