= Łobez, Greater Poland Voivodeship =

Łobez
- Village
- Location within Poland
- Coordinates: 51°58′N 17°20′E
- Country: Poland
- Voivodeship: Greater Poland
- County: Jarocin
- Gmina: Jaraczewo
- Population (approx.): 150

Łobez [ˈwɔbɛs] is a village in the administrative district of Gmina Jaraczewo, within Jarocin County, Greater Poland Voivodeship, in west-central Poland.

The village has an approximate population of 150.
