= Rogaszyce, Jarocin County =

Rogaszyce
- Village
- Location within Poland
- Coordinates: 52°4′46″N 17°38′13″E
- Country: Poland
- Voivodeship: Greater Poland
- County: Jarocin
- Gmina: Żerków

Rogaszyce [rɔɡaˈʂɨt͡sɛ] is a village in the administrative district of Gmina Żerków, within Jarocin County, Greater Poland Voivodeship, in west-central Poland.
