= Łobzowiec =

- Village
- Location within Poland
- Coordinates: 51°57′N 17°21′E
- Country: Poland
- Voivodeship: Greater Poland
- County: Jarocin
- Gmina: Jaraczewo

Łobzowiec [wɔbˈzɔvjɛt͡s] (German: Niederdorf) is a village in the administrative district of Gmina Jaraczewo, within Jarocin County, Greater Poland Voivodeship, in west-central Poland.
