= Cerekwica Stara =

Cerekwica
- Village
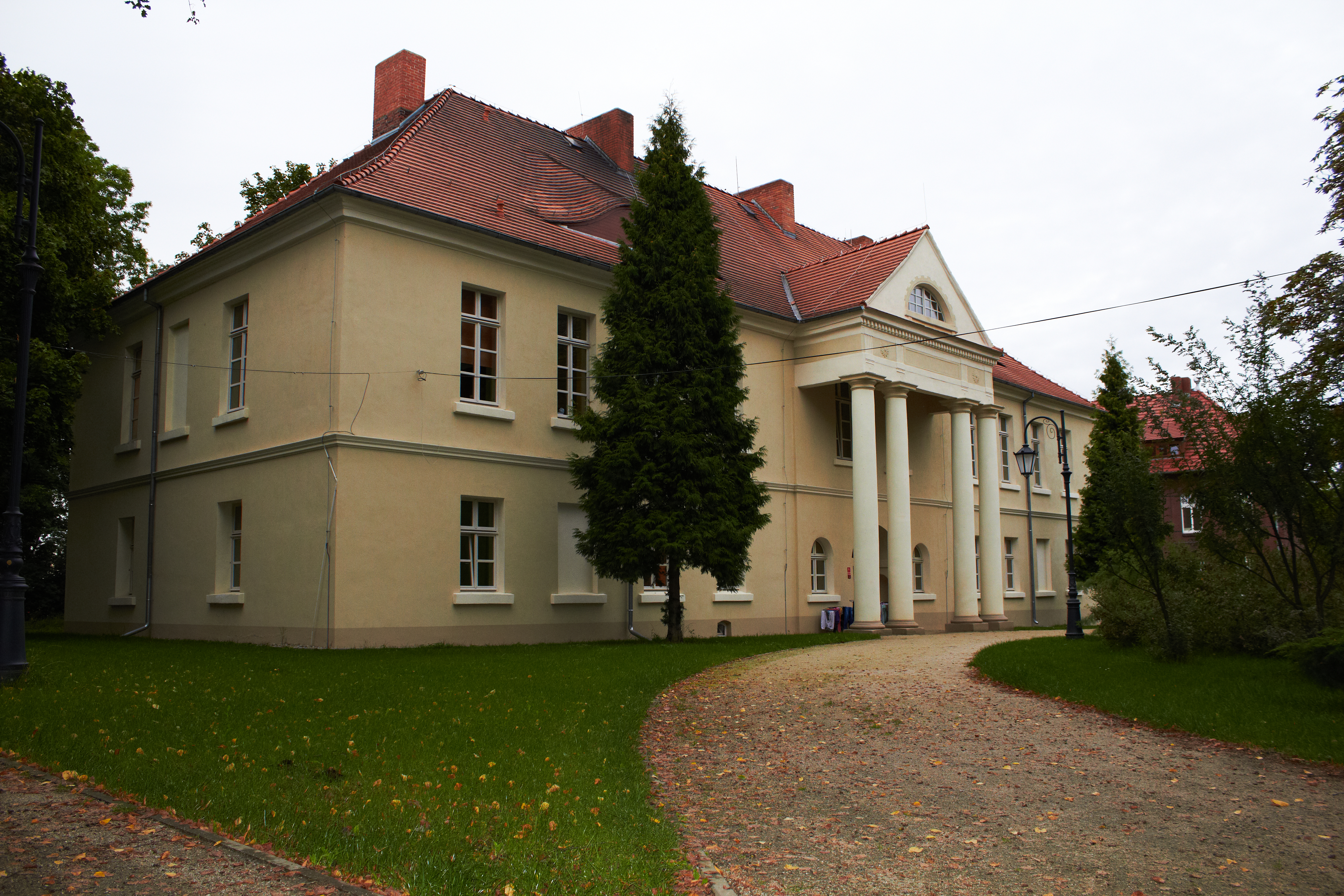
- Manor in the village

- Location within Poland
- Coordinates: 51°55′N 17°21′E
- Country: Poland
- Voivodeship: Greater Poland
- County: Jarocin
- Gmina: Jaraczewo

Population
  - Total: 230

Cerekwica [t͡sɛrɛkˈfit͡sa] is a village in the administrative district of Gmina Jaraczewo, within Jarocin County, Greater Poland Voivodeship, in west-central Poland.
