= Łowęcice, Greater Poland Voivodeship =

Łowęcice
- Village
- Location within Poland
- Coordinates: 51°56′N 17°18′E
- Country: Poland
- Voivodeship: Greater Poland
- County: Jarocin
- Gmina: Jaraczewo

Łowęcice [wɔvɛnˈt͡ɕit͡sɛ] is a village in the administrative district of Gmina Jaraczewo, within Jarocin County, Greater Poland Voivodeship, in west-central Poland.
