= Komorze Nowe =

- Village
- Location within Poland
- Coordinates: 52°4′43″N 17°23′8″E
- Country: Poland
- Voivodeship: Greater Poland
- County: Środa
- Gmina: Nowe Miasto nad Wartą

Komorze Nowe [kɔˈmɔʐɛ ˈnɔvɛ] is a village in the administrative district of Gmina Nowe Miasto nad Wartą, within Środa County, Greater Poland Voivodeship, in west-central Poland.
