= Gmina Żerków =

Gmina Żerków Żerków Commune
- Gmina
- Flag Coat of arms
- Interactive map of Gmina Żerków
- Coordinates (Żerków): 52°4′N 17°34′E
- Country: Poland
- Voivodeship: Greater Poland
- County: Jarocin
- Seat: Żerków

Area
  - Total: 170.5 km^{2} (65.8 sq mi)

Population (2006)
  - Total: 10,555
  - Density: 61.91/km^{2} (160.3/sq mi)
  - Urban: 2,058
  - Rural: 8,497
- Website: http://www.zerkow.pl

Gmina Żerków is an urban-rural gmina (administrative district) in Jarocin County, Greater Poland Voivodeship, in west-central Poland. Its seat is the town of Żerków, which lies approximately 12 kilometres (7 mi) north of Jarocin and 58 km (36 mi) south-east of the regional capital Poznań.

The gmina covers an area of 170.5 square kilometres (65.8 sq mi), and as of 2006 its total population is 10,555 (out of which the population of Żerków amounts to 2,058, and the population of the rural part of the gmina is 8,497).

== Villages ==
Apart from the town of Żerków, Gmina Żerków contains the villages and settlements of Antonin, Bieździadów, Brzóstków, Chrzan, Chwałów, Dobieszczyzna, Gąsiorów, Gęczew, Kamień, Komorze Przybysławskie, Kretków, Laski, Lgów, Lisew, Lubinia Mała, Ludwinów, Miniszew, Paruchów, Parzewnia, Pawłowice, Podlesie, Pogorzelica, Prusinów, Przybysław, Raszewy, Rogaszyce, Rozmarynów, Siekierzyn, Sierszew, Śmiełów, Stęgosz, Sucha, Szczonów, Żerniki and Żółków.

== Neighbouring gminas ==
Gmina Żerków is bordered by the gminas of Czermin, Gizałki, Jarocin, Kołaczkowo, Kotlin, Miłosław, Nowe Miasto nad Wartą and Pyzdry.
