= Jaraczewo, Jarocin County =

Jaraczewo
- Town
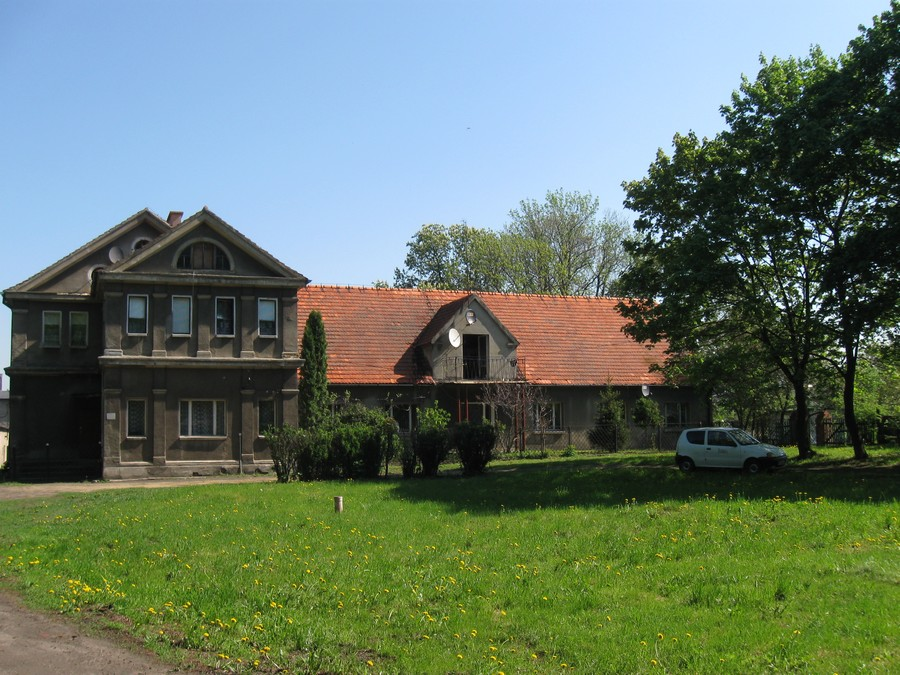
- Manor in Jaraczewo

- Location within Poland
- Coordinates: 51°58′5″N 17°17′48″E
- Country: Poland
- Voivodeship: Greater Poland
- County: Jarocin
- Gmina: Jaraczewo
- Town rights: 1519
- Population: 1,392
- Time zone: UTC+1 (CET)
  - Summer (DST): UTC+2 (CEST)
- Vehicle registration: PJA

Jaraczewo [jaraˈt͡ʂɛvɔ] is a town in Jarocin County, Greater Poland Voivodeship, in west-central Poland. It is the seat of the gmina (administrative district) called Gmina Jaraczewo.

The town has a population of 1,392.

== History ==
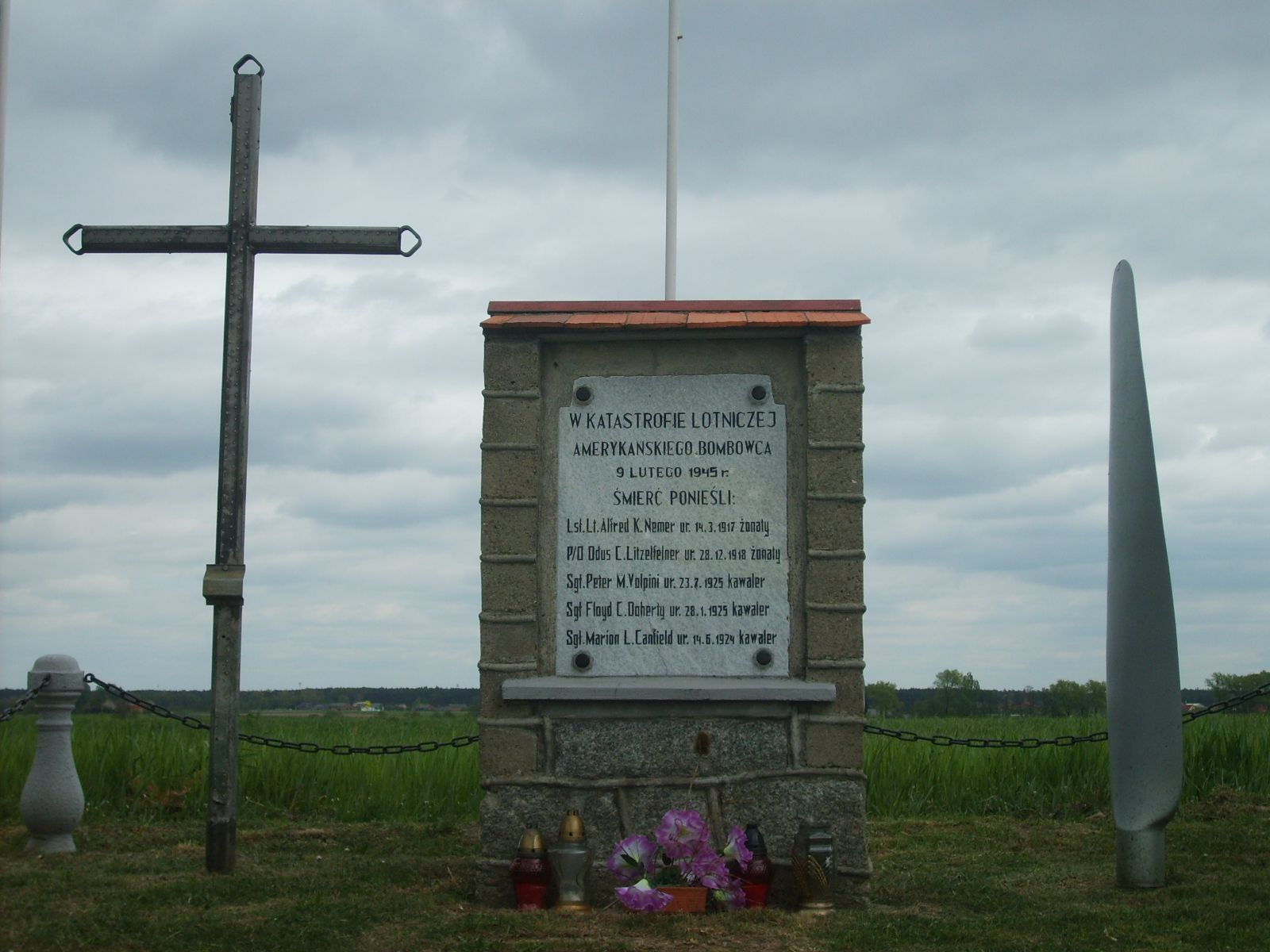
Monument at the place of the American airplane crash in 1945

Jaraczewo was granted town rights in 1519 by Polish King Sigismund I the Old. The name comes from the Old Polish male name Jaracz. Jaraczewo was a private town of Polish nobility, administratively located in the Pyzdry County in the Kalisz Voivodeship in the Greater Poland Province of the Kingdom of Poland. The Jaraczewski noble family hailed from the town.

Under German occupation during World War II it was renamed Obragrund to erase traces of Polish origin. The Polish resistance was active in Jaraczewo. Jan Marian Parowicz, commander of the local unit of the Narodowa Organizacja Bojowa and Union of Armed Struggle organizations, was arrested by the Gestapo in 1942, and then sentenced to death and executed the following year. On February 9, 1945 American B-17G crashed near the town trying to make its way to Soviet controlled territory, after in air collision during bombing mission in Germany.

== Transport ==
Jaraczewo lies along national road 12.

The nearest railway station is in Jarocin.

== Sports ==
The local football team is GKS Jaraczewo. It competes in the lower leagues.
