= Utrata, Greater Poland Voivodeship =

Utrata
- Settlement
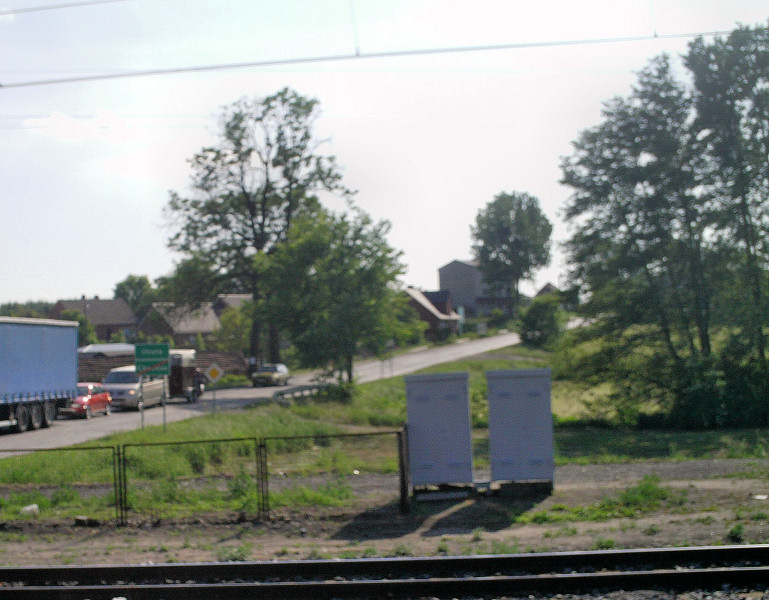

- Location within Poland
- Coordinates: 52°03′59″N 17°21′06″E
- Country: Poland
- Voivodeship: Greater Poland
- County: Środa
- Gmina: Nowe Miasto nad Wartą

Utrata [uˈtrata] is a settlement in the administrative district of Gmina Nowe Miasto nad Wartą, within Środa County, Greater Poland Voivodeship, in west-central Poland.
