= Wolica Nowa =

Village in west-central Poland

- Village
- Location within Poland
- Coordinates: 52°4′39″N 17°27′25″E
- Country: Poland
- Voivodeship: Greater Poland
- County: Środa
- Gmina: Nowe Miasto nad Wartą

Wolica Nowa [vɔˈlit͡sa ˈnɔva] is a village in west-central Poland, located in the administrative district of Gmina Nowe Miasto nad Wartą, within Środa County, Greater Poland Voivodeship.
