= Gmina Jaraczewo =

Gmina Jaraczewo Jaraczewo Commune
- Gmina
- Coat of arms
- Interactive map of Gmina Jaraczewo
- Coordinates (Jaraczewo): 51°58′5″N 17°17′48″E
- Country: Poland
- Voivodeship: Greater Poland
- County: Jarocin
- Seat: Jaraczewo

Area
  - Total: 132.89 km^{2} (51.31 sq mi)

Population (2006)
  - Total: 8,281
  - Density: 62.31/km^{2} (161.4/sq mi)
- Website: http://www.jaraczewo.pl

Gmina Jaraczewo is a rural gmina (administrative district) in Jarocin County, Greater Poland Voivodeship, in west-central Poland. Its seat is the town of Jaraczewo, which lies approximately 14 kilometres (9 mi) west of Jarocin and 55 km (34 mi) south-east of the regional capital Poznań.

The gmina covers an area of 132.89 square kilometres (51.3 sq mi), and as of 2006 its total population is 8,281.

== Villages ==
Gmina Jaraczewo contains the villages and settlements of Bielejewo, Brzostów, Cerekwica, Gola, Góra, Jaraczewo, Łobez, Łobzowiec, Łowęcice, Łukaszewo, Niedźwiady, Nosków, Nowa Cerekwica, Panienka, Parzęczew, Poręba, Rusko, Strzyżewko, Suchorzewko, Wojciechowo and Zalesie.

== Neighbouring gminas ==
Gmina Jaraczewo is bordered by the gminas of Borek Wielkopolski, Dolsk, Jarocin, Koźmin Wielkopolski, Książ Wielkopolski and Nowe Miasto nad Wartą.
