= Jadwigów, Greater Poland Voivodeship =

Jadwigów
- Village
- Location within Poland
- Coordinates: 52°2′33″N 17°22′32″E
- Country: Poland
- Voivodeship: Greater Poland
- County: Środa
- Gmina: Nowe Miasto nad Wartą
- Population: 100

Jadwigów [jadˈviɡuf] is a village in the administrative district of Gmina Nowe Miasto nad Wartą, within Środa County, Greater Poland Voivodeship, in west-central Poland.
