= Wilcza, Greater Poland Voivodeship =

Wilcza
- Village
- Location within Poland
- Coordinates: 51°55′N 17°37′E
- Country: Poland
- Voivodeship: Greater Poland
- County: Jarocin
- Gmina: Kotlin

Wilcza [ˈvilt͡ʂa] is a village in the administrative district of Gmina Kotlin, within Jarocin County, Greater Poland Voivodeship, in west-central Poland.
