= Stramnice =

- Village
- Location within Poland
- Coordinates: 52°2′2″N 17°25′15″E
- Country: Poland
- Voivodeship: Greater Poland
- County: Środa
- Gmina: Nowe Miasto nad Wartą

Stramnice [stramˈnit͡sɛ] is a village in the administrative district of Gmina Nowe Miasto nad Wartą, within Środa County, Greater Poland Voivodeship, in west-central Poland.
