= Sucha Singh =

Sucha Singh may refer to:

- Sucha Singh (athlete), Indian athlete
- Baba Sucha Singh, Indian politician
- Sucha Singh Chhotepur, Indian politician
- Sucha Singh Gill, Indian economist
- Sucha Singh Langah, Indian politician

== See also ==
- Sucha (disambiguation)
- Singh, Indian surname
