= Gmina Nowe Miasto nad Wartą =

Gmina Nowe Miasto nad Wartą Nowe Miasto nad Wartą Commune
- Gmina
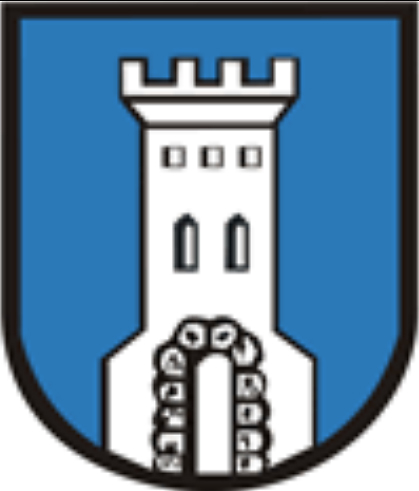
- Coat of arms
- Interactive map of Gmina Nowe Miasto nad Wartą
- Coordinates (Nowe Miasto nad Wartą): 52°5′N 17°24′E
- Country: Poland
- Voivodeship: Greater Poland
- County: Środa
- Seat: Nowe Miasto nad Wartą

Area
  - Total: 119.54 km^{2} (46.15 sq mi)

Population (2006)
  - Total: 9,025
  - Density: 75.50/km^{2} (195.5/sq mi)
- Website: http://www.gmina-nowe-miasto.pl/index.htm

Gmina Nowe Miasto nad Wartą is a rural gmina (administrative district) in Środa County, Greater Poland Voivodeship in west-central Poland. Its seat is the village of Nowe Miasto nad Wartą which lies approximately 19 kilometres (12 mi) south-east of Środa Wielkopolska and 49 km (30 mi) south-east of the regional capital Poznań.

The gmina covers an area of 119.54 square kilometres (46.2 sq mi), and as of 2006, its total population is 9,025.

== Villages ==
Gmina Nowe Miasto nad Wartą contains the villages and settlements of Aleksandrów, Boguszyn, Boguszynek, Chocicza, Chromiec, Chwalęcin, Dąbrowa, Dębno, Elżbietów, Hermanów, Jadwigów, Klęka, Kolniczki, Komorze Nowe, Komorze Nowomiejskie, Kruczyn, Kruczynek, Lutynia, Michałów, Nowe Miasto nad Wartą, Radliniec, Rogusko, Skoraczew, Stramnice, Świętomierz, Szypłów, Teresa, Tokarów, Utrata, Wolica Kozia, Wolica Nowa and Wolica Pusta.

== Neighbouring gminas ==
Gmina Nowe Miasto nad Wartą is bordered by the gminas of Jaraczewo, Jarocin, Krzykosy, Książ Wielkopolski, Miłosław and Żerków.
