= Nowe Miasto nad Wartą =

- Village
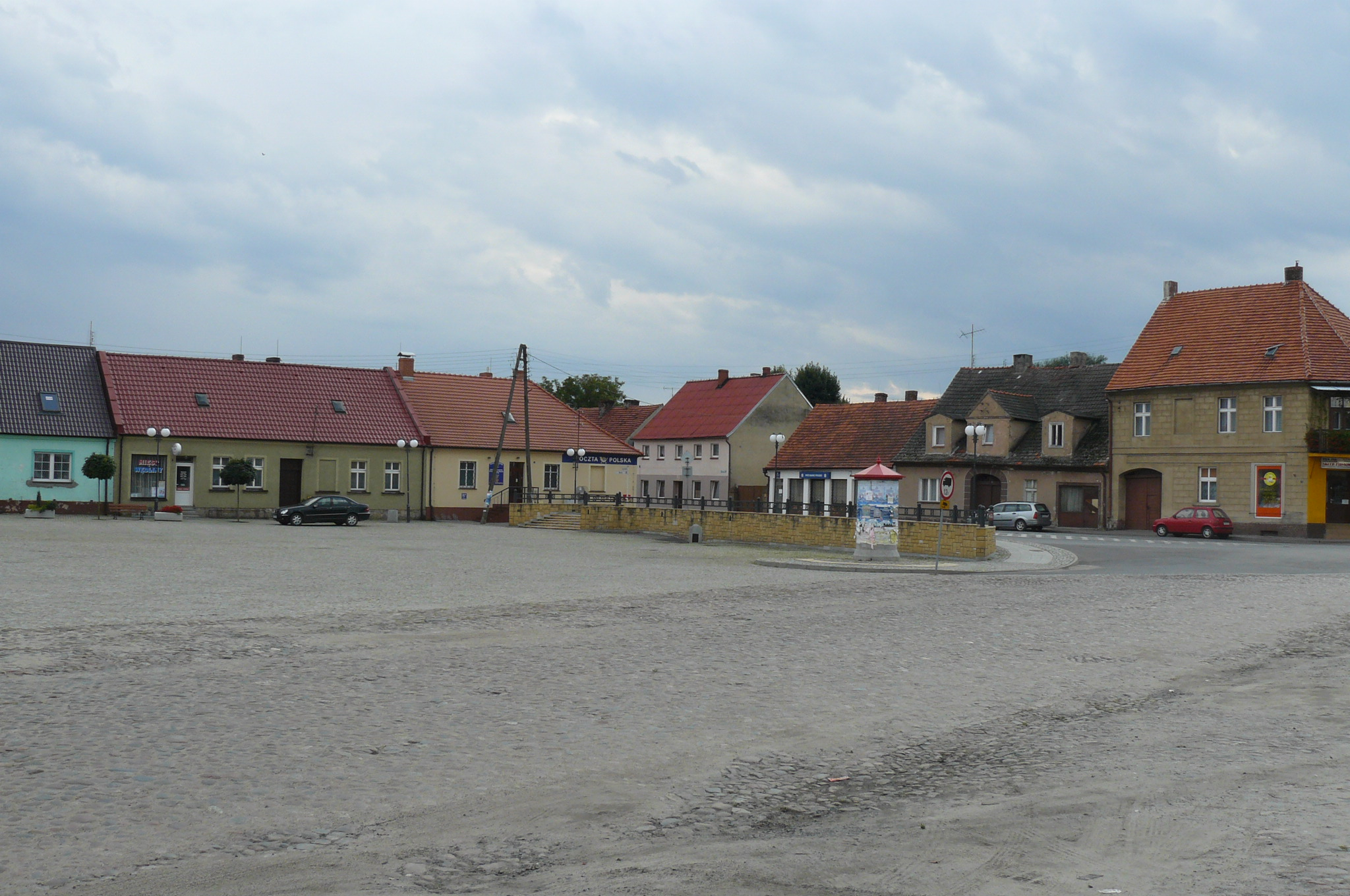
- Market Square

- Location within Poland
- Coordinates: 52°5′N 17°24′E
- Country: Poland
- Voivodeship: Greater Poland
- County: Środa
- Gmina: Nowe Miasto nad Wartą
- Population: 1,543

Nowe Miasto nad Wartą (Polish: [ˈnɔvɛ ˈmjastɔ nad ˈvartɔ̃]; German: Neustadt an der Warthe) is a village in Środa County, Greater Poland Voivodeship, in west-central Poland. It is the seat of the gmina (administrative district) called Gmina Nowe Miasto nad Wartą.
