= Bielejewo, Jarocin County =

Bielejewo
- Village
- Location within Poland
- Coordinates: 52°0′35″N 17°22′51″E
- Country: Poland
- Voivodeship: Greater Poland
- County: Jarocin
- Gmina: Jaraczewo

Bielejewo [bjɛlɛˈjɛvɔ] is a village in the administrative district of Gmina Jaraczewo, within Jarocin County, Greater Poland Voivodeship, in west-central Poland.
