= Wolica Kozia =

- Village
- Location within Poland
- Coordinates: 52°5′N 17°27′E
- Country: Poland
- Voivodeship: Greater Poland
- County: Środa
- Gmina: Nowe Miasto nad Wartą

Wolica Kozia [vɔˈlit͡sa ˈkɔʑa] is a village in the administrative district of Gmina Nowe Miasto nad Wartą, within Środa County, Greater Poland Voivodeship, in west-central Poland.
