= Lutynia, Gmina Nowe Miasto nad Wartą =

Lutynia
- Settlement
- Location within Poland
- Coordinates: 52°7′1″N 17°32′24″E
- Country: Poland
- Voivodeship: Greater Poland
- County: Środa
- Gmina: Nowe Miasto nad Wartą

Lutynia [luˈtɨɲa] is a settlement in the administrative district of Gmina Nowe Miasto nad Wartą, within Środa County, Greater Poland Voivodeship, in west-central Poland.
