= Gąsiorów, Jarocin County =

Gąsiorów
- Settlement
- Location within Poland
- Coordinates: 52°7′50″N 17°33′33″E
- Country: Poland
- Voivodeship: Greater Poland
- County: Jarocin
- Gmina: Żerków

Gąsiorów [ɡɔ̃ˈɕɔruf] is a settlement in the administrative district of Gmina Żerków, within Jarocin County, Greater Poland Voivodeship, in west-central Poland.
