= Komorze Nowomiejskie =

- Village
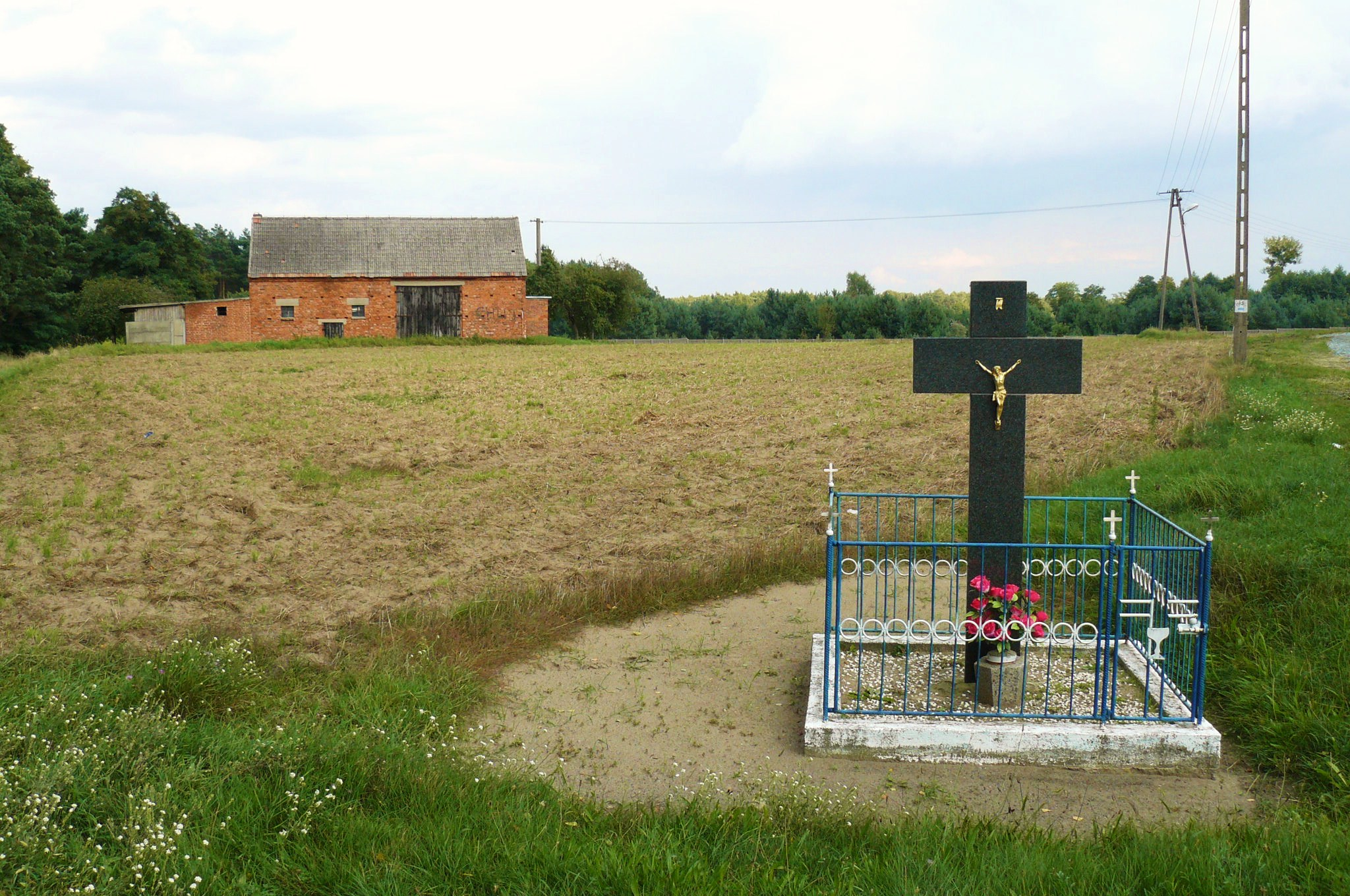
- Cross in Komorze Nowomiejskie

- Location within Poland
- Coordinates: 52°05′05″N 17°21′50″E
- Country: Poland
- Voivodeship: Greater Poland
- County: Środa
- Gmina: Nowe Miasto nad Wartą

Komorze Nowomiejskie [kɔˈmɔʐɛ nɔvɔˈmjɛi̯skʲɛ] is a village in the administrative district of Gmina Nowe Miasto nad Wartą, within Środa County, Greater Poland Voivodeship, in west-central Poland.
