= Gmina Kotlin =

Gmina Kotlin Kotlin Commune
- Gmina
- Coat of arms
- Interactive map of Gmina Kotlin
- Coordinates (Kotlin): 51°54′36″N 17°39′0″E
- Country: Poland
- Voivodeship: Greater Poland
- County: Jarocin
- Seat: Kotlin

Area
  - Total: 84.08 km^{2} (32.46 sq mi)

Population (2006)
  - Total: 7,124
  - Density: 84.73/km^{2} (219.4/sq mi)
- Website: http://www.kotlin.com/

Gmina Kotlin is a rural gmina (administrative district) in Jarocin County, Greater Poland Voivodeship, in west-central Poland. Its seat is the village of Kotlin, which lies approximately 13 kilometres (8 mi) south-east of Jarocin and 74 km (46 mi) south-east of the regional capital Poznań.

The gmina covers an area of 84.08 square kilometres (32.5 sq mi), and as of 2006 its total population is 7,124.

== Villages ==
Gmina Kotlin contains the villages and settlements of Kotlin, Kurcew, Magnuszewice, Orpiszewek, Parzew, Racendów, Sławoszew, Twardów, Wilcza, Wola Książęca, Wysogotówek and Wyszki.

== Neighbouring gminas ==
Gmina Kotlin is bordered by the gminas of Czermin, Dobrzyca, Jarocin, Pleszew and Żerków.
