= Aleksandrów, Gmina Nowe Miasto nad Wartą =

Aleksandrów
- Village
- Location within Poland
- Coordinates: 52°3′46″N 17°24′36″E
- Country: Poland
- Voivodeship: Greater Poland
- County: Środa
- Gmina: Nowe Miasto nad Wartą

Aleksandrów [alɛkˈsandruf] is a village in the administrative district of Gmina Nowe Miasto nad Wartą, within Środa County, Greater Poland Voivodeship, in west-central Poland.
