= Tokarów =

- Settlement
- Location within Poland
- Coordinates: 52°2′6″N 17°23′44″E
- Country: Poland
- Voivodeship: Greater Poland
- County: Środa
- Gmina: Nowe Miasto nad Wartą

Tokarów [tɔˈkaruf] is a settlement in the administrative district of Gmina Nowe Miasto nad Wartą, within Środa County, Greater Poland Voivodeship, in west-central Poland.
