= Kruczyn =

- Village
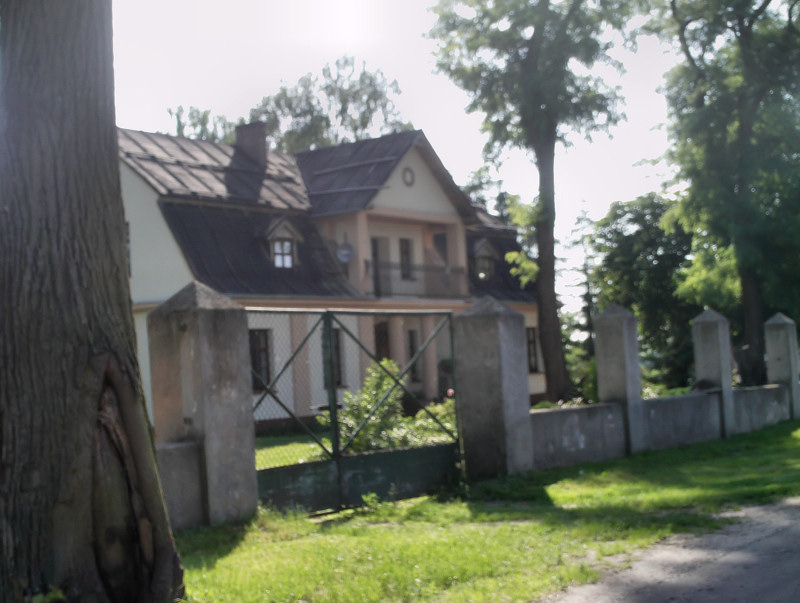

- Location within Poland
- Coordinates: 52°2′7″N 17°19′59″E
- Country: Poland
- Voivodeship: Greater Poland
- County: Środa
- Gmina: Nowe Miasto nad Wartą
- Population: 500

Kruczyn [ˈkrut͡ʂɨn] is a village in the administrative district of Gmina Nowe Miasto nad Wartą, within Środa County, Greater Poland Voivodeship, in west-central Poland.

== Name ==
The village has medieval origins and has existed since at least the first half of the 15th century. It was formerly known by a different name and was recorded as Krotoczyno. The earliest surviving record of the village is a Latin document from 1417, preserved in a copy from 1546, in which it was recorded under the Latinized Old Polish name Czotchczyno. Later forms of the name include Krothczyno (1436), Croczino (1481), Crothczino (1494), Croczina (1530), and Croczyno (1530).
