= Sucha, Greater Poland Voivodeship =

Sucha
- Village
- Location within Poland
- Coordinates: 52°0′18″N 17°41′22″E
- Country: Poland
- Voivodeship: Greater Poland
- County: Jarocin
- Gmina: Żerków

Sucha [ˈsuxa] is a village in the administrative district of Gmina Żerków, within Jarocin County, Greater Poland Voivodeship, in west-central Poland.
