= Skoraczew =

- Village
- Location within Poland
- Coordinates: 52°1′14″N 17°19′17″E
- Country: Poland
- Voivodeship: Greater Poland
- County: Środa
- Gmina: Nowe Miasto nad Wartą

Skoraczew [skɔˈrat͡ʂɛf] is a village in the administrative district of Gmina Nowe Miasto nad Wartą, within Środa County, Greater Poland Voivodeship, in west-central Poland.
