= Szypłów =

- Village
- Location within Poland
- Coordinates: 52°2′1″N 17°24′11″E
- Country: Poland
- Voivodeship: Greater Poland
- County: Środa
- Gmina: Nowe Miasto nad Wartą
- Elevation: 97 m (318 ft)

Szypłów [ˈʂɨpwuf] is a village in the administrative district of Gmina Nowe Miasto nad Wartą, within Środa County, Greater Poland Voivodeship, in west-central Poland.
