= Dąbrowa, Gmina Nowe Miasto nad Wartą =

Dąbrowa
- Settlement
- Location within Poland
- Coordinates: 52°9′13″N 17°37′19″E
- Country: Poland
- Voivodeship: Greater Poland
- County: Środa
- Gmina: Nowe Miasto nad Wartą

Dąbrowa [dɔmˈbrɔva] is a settlement in the administrative district of Gmina Nowe Miasto nad Wartą, within Środa County, Greater Poland Voivodeship, in west-central Poland.
