= Chocicza, Gmina Nowe Miasto nad Wartą =

Chocicza
- Village
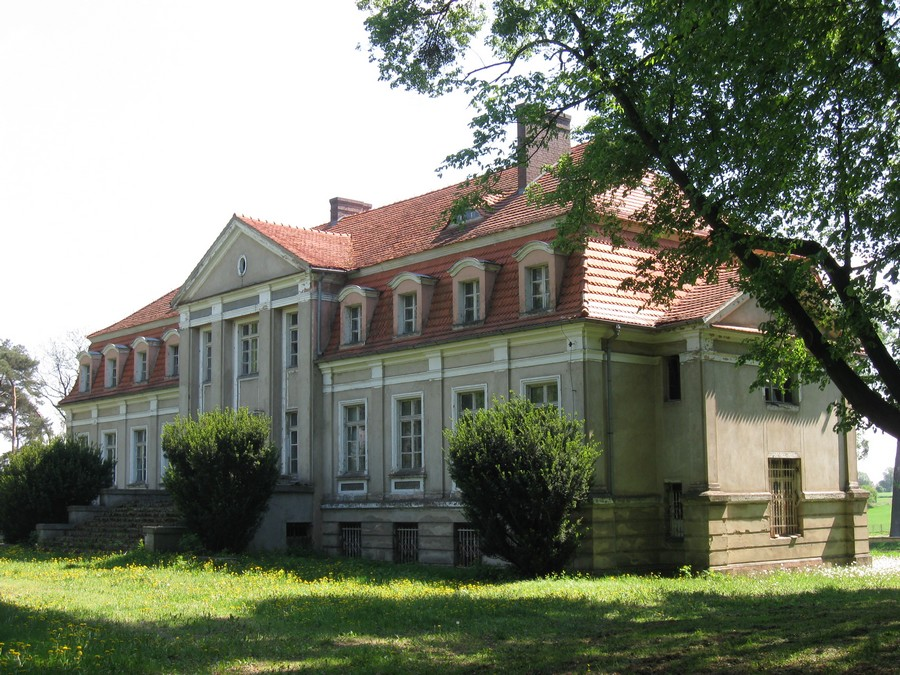
- Chocicza palace

- Location within Poland
- Coordinates: 52°04′11″N 17°21′24″E
- Country: Poland
- Voivodeship: Greater Poland
- County: Środa
- Gmina: Nowe Miasto nad Wartą
- Population: 1,150

Chocicza [xɔˈt͡ɕit͡ʂa] is a village in the administrative district of Gmina Nowe Miasto nad Wartą, within Środa County, Greater Poland Voivodeship, in west-central Poland.
