= Żerków =

Town in Greater Poland Voivodeship, Poland

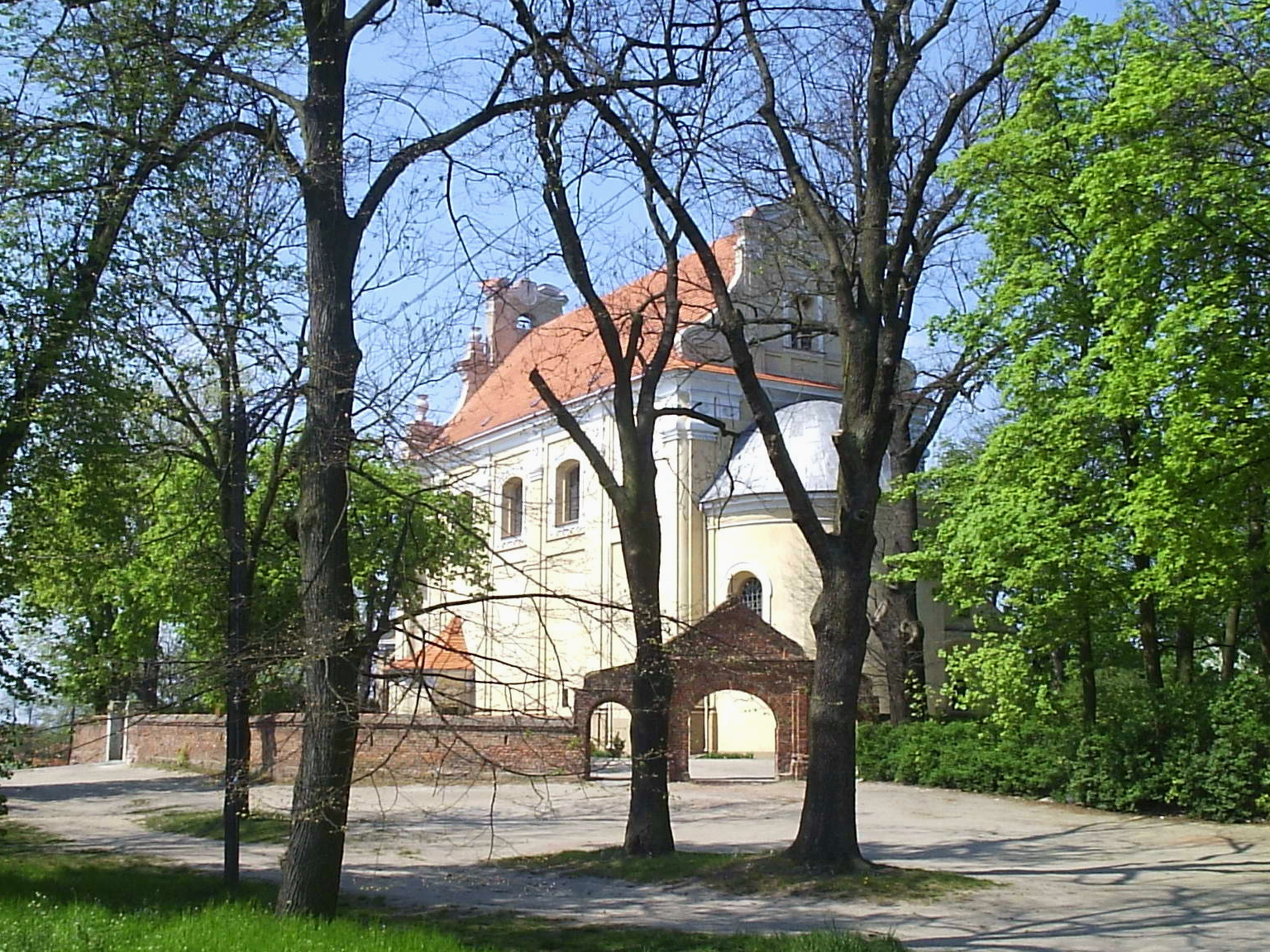
- Church of Saint Stanislaus

- Flag Coat of arms

- Location within Poland
- Coordinates: 52°4′N 17°34′E
- Country: Poland
- Voivodeship: Greater Poland
- County: Jarocin
- Gmina: Żerków
- First mentioned: 1257
- Town rights: 1283 or earlier

Area
  - Total: 2.03 km^{2} (0.78 sq mi)

Population (2010)
  - Total: 2,122
  - Density: 1,050/km^{2} (2,710/sq mi)
- Time zone: UTC+1 (CET)
  - Summer (DST): UTC+2 (CEST)
- Postal code: 63-210
- Vehicle registration: PJA
- Climate: Dfb
- Website: https://www.zerkow.pl

Żerków ([ˈʐɛrkuf]) is a town in Jarocin County, Greater Poland Voivodeship, Poland, with 2,122 inhabitants (2010). It is located 53 kilometres (33 mi) east of the regional capital of Poznań.

The town is near the Żerków-Czeszewo Landscape Park.

== History ==
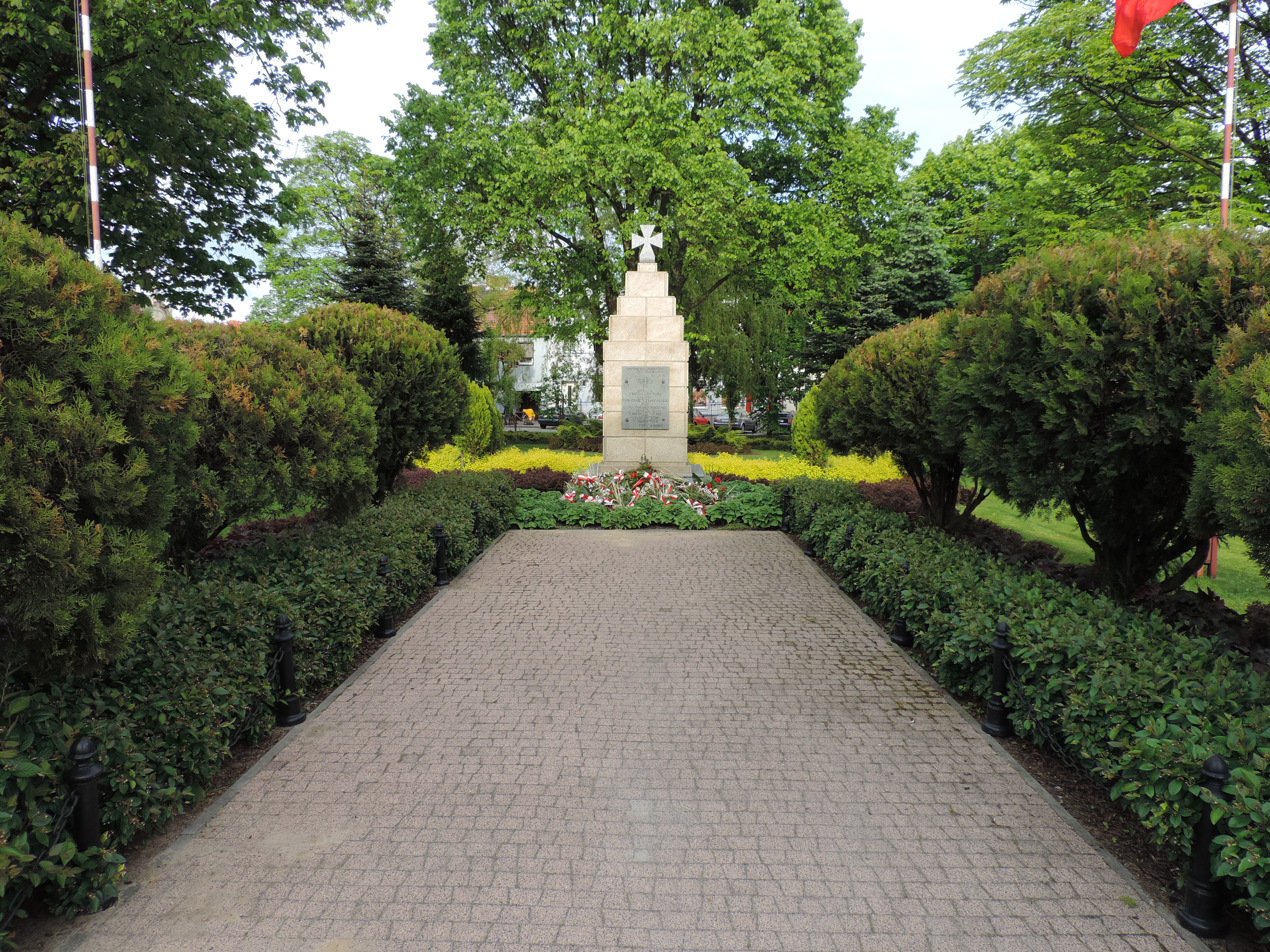
Memorial to Poles fallen in the fights for Poland's independence in World War I, Greater Poland Uprising, Polish–Soviet War and World War II

The oldest known mention of Żerków comes from a document of Duke Bolesław the Pious from 1257, and in a document of Duke and future King of Poland Przemysł II from 1283 it was already referred to as a town. Żerków was a private town of Polish nobility, administratively located in the Pyzdry County in the Kalisz Voivodeship in the Greater Poland Province. In 1574, the newly elected King Henry of Valois stopped in Żerków before his royal coronation in Kraków. In 1623 the town was visited by King Sigismund III Vasa and prince royal (and future king) Władysław IV Vasa.

The Radomicki noble family erected the Baroque Church of Saint Stanislaus, which is the town's greatest historic landmark.

Historical population
Year	Pop.	±%
1905	1,631	—
1921	1,549	−5.0%
1931	1,569	+1.3%
2010	2,122	+35.2%

Following the Second Partition of Poland Żerków became a part of Prussia. After the successful Greater Poland uprising of 1806, it was regained by Poles and included within the short-lived Duchy of Warsaw. It was re-annexed by Prussia in 1815, and from 1815 until 1920 it was a part of the Province of Posen. As a consequence of the Treaty of Versailles, the town became a part of the newly founded Second Polish Republic.

After the joint German-Soviet invasion of Poland, which started World War II, it was occupied by Germany in 1939. All residents of Jewish origin were expelled from the town soon after the arrival of the Germans. Żerków was used by the Germans as a resort spot for soldiers. In the years 1941–44 the Jewish cemetery was destroyed and its tombstones used as construction material. In 1943, the Germans renamed the town Bergstadt to erase traces of Polish origin. In 1945, the German occupation ended and the historic name was restored.

In 1962 a telecommunication tower of reinforced concrete similar to that at Piątkowo, Poznań was built.

== Sports ==
The local football team is GKS Żerków. It competes in the lower leagues.

== People ==
- Albert Wojciech Adamkiewicz
- Heinrich Graetz
- Jakob Steinhardt
- Henry Heppner
