= Antoni Gąsiorowski =

Polish historian

Antoni Gąsiorowski (born 24 November 1932 in Poznań) is a Polish medievalist historian, professor of humanities, member of the Polish Academy of Arts and Sciences.

He graduated from Adam Mickiewicz University in Poznań (1953) with a degree in history in 1953. He worked at the Institute of History (Tadeusz Manteuffel) of the Polish Academy of Sciences.

In the years 1987–1996 he was the president of the Poznań Society of Friends of Sciences.

== Main works ==
- Powiat w Wielkopolsce XIV–XVI wieku : z zagadnień zarządu terytorialnego i podziałów Polski późnośredniowiecznej (English: Powiat in Wielkopolska of the 14th and 16th centuries: issues of territorial administration and divisions of late medieval Poland) (1965)
- Officials of the local board in late medieval Greater Poland (1970)
- Starostowie wielkopolskich miast królewskich w dobie jagiellońskiej [Starostas of the royal cities of Greater Poland in the Jagiellonian era] (1981)
- Public notaries in Wielkopolska at the end of the Middle Ages: the catalog of admissions in Gniezno and Poznań (1420-1500) (1993)
