= Boguszyn, Gmina Nowe Miasto nad Wartą =

Boguszyn
- Village
- Location within Poland
- Coordinates: 52°4′N 17°21′E
- Country: Poland
- Voivodeship: Greater Poland
- County: Środa
- Gmina: Nowe Miasto nad Wartą
- Population: 960

Boguszyn [bɔˈɡuʂɨn] is a village in the administrative district of Gmina Nowe Miasto nad Wartą, within Środa County, Greater Poland Voivodeship, in west-central Poland.
