= Kruczynek =

- Village
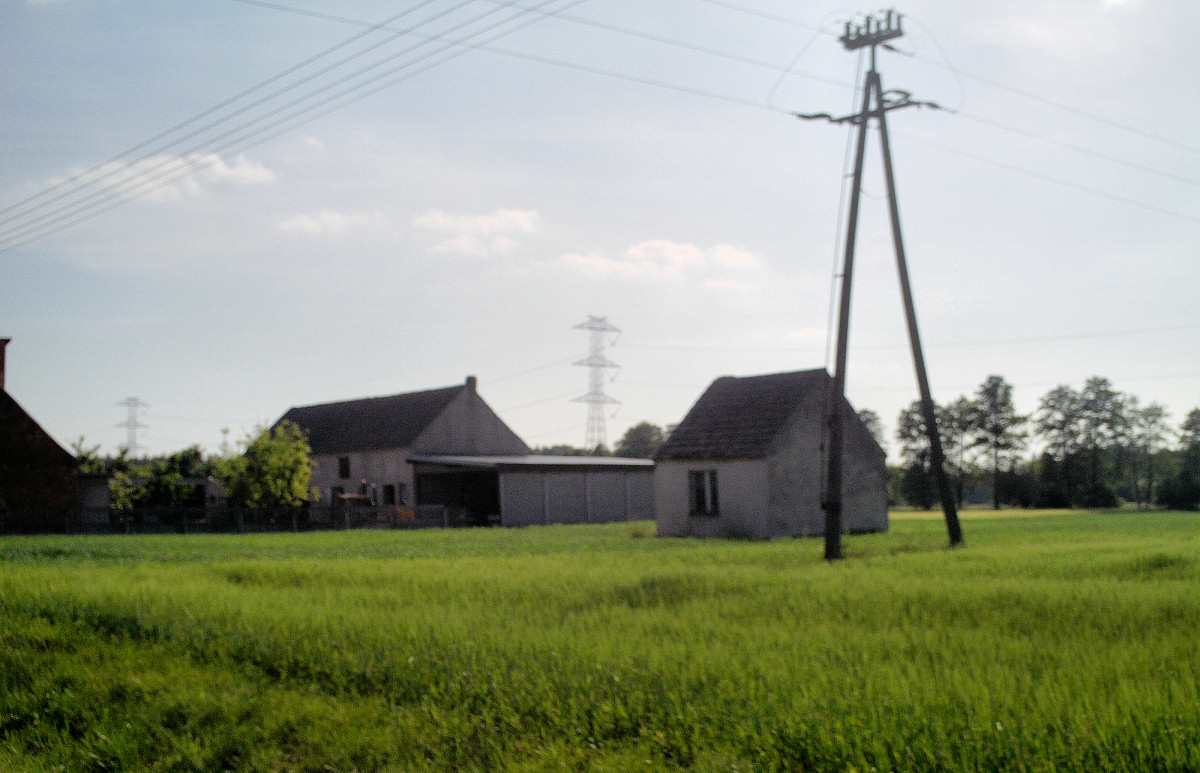

- Location within Poland
- Coordinates: 52°03′02″N 17°19′18″E
- Country: Poland
- Voivodeship: Greater Poland
- County: Środa
- Gmina: Nowe Miasto nad Wartą

Kruczynek [kruˈt͡ʂɨnɛk] is a village in the administrative district of Gmina Nowe Miasto nad Wartą, within Środa County, Greater Poland Voivodeship, in west-central Poland.

The railway station of Chocicza is situated 3 km northeast of Kruczynek.
