= Kotlin, Greater Poland Voivodeship =

Kotlin
- Village
- Location within Poland
- Coordinates: 51°54′36″N 17°39′0″E
- Country: Poland
- Voivodeship: Greater Poland
- County: Jarocin
- Gmina: Kotlin
- Elevation: 124 m (407 ft)
- Population: 3,416
- Website: http://www.kotlin.com/

Kotlin [ˈkɔtlin] is a village in Jarocin County, Greater Poland Voivodeship, in west-central Poland. It is the seat of the gmina (administrative district) called Gmina Kotlin.
