= Hlavňovice =

- Municipality
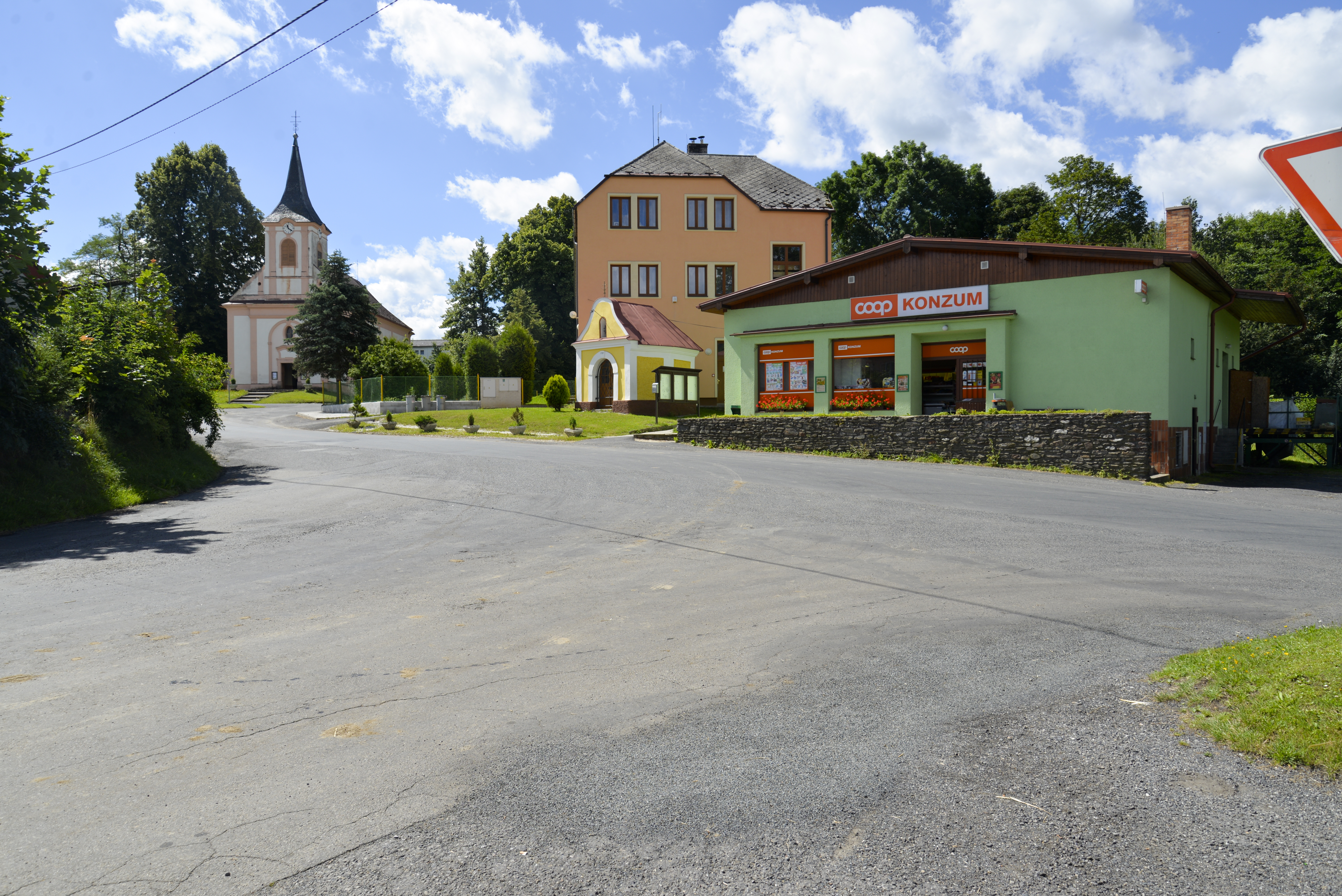
- Centre of Hlavňovice

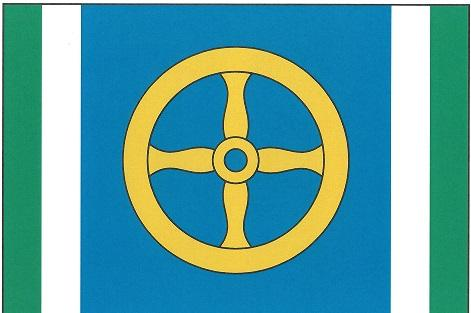
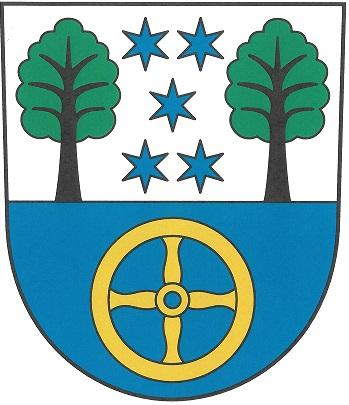
- Flag Coat of arms

- Location in the Czech Republic
- Coordinates: 49°14′17″N 13°23′42″E
- Country: Czech Republic
- Region: Plzeň
- District: Klatovy
- First mentioned: 1428

Area
  - Total: 24.10 km^{2} (9.31 sq mi)
- Elevation: 687 m (2,254 ft)

Population (2026-01-01)
  - Total: 488
  - Density: 20.2/km^{2} (52.4/sq mi)
- Time zone: UTC+1 (CET)
  - Summer (DST): UTC+2 (CEST)
- Postal codes: 341 42, 342 01
- Website: www.hlavnovice.cz

Hlavňovice is a municipality and village in Klatovy District in the Plzeň Region of the Czech Republic. It has about 500 inhabitants.

Hlavňovice lies approximately 20 kilometres (12 mi) south-east of Klatovy, 58 km (36 mi) south of Plzeň, and 121 km (75 mi) south-west of Prague.

== Administrative division ==
Hlavňovice consists of 15 municipal parts (in brackets population according to the 2021 census):

- Hlavňovice (106)
- Častonice (22)
- Čeletice (5)
- Cihelna (28)
- Horní Staňkov (18)
- Javoříčko (8)
- Libětice (36)
- Milínov (105)
- Pích (21)
- Přestanice (22)
- Puchverk (9)
- Radostice (22)
- Suchá (24)
- Zámyšl (61)
- Zvíkov (4)

== Demographics ==
Historical population
Year	Pop.	±%
1869	1,543	—
1880	1,478	−4.2%
1890	1,326	−10.3%
1900	1,325	−0.1%
1910	1,249	−5.7%
1921	1,207	−3.4%
1930	1,178	−2.4%
1950	757	−35.7%
1961	764	+0.9%
1970	675	−11.6%
1980	576	−14.7%
1991	542	−5.9%
2001	502	−7.4%
2011	469	−6.6%
2021	491	+4.7%
Source: Censuses
