= Jarocin County =

Jarocin County Powiat jarociński
- County
- Flag Coat of arms

- Location within the voivodeship
- Coordinates (Jarocin): 51°58′N 17°30′E
- Country: Poland
- Voivodeship: Greater Poland
- Seat: Jarocin
- Gminas: Total 4: Gmina Jaraczewo; Gmina Jarocin; Gmina Kotlin; Gmina Żerków

Area
  - Total: 587.7 km^{2} (226.9 sq mi)

Population (2006)
  - Total: 70,390
  - Density: 119.8/km^{2} (310.2/sq mi)
  - Urban: 27,892
  - Rural: 42,498
- Car plates: PJA
- Website: www.powiat-jarocinski.pl

Jarocin County (Polish: powiat jarociński) is a unit of territorial administration and local government (powiat) in Greater Poland Voivodeship, west-central Poland. It came into being on January 1, 1999, as a result of the Polish local government reforms passed in 1998. Its administrative seat and largest town is Jarocin, which lies 63 kilometres (39 mi) south-east of the regional capital Poznań. The only other town in the county is Żerków, lying 12 km (7 mi) north of Jarocin.

The county covers an area of 587.7 square kilometres (226.9 sq mi). As of 2006 its total population is 70,390, out of which the population of Jarocin is 25,834, that of Żerków is 2,058, and the rural population is 42,498.

== Neighbouring counties ==
Jarocin County is bordered by Środa County and Września County to the north, Pleszew County to the east, Krotoszyn County to the south, and Gostyń County and Śrem County to the west.

== Administrative divisions ==
The county is subdivided into four gminas (two urban-rural and two rural). These are listed in the following table, in descending order of population.

Gmina	Type	Area (km^{2})	Population (2006)	Seat
Gmina Jarocin	urban-rural	200.2	44,430	Jarocin
Gmina Żerków	urban-rural	170.5	10,555	Żerków
Gmina Jaraczewo	rural	132.9	8,281	Jaraczewo
Gmina Kotlin	rural	84.1	7,124	Kotlin
