= Villa La Rotonda =

Renaissance villa just outside Vicenza in northern Italy

Villa Almerico Capra
UNESCO World Heritage Site
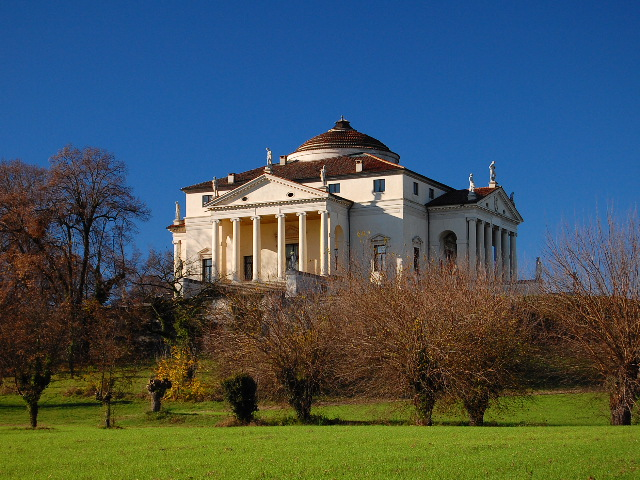

- Location within Veneto Location within Italy
- Location: Vicenza, Veneto, Italy
- Part of: City of Vicenza and the Palladian Villas of the Veneto
- Criteria: Cultural: (i), (ii)
- Reference: 712bis-04
- Inscription: 1994 (18th Session)
- Extensions: 1996
- Area: 9.00 hectares (22.2 acres)
- Website: villalarotonda.it
- Coordinates: 45°31′53″N 11°33′37″E

Villa La Rotonda is a Renaissance villa just outside Vicenza in Northern Italy designed by Italian Renaissance architect Andrea Palladio, and begun in 1567, though not completed until 1605. The villa's official name is Villa Almerico Capra Valmarana, but it is also known as "La Rotonda", "Villa Rotonda", "Villa Capra", and "Villa Almerico Capra". The name Capra derives from the Capra brothers, who completed the building after they acquired it in 1592. Along with other works by Palladio, the building is conserved as part of the World Heritage Site "City of Vicenza and the Palladian Villas of the Veneto".

== Inspiration ==
In 1565 Paolo Almerico, a clerk and nobleman, on his retirement from the Vatican (as referendario apostolico of Pope Pius IV and afterwards Pius V), returned to his home town of Vicenza in the Venetian countryside and built a country house.Some like to consider this being the first addition of suburbs as it wasn’t built to be surrounding a farm. The building wasn’t meant to actually be inhabited even though it is described as a habitable place. It is proportionate enough where someone could live there but not a reputable family over the summer time. This house, later known as 'La Rotonda', was to be one of Palladio's best-known legacies to the architectural world. Villa Capra may have inspired a thousand subsequent buildings, but the villa was itself inspired by the Pantheon in Rome. It was also inspired by Christian and pagan architecture in the columns of the four pronai, the building is described to be a villa temple.

== Design ==
The site selected was a hilltop just outside the city of Vicenza. Unlike some other Palladian villas of the Veneto, the building was not designed from the start to accommodate a working farm. This sophisticated building was designed for a site which was, in modern terminology, "suburban". Palladio classed the building as a "palazzo" rather than a villa.

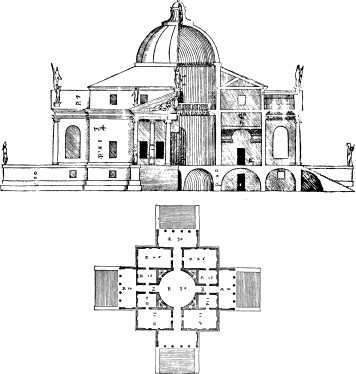
Palladio's plan of Villa La Rotonda in I quattro libri dell'architettura, 1570

The design is for a completely symmetrical building having a square plan with four facades, each of which has a projecting portico. The whole is contained within an imaginary circle which touches each corner of the building and centres of the porticos (illustration, left). On all four facades built is a loggia where there are statues made by Master Lorenzi Vicentino. Under these and under the hall's level are rooms for the household's use and convenience.

The name La Rotonda refers to the central circular hall with its dome. To describe the villa, as a whole, as a rotunda is technically incorrect, as the building is not circular but rather the intersection of a square with a cross. Each portico has steps leading up to it, and opens via a small cabinet or corridor to the circular domed central hall. The Hall is located in the center and tends to catch the light from the top. The smaller rooms located in the villa are mezzanines, over the big rooms that have vaults fashioned in the first manner and connects back to the hall and around. This and all other rooms were proportioned with mathematical precision according to Palladio's rules of architecture which he published in I quattro libri dell'architettura. In Palladio's book Quattro Libri, it shows a high pitched roof and dome which in the actual building is low pitched and the dome is stepped. Work spaces for the villa's servants are hidden underneath the first floor, which is accessed via staircases hidden inside the walls of the central hall.

The design reflected the humanist values of Renaissance architecture. In order for each room to have some sun, the design was rotated 45 degrees from each cardinal point of the compass. Each of the four porticos has pediments graced by statues of classical deities. The pediments were each supported by six Ionic columns. Each portico was flanked by a single window. All principal rooms were on the second floor or piano nobile.

Building began in 1567. Neither Palladio nor the owner, Paolo Almerico, were to see the completion of the villa. The owner Almerico passed away in 1589 where the Villa was then transferred over to his illegitimate son Virginio. Palladio died in 1580 and a second architect, Vincenzo Scamozzi, was employed by the new owners to oversee the completion. One of the major changes he made to the original plan was to modify the two-storey central hall.

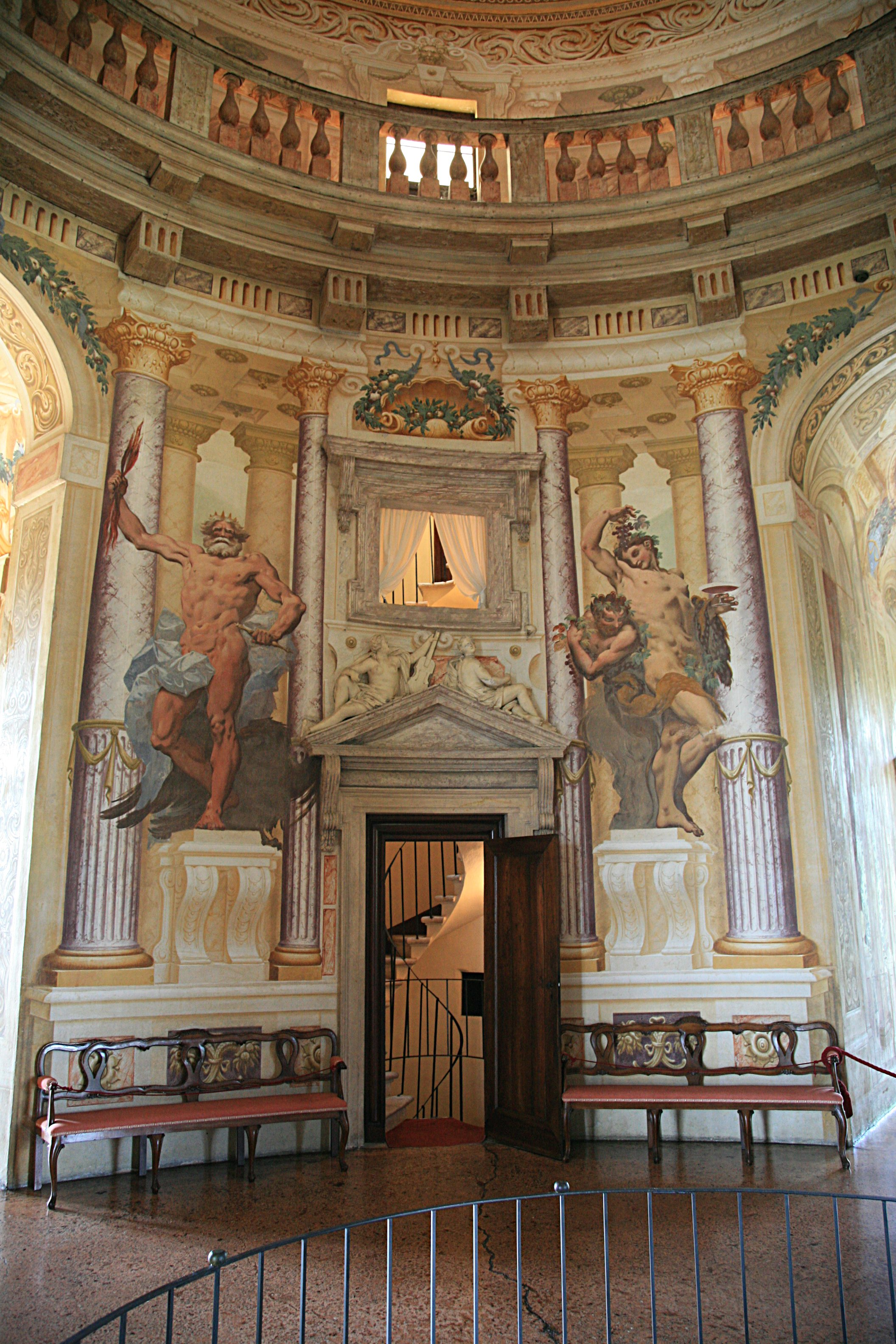
Interior of the rotonda

Palladio had intended it to be covered by a high semi-circular dome but Scamozzi designed a lower dome with an oculus (intended to be open to the sky) inspired by the Pantheon in Rome. The dome was ultimately completed with a cupola.

After the Villa was built, analysts saw that it differed from the original drawings of Palladio. In understanding it they have been confronted with three different versions. Firstly, the original published by Palladio in I quattro libri dell'architettura of 1570. The second is the current finished product of the construction. And third is the state of its first completion. The building's access points are only through the four pronaos, and unlike any other normal villa, the service quarters and the granary can only be accessed through the central hall then through the four internal staircases. However this part of the design was in Palladio's original drawings but now the current standing version allows direct access from the outside into the service floor. The design circulation isn’t optimal for the space. Carts that bring in fresh agricultural produce have to make a sharp turn at the corner to get into the building and there isn’t any connection to the central; space from the staircases on the ground level.

== Interior ==
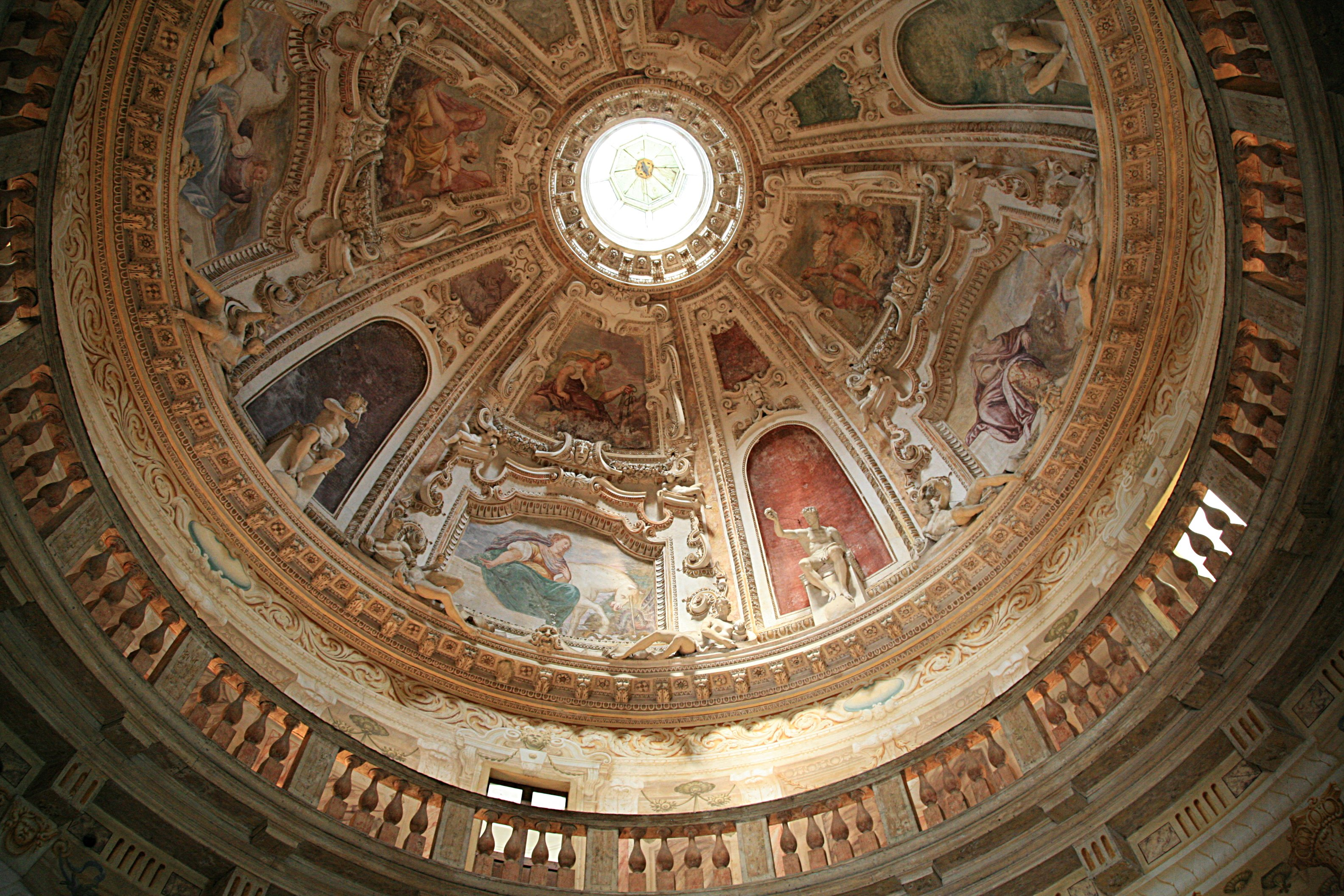
The cupola

The interior design of the Villa was to be as wonderful, if not more so, than the exterior.

Alessandro, Giovanni Battista Maganza, and Anselmo Canera were commissioned to paint frescoes in the principal salons. The rich stucco and fresco design of the interior was created by Domenico Fontana and Ruggero Bescapè.

Among the four principal salons on the piano nobile are the West Salon (also called the Holy Room, because of the religious nature of its frescoes and ceiling), and the East Salon, which contains an allegorical life story of the first owner, Paolo Almerico, his many admirable qualities portrayed in fresco.

The highlight of the interior is the central, circular hall, surrounded by a fifteen and a half feet deep balcony and covered by the domed ceiling; it soars the full height of the main house up to the cupola, with walls decorated in trompe-l'œil.

Abundant frescoes create an atmosphere that is more reminiscent of a cathedral than the principal salon of a country house.

Palladio studied the light and how it would enter the building where it eliminates external volumes. The angle of the villa points on all four cardinal points where it ensures that through the day the south and west sides have equal sun time to light the spaces. During the winter months, these two sides are equally lit by the sun passing from 20 degrees to 0 degrees.

== Landscape ==
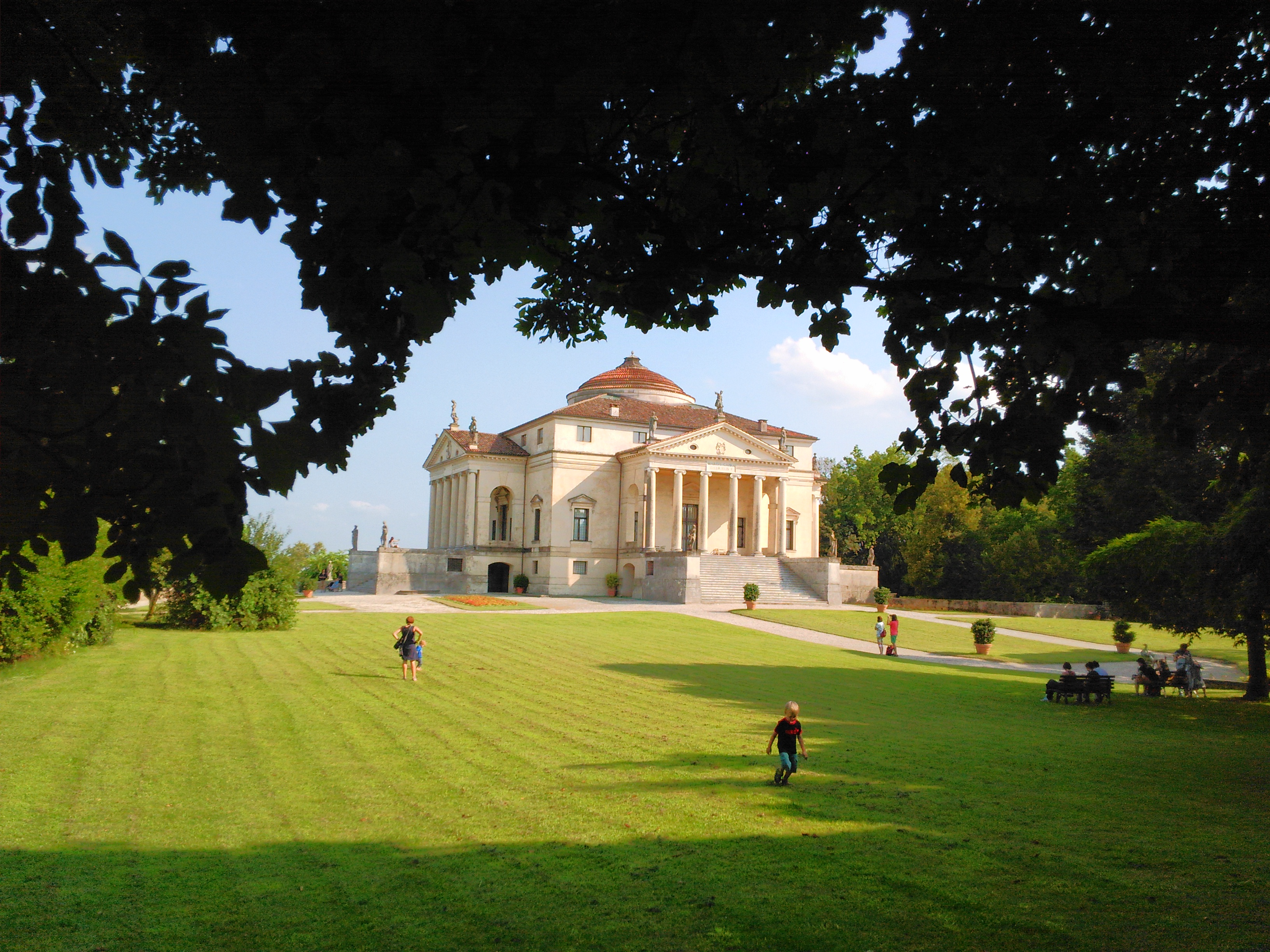
Landscape

From the porticos, views of the surrounding countryside can be seen; this is purposeful as the Villa was designed to be in harmony with the landscape.

This was in contrast to such buildings as Villa Farnese of just 16 years earlier.

While the house appears to be completely symmetrical, it actually has deviations, designed to allow each façade to complement the surrounding landscape and topography. The villa lands on a gently sloping hill with the Bacchiglione flowing on one side and the hills surrounding on the other side, which gives the appearance of a very great theater. Due to these typography characteristics, there are variations in the façades, in the width of steps, retaining walls, etc. In this way, the symmetry of the architecture allows for the asymmetry of the landscape, and creates a seemingly symmetrical whole. The landscape is a panoramic vision of trees, meadows and woods, with Vicenza on the horizon.

The northwest portico is set onto the hill as the termination of a straight carriage drive from the principal gates. This carriageway is an avenue between the service blocks, built by the Capra brothers, who acquired the Villa in 1591; they commissioned Vincenzo Scamozzi to complete the villa and construct the range of staff and agricultural buildings.

== Current conditions ==
In 1994 UNESCO designated the building as part of a World Heritage Site.

A former family owner of the villa was Mario di Valmarana (1929–2010), a former professor of architecture at the University of Virginia. It was his declared ambition to preserve Villa Rotonda so that it may be appreciated by future generations. His brother was Lodovico Valmarana (1926–2018), Count of Valmarana and Nogara, whose father Count Andrea Valmarana (1891–1976) purchased the villa in 1912, with the villa now owned by Lodovico's son, Count Nicolò Valmarana. The interior is open to the public Friday through Sunday, and the grounds are open every day.

== Film ==
In 1979 the American film director Joseph Losey filmed Wolfgang Amadeus Mozart's opera Don Giovanni in Villa La Rotonda and the Veneto region of Italy. The film was nominated for several César Awards in 1980 including Best Director, and has generally been praised as one of the finer cinematic adaptations of opera.

== Photo gallery ==
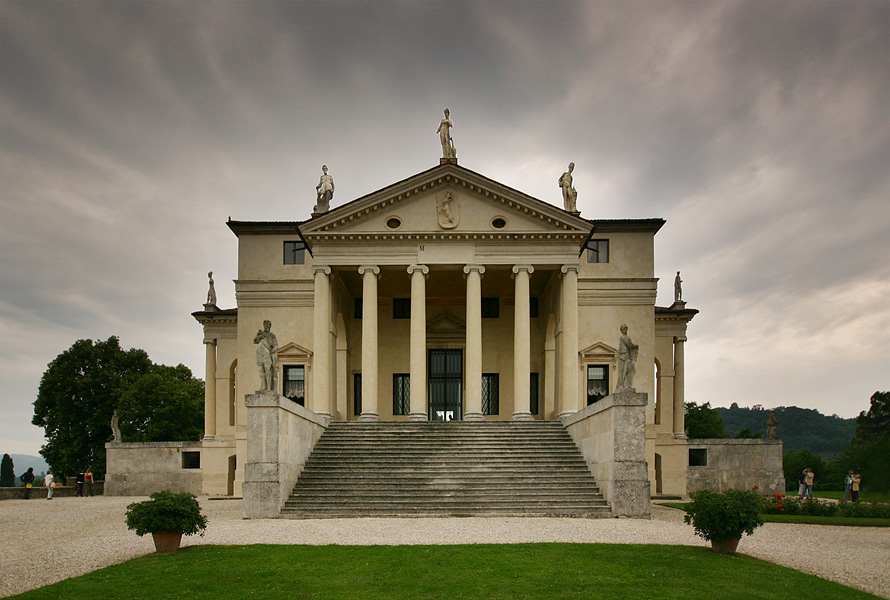
Front

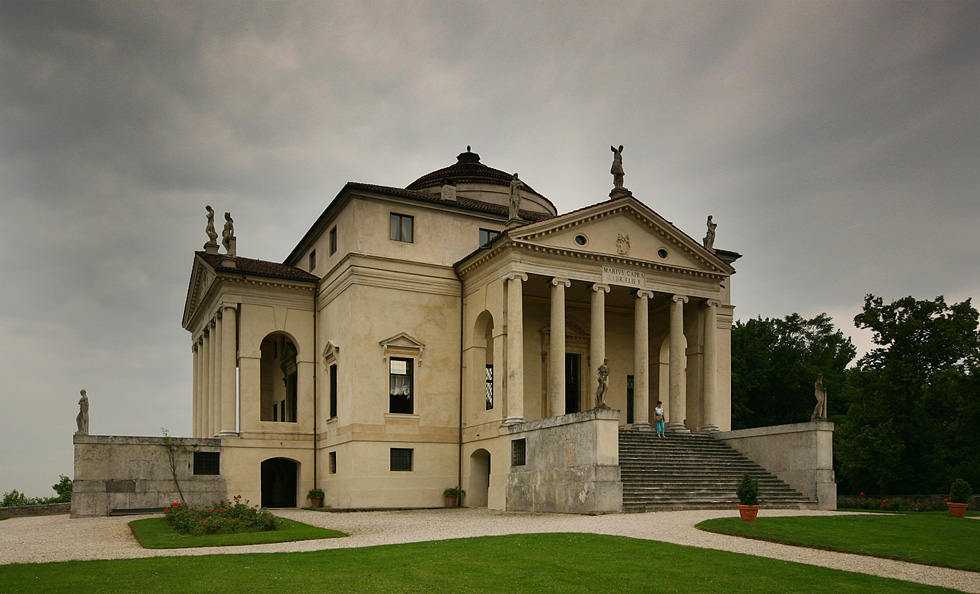
Side

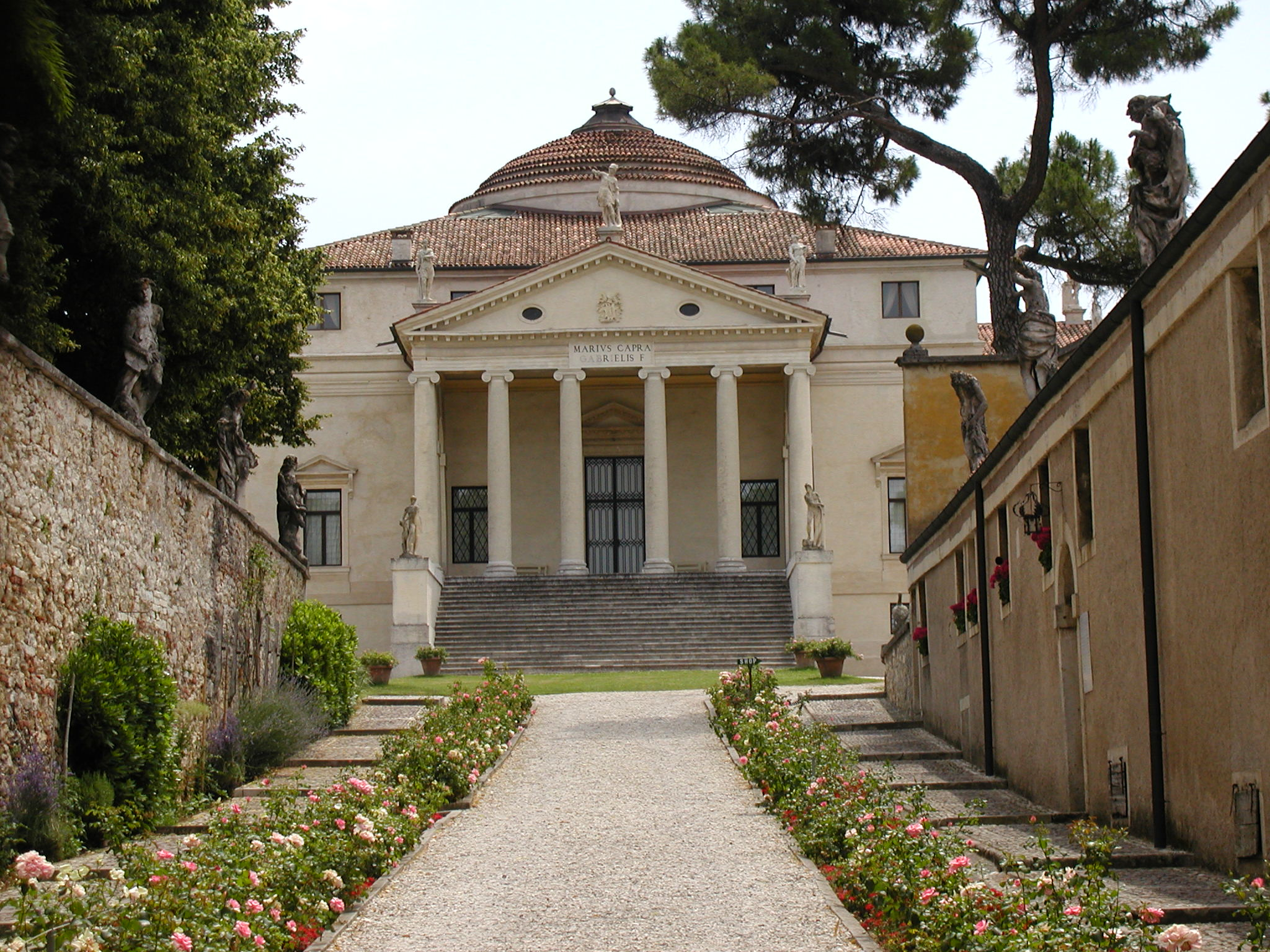
Service corridor leading up to building façade

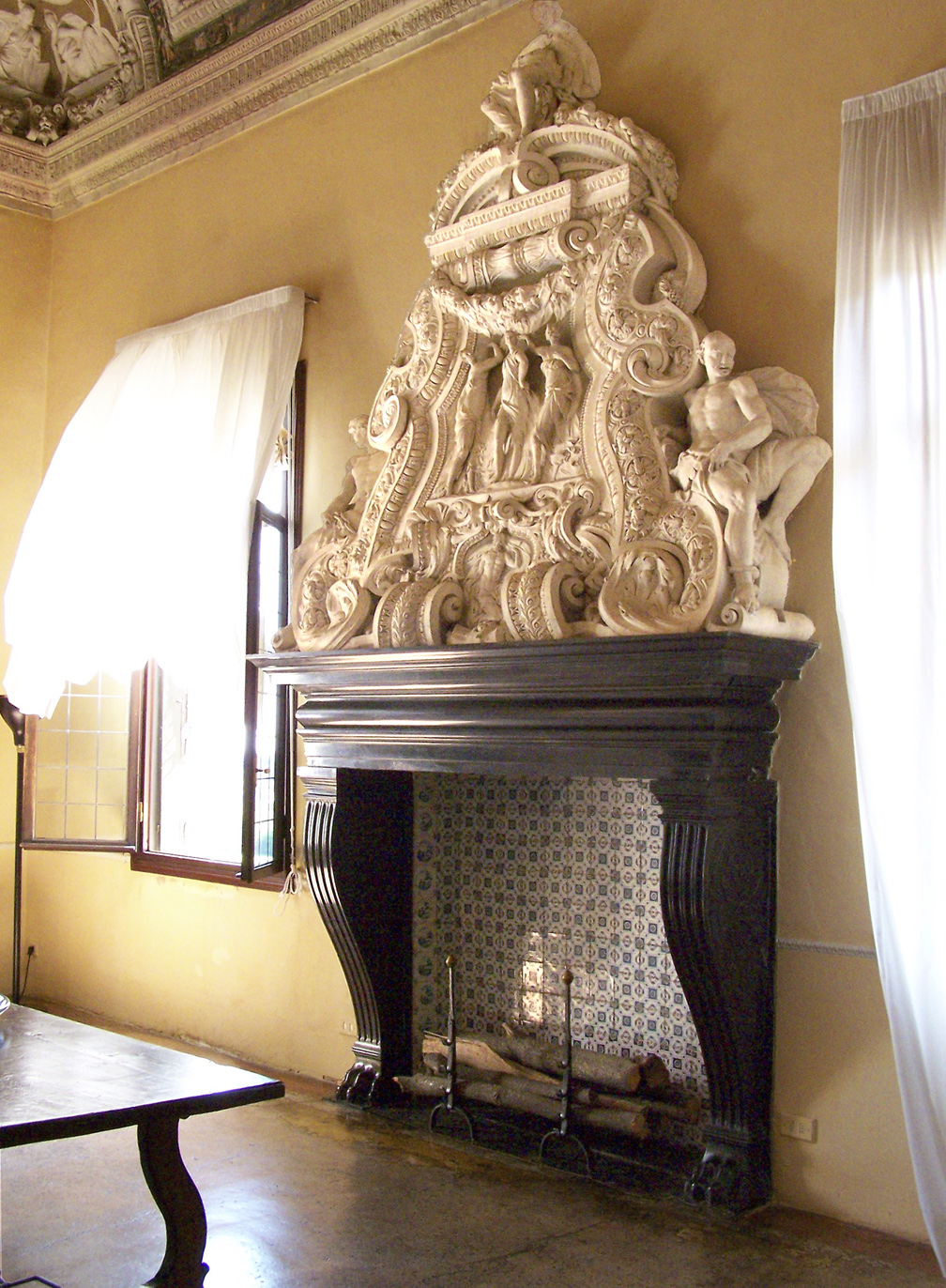
carved marble fireplace mantel over a fireplace

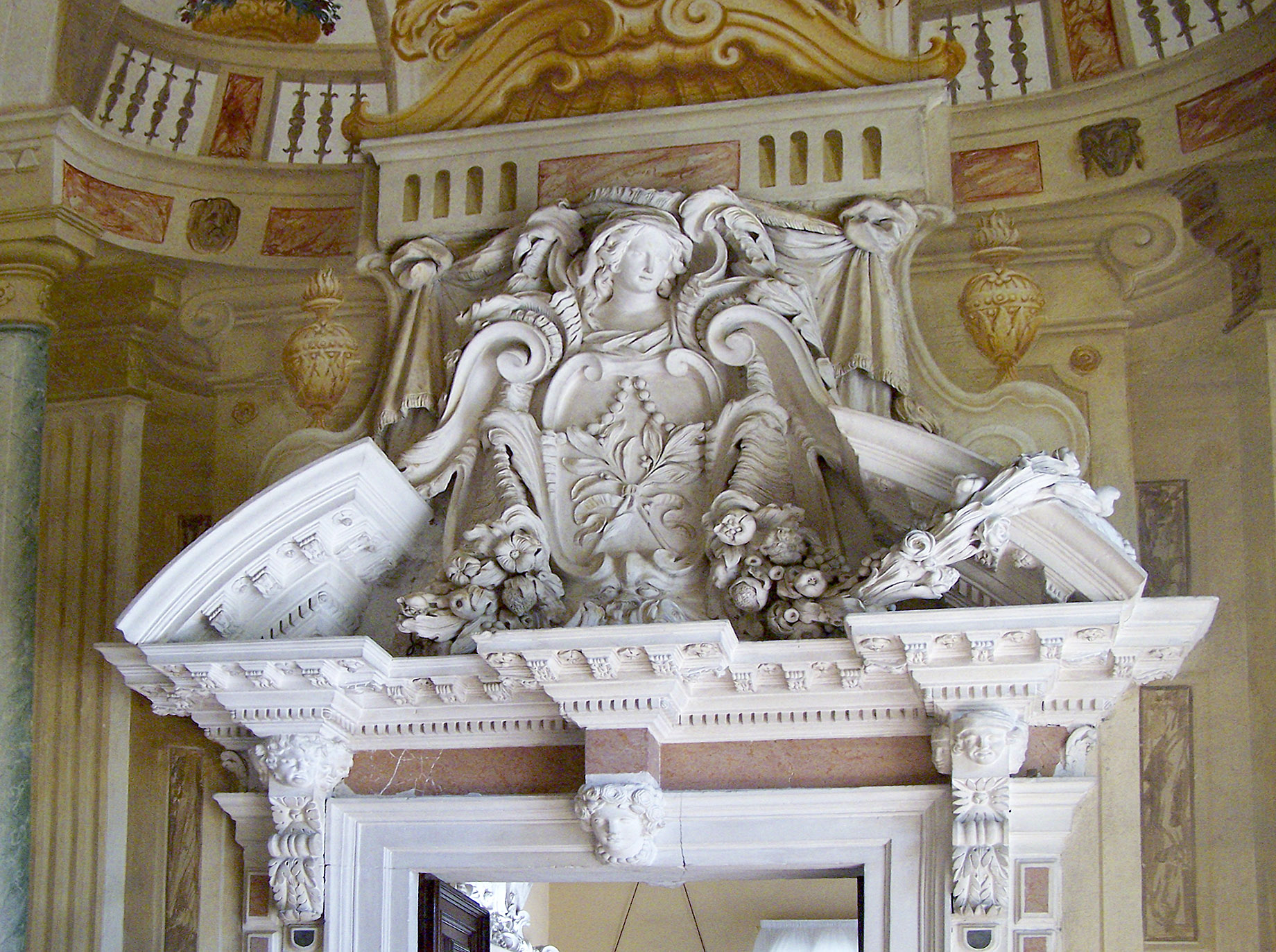
Open pediment over doorway

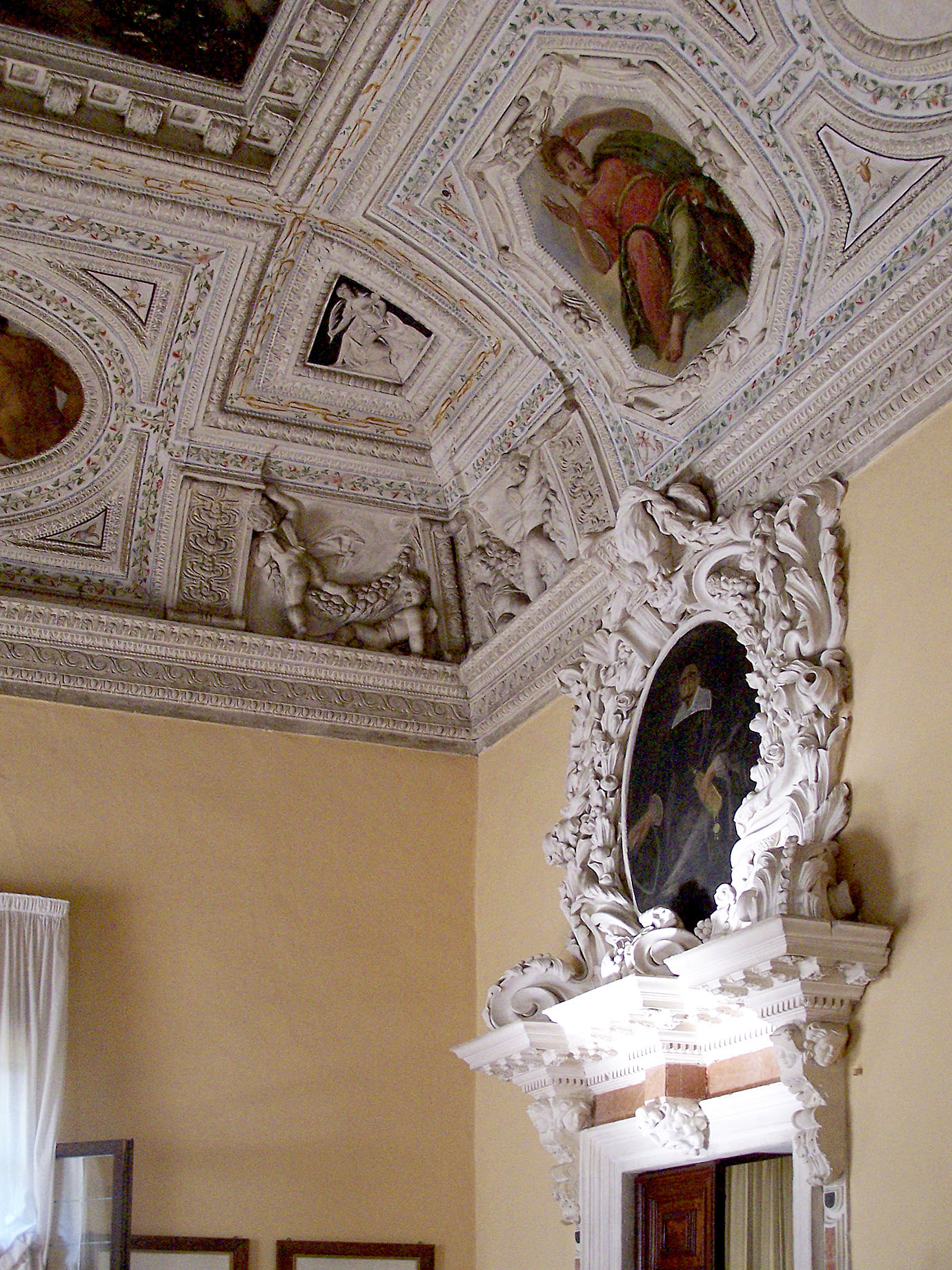
Ornamental moldings and fresco painting

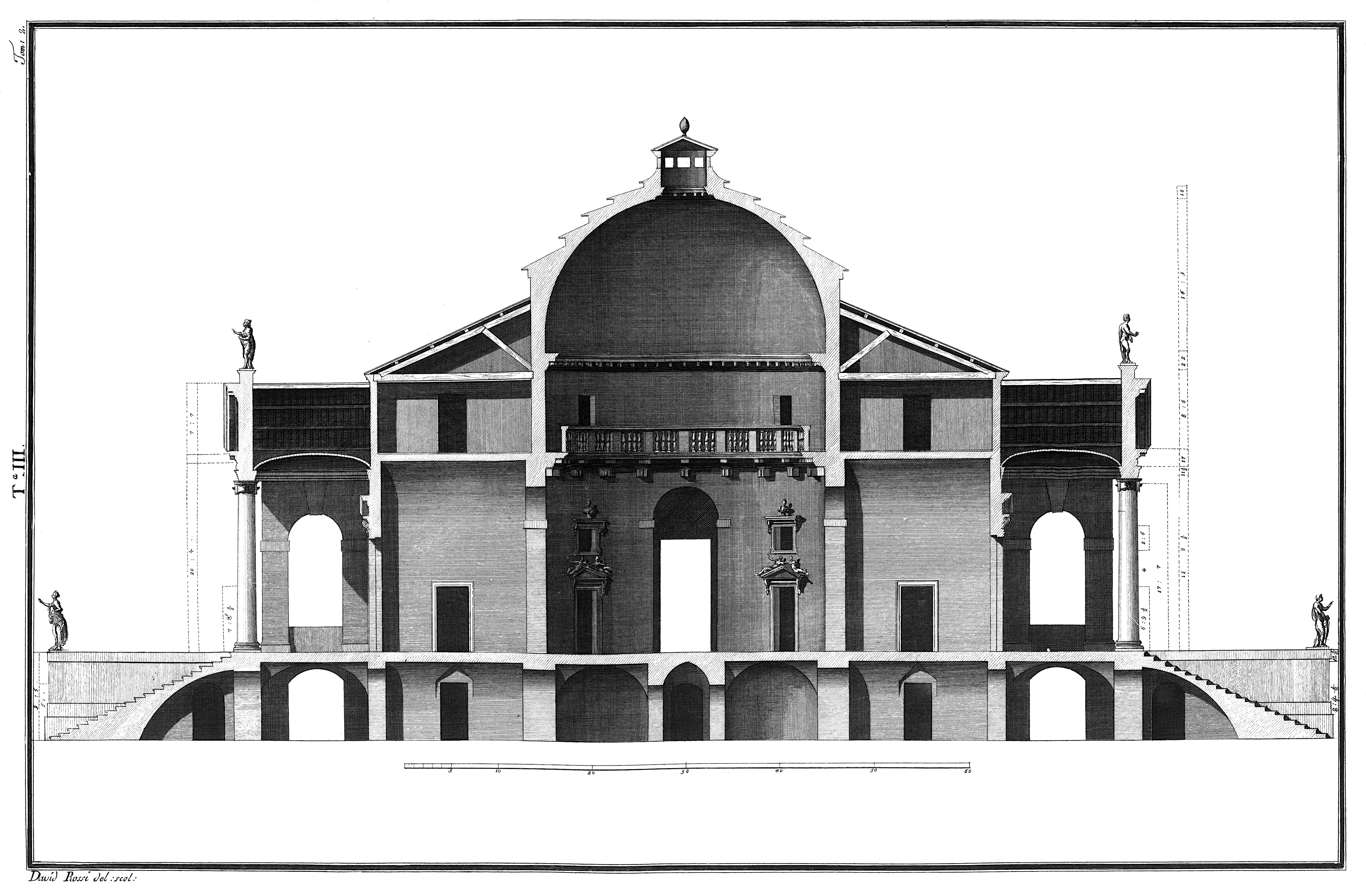
Palladio: I quattro libri

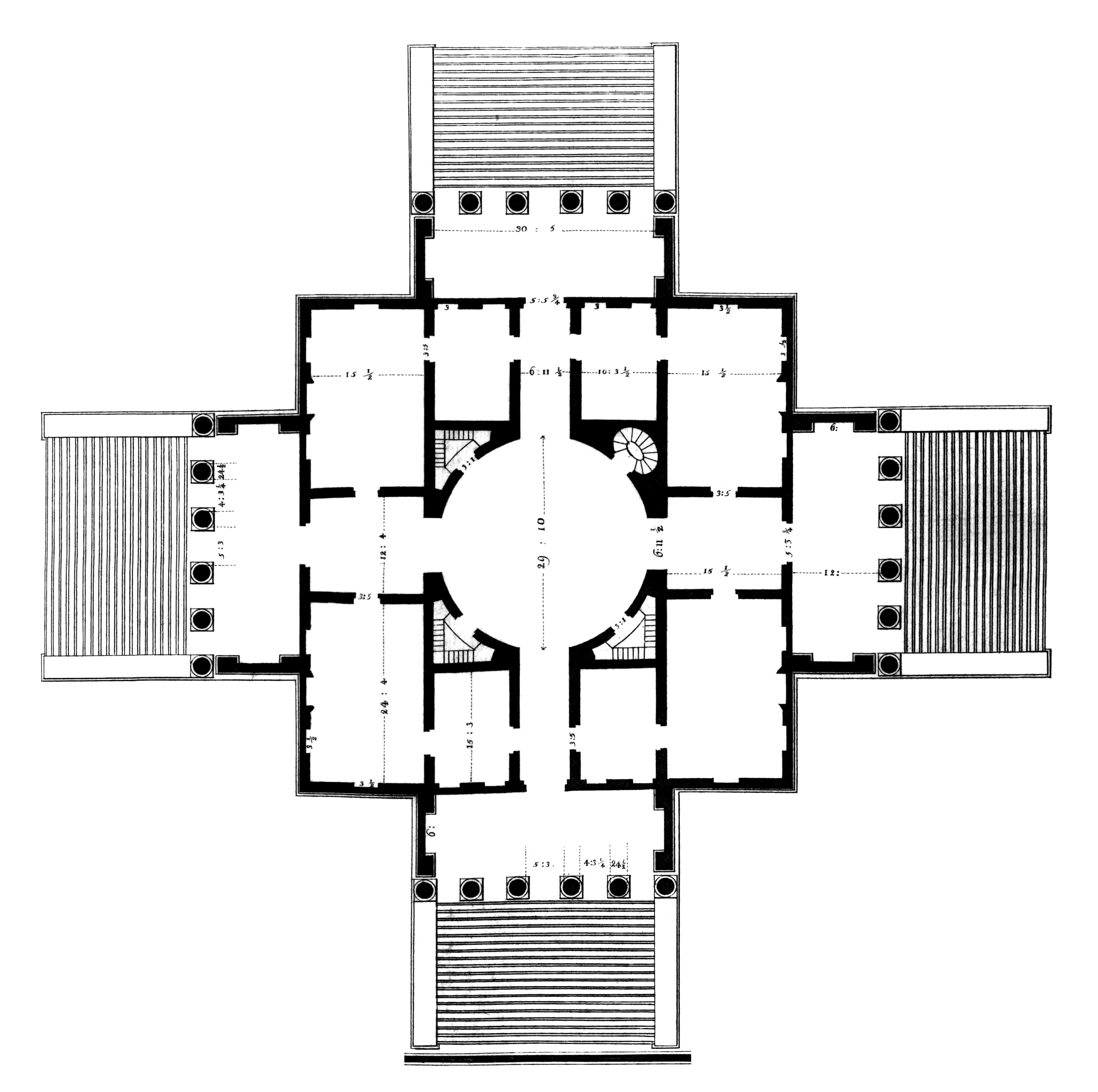
Palladio: I quattro libri

== Influences ==
=== England ===
Five houses have been built in England based on Palladio's Villa Rotonda: Henbury Hall, Cheshire, is the most recent; Chiswick House, Greater London, and Mereworth Castle, Kent, are protected as listed buildings; Foots Cray Place, Kent, and Nuthall Temple, Nottinghamshire have been demolished. One of the earliest Palladian villas in the north of England is Rokeby Park.

=== Palestinian Territories ===
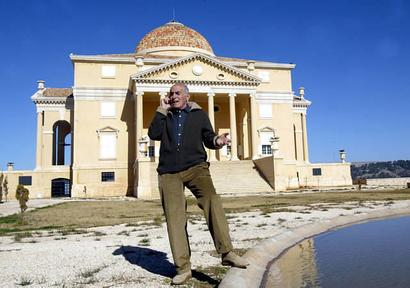
The "House of Palestine" and owner Munib al-Masri in Nabulus.

The "House of Palestine" (Bayt al-Filastin), built at the top of biblical Mount Gerizim, which towers over the Palestinian city of Nablus, north of Jerusalem, closely resembles the Villa Rotonda. It is owned by Palestinian millionaire Munib al-Masri.

=== Poland ===
Palaces built in Poland based on Palladio's Villa Rotonda include the Królikarnia (Rabbit House) Palace, the Belweder in Warsaw and the Skórzewski Palace in Lubostroń.

=== Belarus ===
The interior of the main building of the Gomel Palace in Gomel in the Eastern Belarus is based on Villa Rotonda.

=== Ukraine ===
The Cathedral of Transfiguration of Bolgrad in southwestern Ukraine, designed by architect Avraam Melnikov and built in 1833–1838, is inspired by Villa Rotonda.

=== United States ===
For the competition to design the President's House in Washington, DC, Thomas Jefferson anonymously submitted a design that was a variation on the Villa Rotonda. Though James Hoban's Palladian design for what would become known as the White House was selected, the influence of the Villa Rotonda can also be seen at Jefferson's own iconic home of Monticello.

The Calcasieu Parish Courthouse, finished in 1912 in Lake Charles, Louisiana, is a copy of the Villa La Rotonda

== See also ==
- Palladian architecture
- 16th-century Western domes
- Valmarana family

== Sources ==
- dal Lago, Adalbert (1969). Villas and Palaces of Europe. Paul Hamlyn, ISBN 978-0-600-01235-1.
