= Dobrzyca =

- Town
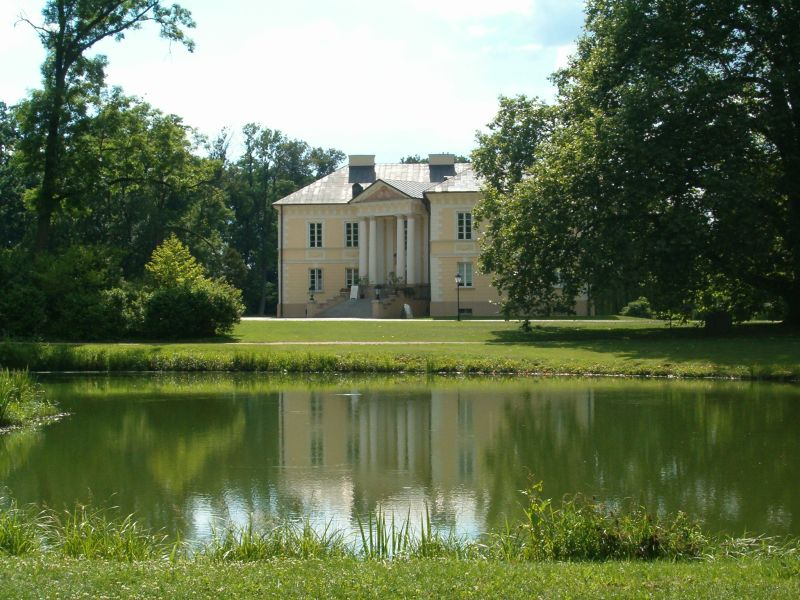
- The museum, palace and park complex

- Flag Coat of arms

- Location within Poland
- Coordinates: 51°51′54″N 17°36′7″E
- Country: Poland
- Voivodeship: Greater Poland
- County: Pleszew
- Gmina: Dobrzyca
- First mentioned: 1327
- Town rights: 1440 or earlier

Government
  - Mayor: Jarosław Pietrzak
- Area: 19.7 km^{2} (7.6 sq mi)
- Elevation: 132 m (433 ft)
- Population (31 December 2021): 3,101
  - Density: 157/km^{2} (408/sq mi)
- Time zone: UTC+1 (CET)
  - Summer (DST): UTC+2 (CEST)
- Postal code: 63-330
- Area code: +48 62
- Car plates: PPL
- Website: gminadobrzyca.pl

Dobrzyca [dɔˈbʐɨt͡sa] is a town in Pleszew County, Greater Poland Voivodeship, in west-central Poland. It is the seat of the gmina (administrative district) called Gmina Dobrzyca. As of December 2021, the town has a population of 3,101.

== History ==
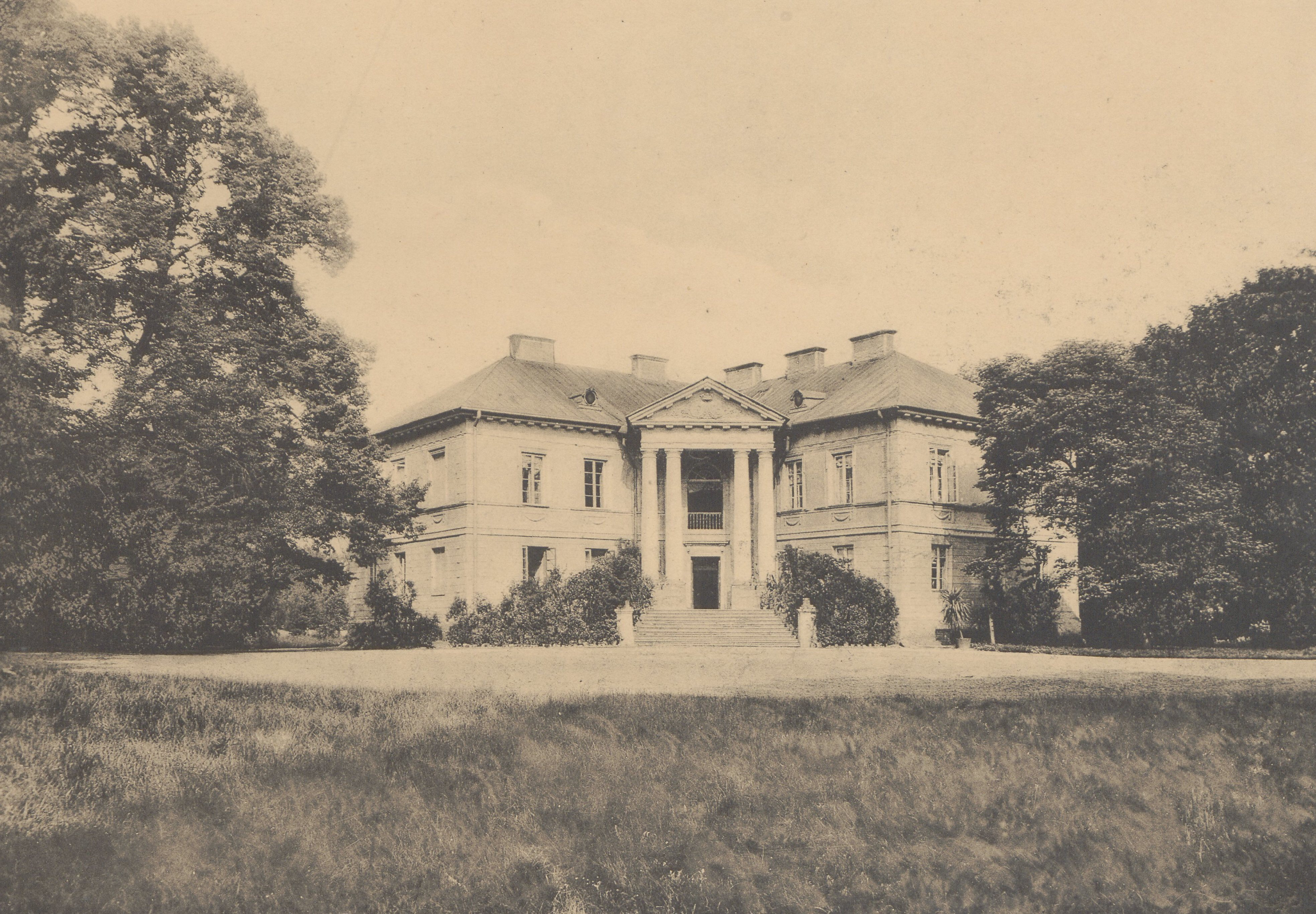
Gorzeński Palace in the early 20th century

As part of the region of Greater Poland, i.e. the cradle of the Polish state, the area formed part of Poland since its establishment in the 10th century. The first written mention of Dobrzyca dates to 1327, when the noble Mikołaj Dobrzycki took possession of the town. In 1440, King Władysław III of Warna granted town privileges to the community. Dobrzyca was a private town, administratively located in the Kalisz County in the Kalisz Voivodeship in the Greater Poland Province.

Dobrzyca was destroyed by Swedish troops during the Swedish invasion of 1655–1660. In 1655, Hetman Jerzy Sebastian Lubomirski led an aristocratic rebellion against King John II Casimir Vasa, using Dobrzyca as a staging area. The rebels had a victory over the royal troops at Częstochowa, but later they withdrew to Greater Poland. The small town had, in the 18th century, no more than 1,000 inhabitants. In 1717, wealthy landed aristocrat Aleksander Gorzeński acquired the town. His grandchild was General Augustyn Gorzeński, aide to King Stanislaus II August Poniatowski, Sejm (Polish parliament) delegate and participant in the development of the Constitution of May 3, 1791, which provided stimulation of the urban economy in 1772.

After the second partition of Poland, Dobrzyca came under Prussian rule in 1793. Following the successful Greater Poland uprising of 1806, it was regained by Poles and included within the short-lived Duchy of Warsaw. After the duchy's dissolution, in 1815, it was re-annexed by Prussia. Over the 19th century, there were several rulers and in 1890, the bibliophile Count Zygmunt Czarnecki took over. The town remained the family estate of the Czarnecki family until 1939. The counts connected the town to the railway, increased agriculture and created an agricultural bank. The return to the newly re-formed country of Poland in 1918 brought the establishment of further cooperatives and associations. Stanisław Mikołajczyk, Sejm delegate and later prime minister of the Polish government-in-exile while it was headquartered in London, was baptised in the town. Dobrzyca lost its town status in 1934, but regained it on 1 January 2014.

After the German occupation of Poland during the Second World War, housing cooperatives developed allowing the palace, which had become the town hall, to be converted into a museum. From 1975 to 1998 the town belonged to Kalisz Voivodeship.

== Sites of interest ==
The Gorzeński Palace and the park are tourist destinations in Dobrzyca. Similar palace designs are in numerous in other places in Poland such as Gołuchów, 20 km east of Dobrzyca, and another at Śmiełów to the north, where a palace was built by the same aristocratic family.

=== Palace ===
The palace of Augustyn Gorzeński, designed by Stanisław Zawadzki, was built between 1795 and 1799. It is early classical architecture, which exhibits some late Baroque style characteristics inside. Externally, it combines traditional structural elements of a Polish aristocratic seat with double wings and Freemason symbolism.

In 1940 to 1941, after the evacuation of the countess Czarnecka and her daughters, the palace was used as a grain storehouse, which contributed to the destruction of the parquet floors. In the postwar years the building served as a primary school. In 1988 it was given over to the National Museum; in 1990 it was restored under a public-private partnership.

=== Landscape garden ===
The landscaped park is noteworthy; it was developed at the beginning of the 19th century in the English style. It covers two river courses as well as several ponds and channels. The pavilion represents the Roman Pantheon. On an artificial island, there is a summerhouse and exotic plants, and a monopteros rises from one of the ponds.

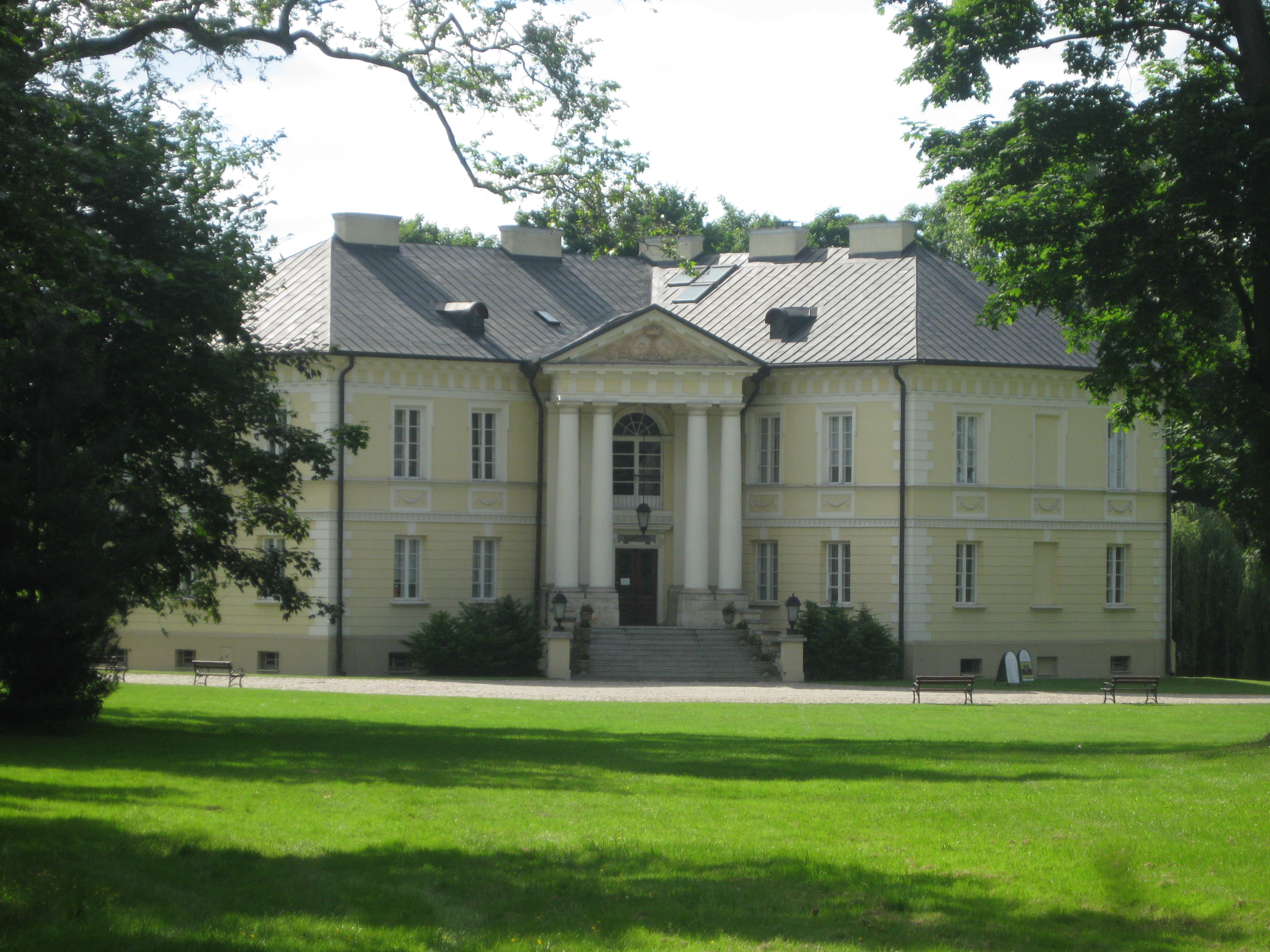
The Gorzeński Palace, now a museum, in Dobrzyca.

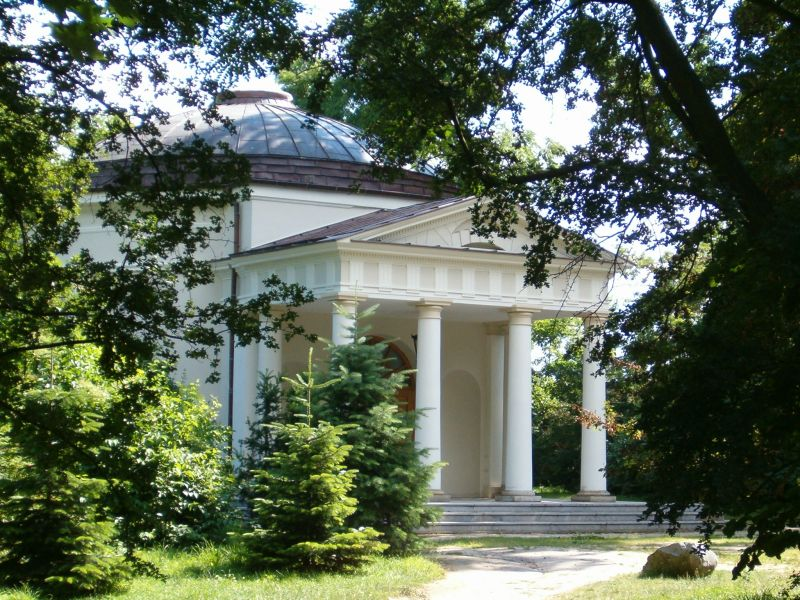
Pantheon in the Park

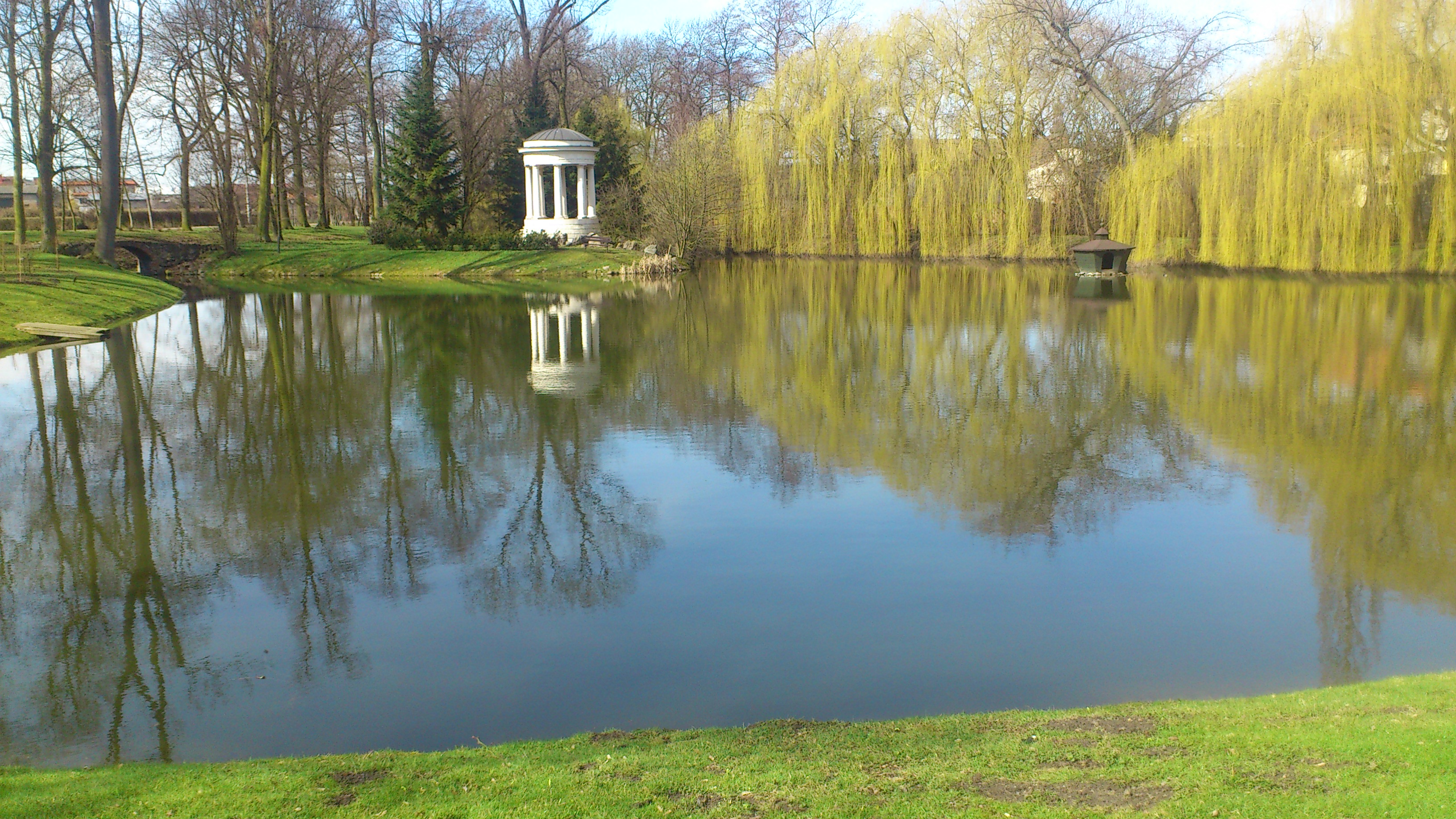
Park and monopteros

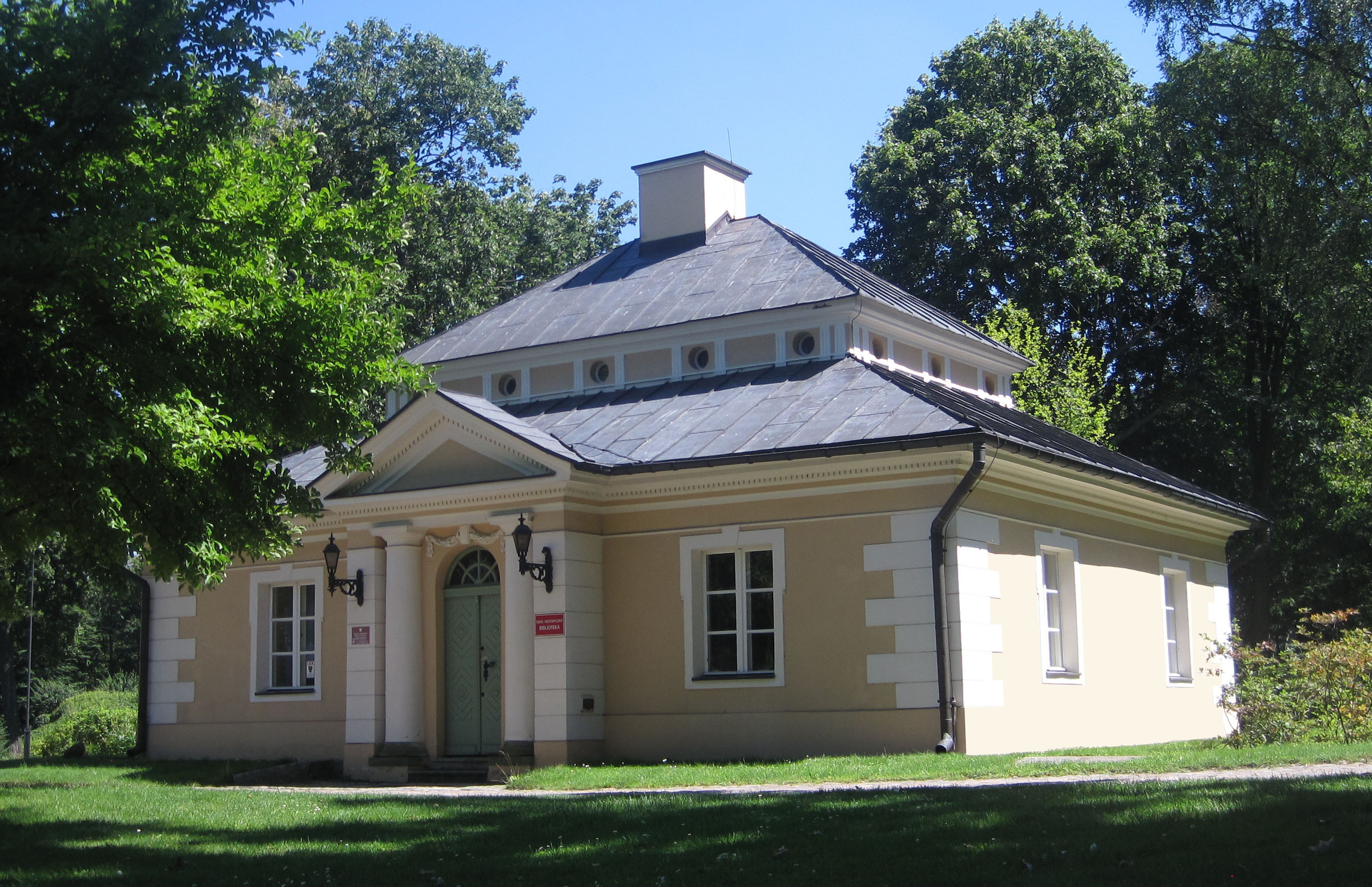
Gardener's house, now a library

== Notable people ==
- Sergiusz Prusak (born 1979), born here
