= Lubostroń =

- Village
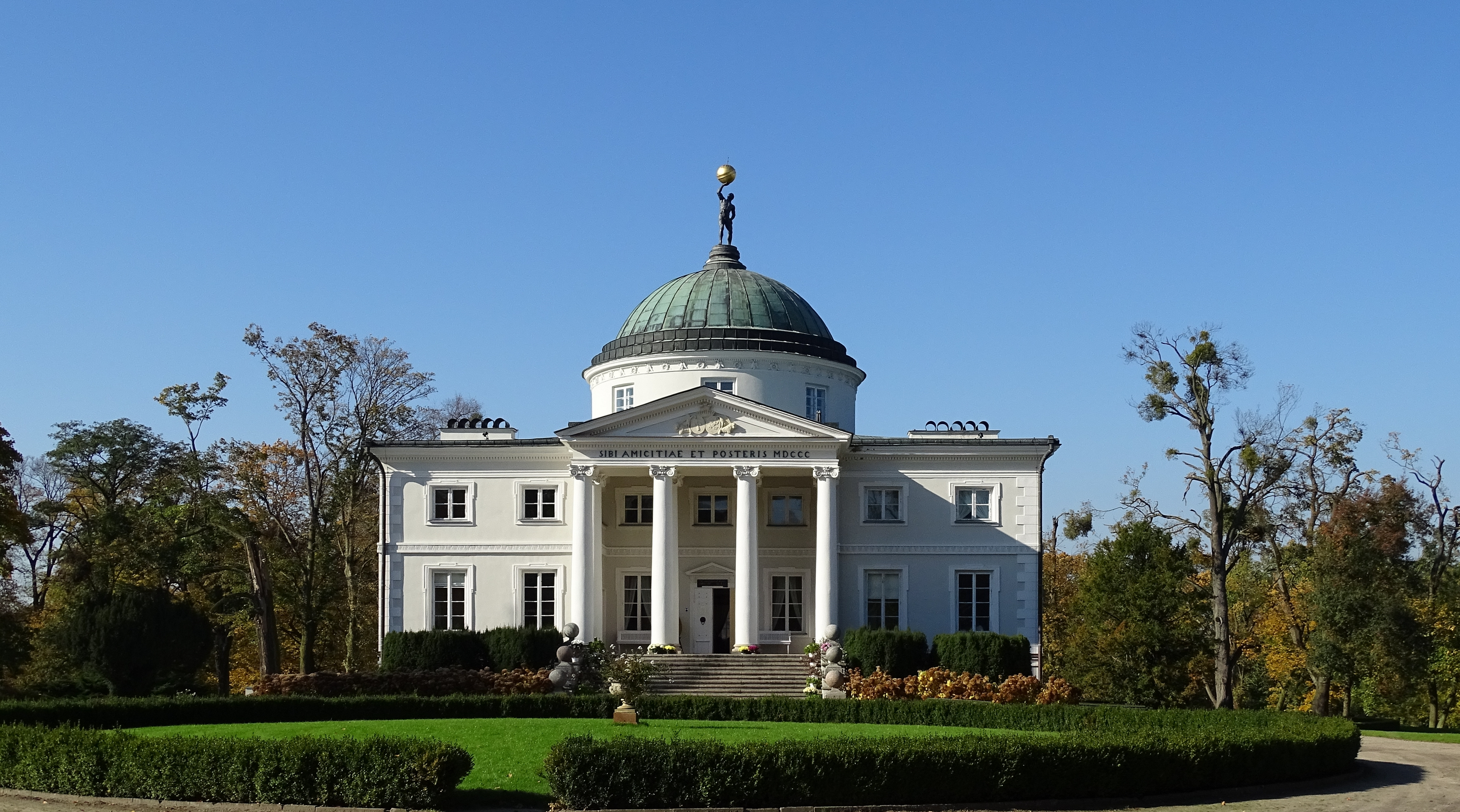
- Skórzewski Palace

- Location within Poland
- Coordinates: 52°54′N 17°53′E
- Country: Poland
- Voivodeship: Kuyavian-Pomeranian
- County: Żnin
- Gmina: Łabiszyn

Population
  - Total: 790
- Time zone: UTC+1 (CET)
  - Summer (DST): UTC+2 (CEST)
- Vehicle registration: CZN

Lubostroń [luˈbɔstrɔɲ] is a village in the administrative district of Gmina Łabiszyn, within Żnin County, Kuyavian-Pomeranian Voivodeship, in north-central Poland.

The village is the location of Skórzewski Palace designed by the leading Polish classicist, Stanisław Zawadzki, in 1800, a listed Historic Monument of Poland.
