= Stanisław Zawadzki =

Polish architect

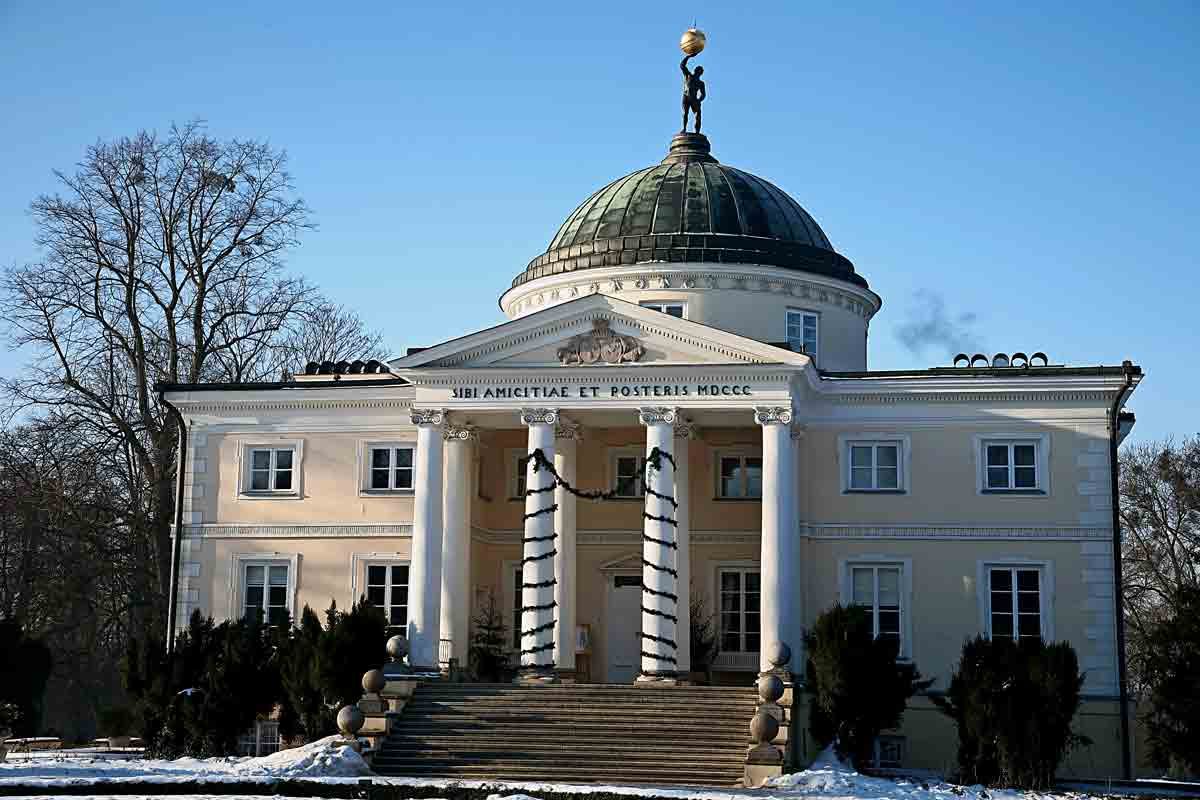
Palace in Lubostroń

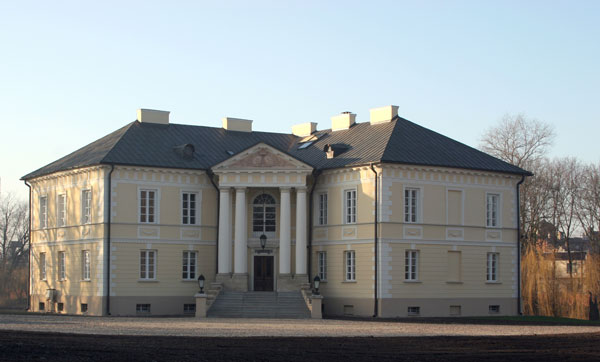
Palace in Dobrzyca

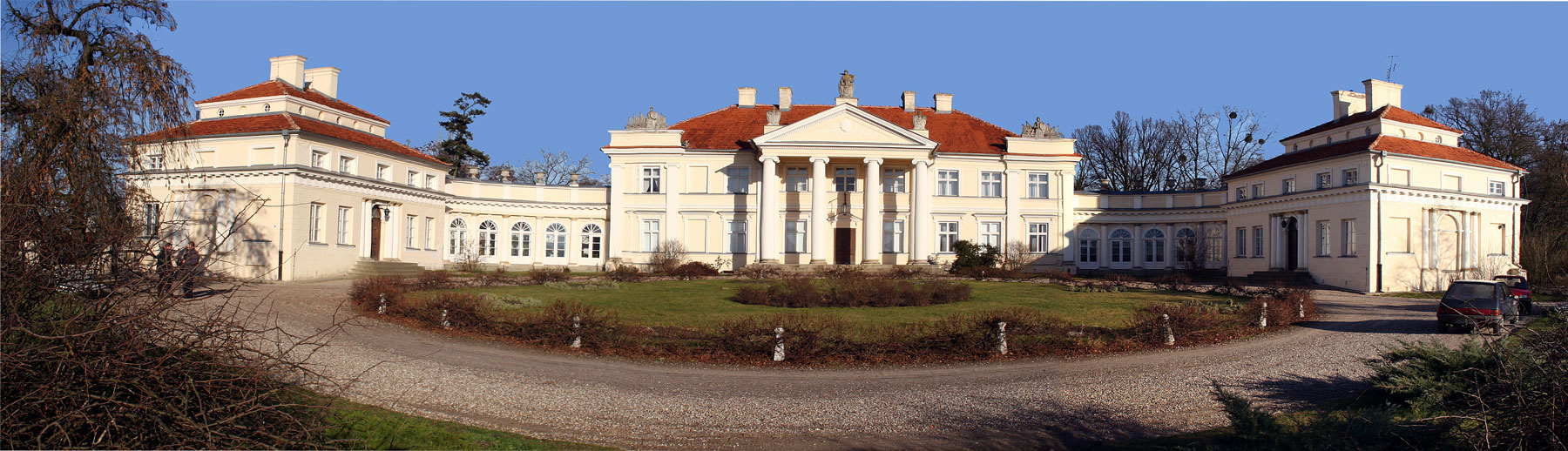
Palace in Śmiełów

Stanisław Zawadzki (1743–1806) was a Polish architect, representative of late-baroque and classicism, inclined towards Palladian architecture and precursor of the empire style in Polish architecture, Major General of the Army of Polish–Lithuanian Commonwealth.

Author of palaces in Śmiełów (1797), Dobrzyca (1799), Lubostroń (1800), defensive buildings, military buildings in Kamieniec Podolski and Warsaw.

== Biography ==
Zawadzki was born in 1743 in Warsaw. He graduated in St. Luke Academy in Rome. In 1769 he became a professor and in 1776 an honorable member of the academy.

He died on October 19, 1806, in Warsaw.
