= Śmiełów =

- Settlement
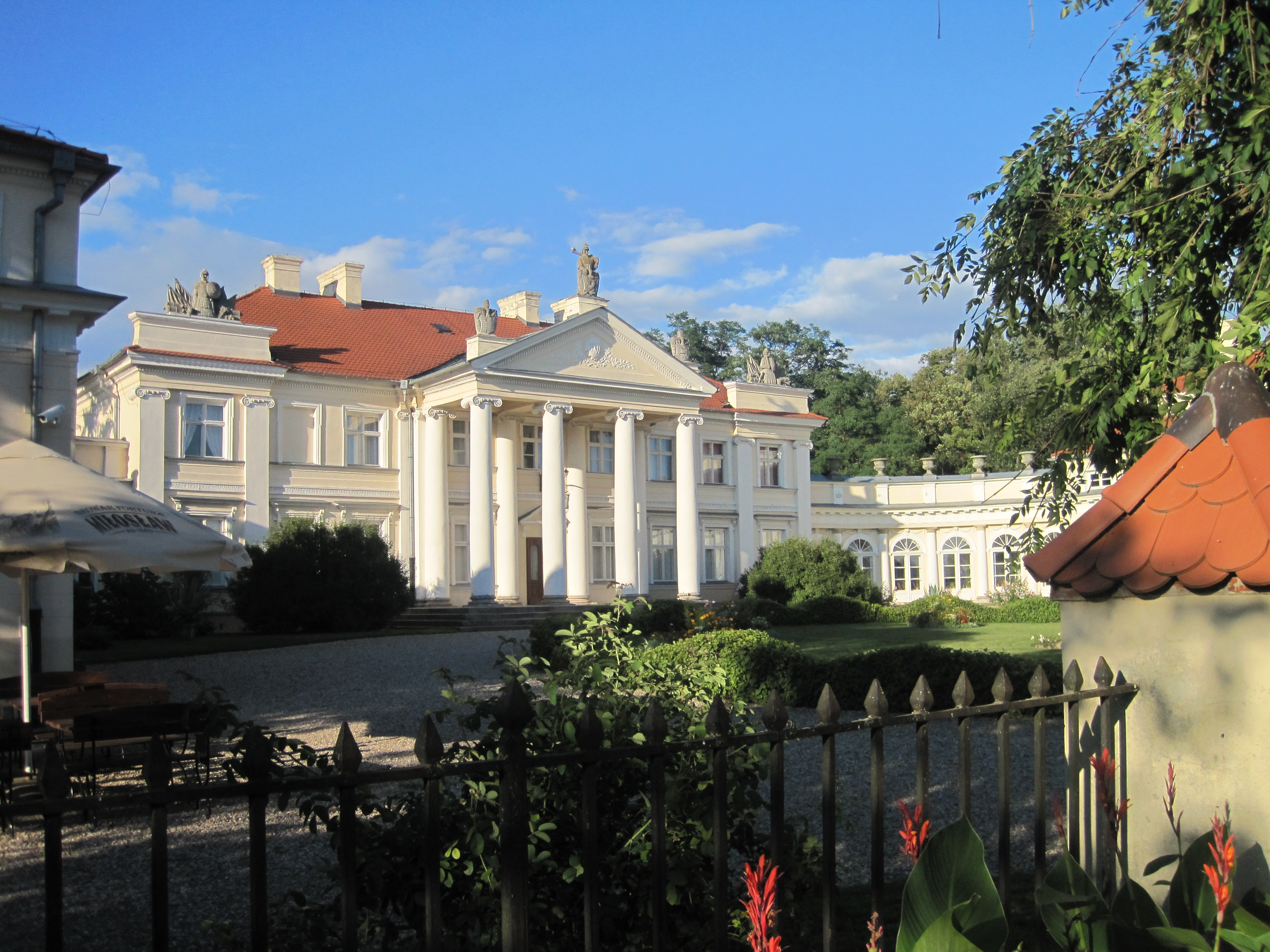
- Śmiełów Palace

- Location within Poland
- Coordinates: 52°6′N 17°34′E
- Country: Poland
- Voivodeship: Greater Poland
- County: Jarocin
- Gmina: Żerków

Śmiełów [ˈɕmjɛwuf] is a settlement in the administrative district of Gmina Żerków, within Jarocin County, Greater Poland Voivodeship, in west-central Poland.

Śmiełów is famous for the only Polish museum devoted to Adam Mickiewicz, Polish national poet, who stayed in the village for few weeks in late summer of 1831. Museum is located in the classical-Palladian palace, designed by the leading Polish classicist, Stanisław Zawadzki in 1797. The palace is believed to be one of the greatest examples of neo-classical architecture in Poland.
