= JDI =

JDI may refer to:

- J. D. Irving
- Japan Display Inc
- Jaring Data Interaktif
- Java Debugger Interface
- Job Descriptive Index
- Job's Daughters International
- Jugend debattiert international
- Just Do It
- Just Detention International
- UCL Jill Dando Institute
