= Piotr Lisiewicz =

Polish journalist and publicist

- Born: 24 July 1972 (age 53); Poznań, Poland
- Education: Dąbrówka High School in Poznań
- Occupations: Journalist; columnist; op-ed writer
- Years active: 1991–present
- Employer(s): Gazeta Polska, Niezależna Gazeta Polska, Telewizja Republika
- Known for: Conservative political commentary in Poland

Piotr Lisiewicz (born 24 July 1972) is a Polish political activist, journalist, press and television columnist.

== Career ==
Lisiewicz was born on July 24, 1972, in Poznań. In 1991, he graduated from the Dąbrówka High School in Poznań. While studying at Dąbrówka, he was one of the founders of "Naszość", an independent anti-communist zine copied on a photocopier. The journalist was associated with the hooligan community centered around the Lech Poznań football club.

Lisiewicz actively participated in the happenings organized by the "Naszość" movement against the Democratic Left Alliance party. In 2002, he was accused of misleading a police officer about his identity by claiming to be Vladimir Ilyich Lenin.

Since his high school days, Lisiewicz's activities were associated with the publishers of the weekly "Gazeta Polska". He became head of the national section of this magazine. In the "Gazeta Polska", Lisiewicz publishes, among other things, full-page columns of political satire and a column called "Okiem Lenina" (Through Lenin's Eye), in which he includes quotes from the writings of the Bolshevik leader or other quotations related to this figure. Until 2009, he collaborated with the monthly "Niezależna Gazeta Polska", and since 2009 he has been publishing in its successor "Niezależna Gazeta Polska – Nowe Państwo". He also published on the Polish opinion-forming website Niezalezna.pl

Since 2013, he has been hosting the program "Kulisy manipulacji" (Behind the Scenes of Manipulation) on Telewizja Republika, together with Katarzyna Gójska. Since 2016, he has been hosting the program "Wywiad z chuliganem" (Interview with a Hooligan). The journalist invites Polish anti-communist activists and contemporary representatives of the opposition—broadly defined as 'the uncompromising'— to take part in the discussion. Previously, the program was co-produced by Radio Poznań and made available on the YouTube platform. From 2022 to 2024 he was one of the hosts of the afternoon current affairs programme "Wolne Głosy". Since 2024, he has been one of the hosts of the evening television program "Piachem w tryby" (Sand in the Modes), which is a kind of satirical summary of the events of the day.

Lisiewicz is also an activist of the Komitet Wolny Kaukaz (Free Caucasus Committee).

== Private life ==
Piotr Lisiewicz is the brother of Paweł Lisiewicz, head of the Cabinet of the President of the Republic of Poland during the presidency of Bronisław Komorowski in 2010–2015. The journalist is married to Sylwia. They have a daughter, Janina, and a son, Władysław.
