= Luisenschule (Posen) =

Polish private school

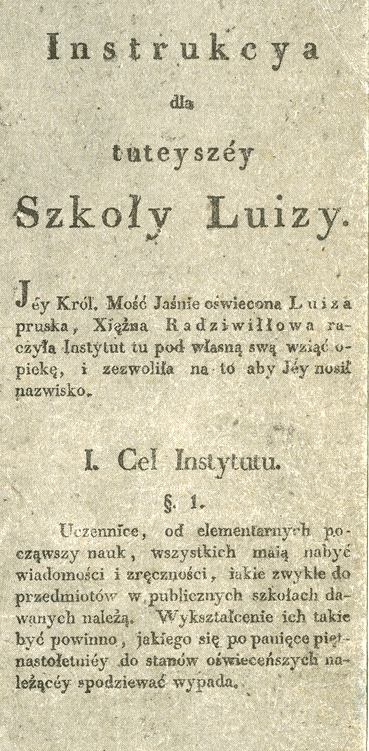
First Luisenschule rulebook

Luisenschule (initially in Polish: Szkoła Luizy, later in Polish: Szkoła Ludwiki) was a female school, open in Posen in the years of 1830–1919. Until 1873 it was operated as a private establishment, managed by the Luisenstiftung foundation; afterwards it was incorporated into the official Prussian education system. Its prestigious character attracted girls from high- and mid-range bourgeoisie; the school was particularly recognized for teaching music and arts in general. Since 1841 Luisenschule operated jointly with Lehrerinnen-Seminar, female teachers' seminar. The school was designed as a German-Polish institution, though since the mid-19th century the Polish ingredient went into decline; by the end of the century Luisenschule pursued a militantly patriotic Prussian education model. Periodically Jews formed a significant fraction of the girls. Luisenschule students who became public figures in the realm of German politics, science and arts were Auguste Schmidt, Ida Barber, Elise Ekke, Margarete Gerhardt and Hedwig Landsberg. The best known Polish graduate was Walentyna Motty, later wife of Hipolit Cegielski.

== Beginnings ==
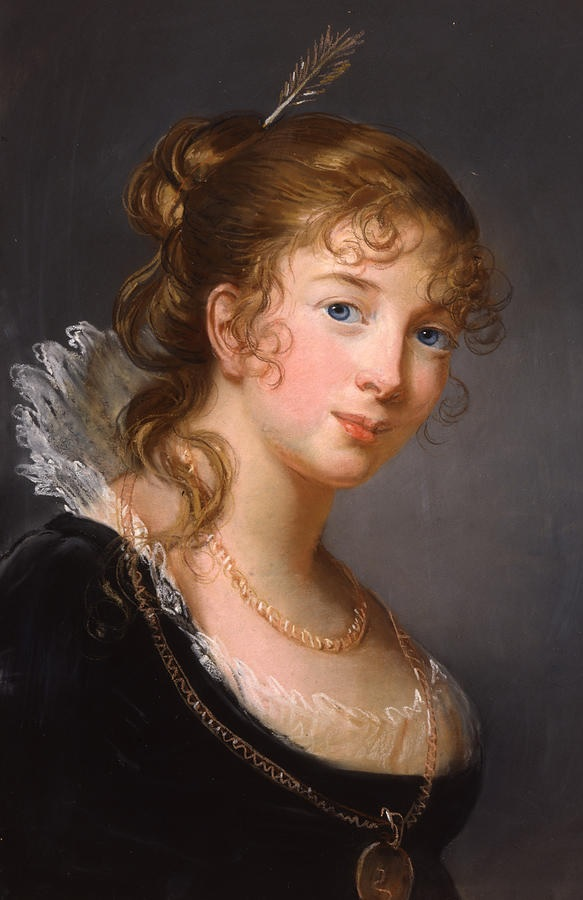
Princess Louise

There were a few private schooling establishments for girls, operational in Posen in the early 19th century; some offered advanced curriculum but proved short-lived, while the others did not meet expectations of the local landed gentry and the growing urban bourgeoisie. In the late 1820s some of the Posen wealthy approached local administration about setting up a well-grounded, high-level female school. The idea was picked up by princess Louise of Prussia, wife to prince Antoni Radziwiłł, the Polish duke-governor of the Duchy of Posen. Princess Louise from her youth demonstrated sympathy for the Poles and interest in education alike; she agreed to head the project. It took shape of a private foundation, Luisenstiftung. Her contribution proved to be the financial basis of the enterprise, though other members contributed as well. In 1830 the foundation opened a school for girls, initially named Louisenschule.

The establishment was intended for girls of both German and Polish cultural background; some key documents, e.g. the rulebooks, were bilingual, though general instruction was in German. The schooling was divided into four stages, each lasting two years. Lowest admission age was 7; when completing education, the girls used to be 15–17. The curriculum was designed very broadly, with four hours of Polish language weekly; evaluation was based on a five-scale mark. Initially Luisenschule admitted 100-150 girls. Quality of education was so high that provincial authorities considered it too resemblant of that offered to males, and demanded it gets lowered. Theoretically the school was opened only to Christians and offered both Protestant and Catholic religious instruction; the headmaster was a Lutheran minister, Johan Gottlob Friedrich. Official supervision was provided by Provinzialschulkollegium, a provincial schooling board. At the very beginning Luisenschule was hosted in a building owned by a local court official Brückner and located at Breslauerstrasse. As it soon proved insufficient, in late 1830 the school moved to a rented building at the intersection of Breitestrasse and Judenstrasse, at a corner of the Market Square.

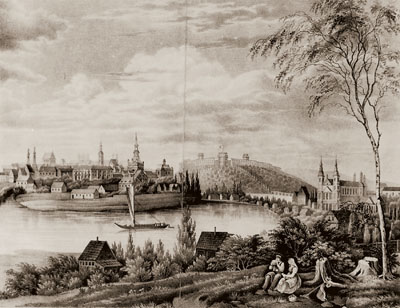
Posen, 1830s

Once Luisenstiftung found itself in financial dire straits in the mid-1830s it was rescued by a thousand-thaler donation of princess Louise. It was again the princess who approached the new duke-governor, Eduard von Flotwell, and made sure that premises taken over from the freshly secularized Benedictine order were granted to the foundation; in 1836 Luisenschule moved into the Gorka-Palace at Wasserstrasse, at that time at another corner of the Market Square. The foundation board carried out major refurbishment works, currently criticized by historians; of little value in terms of adopting the building for educational purposes, the works did away with historical architectural legacy and produced heavy financial burden for the Luisenstiftung balance sheet. However, the Radziwiłł family kept supporting the foundation until the couple left Posen in 1836.

== Private school: prosperity ==
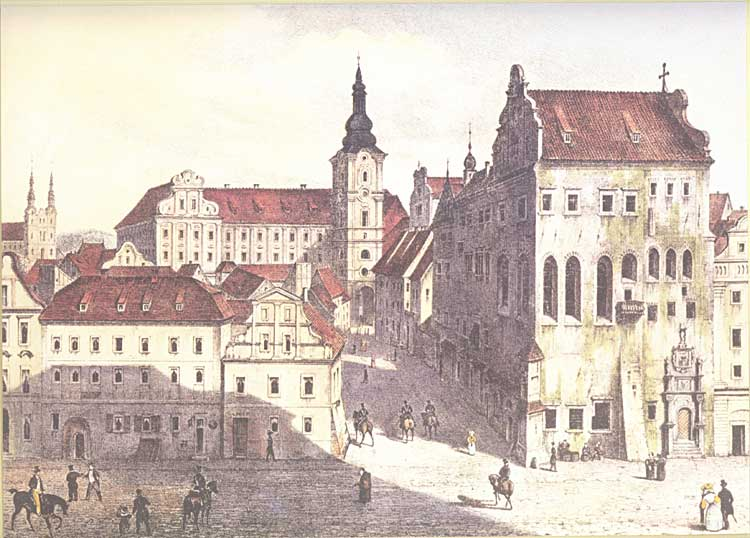
Luisenschule (right), 1840s

Once the Radziwiłł couple left the Duchy of Posen the new school headmaster, Karl Wilhelm Barth, arranged that the Luisenstiftung statute gets modified; he was greatly assisted by the schooling board of Regierungsbezirk, the provincial government. In 1837 the school was renamed to Königliche Luisenschule, while the province gained crucial role in appointing members of the foundation's board. Though technically the school remained private, the change effectively turned it into a joint, private-public establishment; from this moment onwards the decision-making process was taking place in-between Barth, the foundation and the provincial authorities. The hybrid nature was somewhat reinforced when in 1841 Luisenschule opened training courses for future teachers, heavily subsidized by the province and later to be named Lehrerinnen-Seminar. One more module, operational in the 1840s only and formatted along the same pattern, was Übungsschule, a small school serving as a practice ground for the seminarians. Luisenschule-educated governesses were very sought after.

In the mid-1840s the Poles-dominated Provinzialstände, local self-government bodies, asked that a Catholic school for girls be set up in Posen; the petition is currently seen as intended to emulate an apparently successful formula of Luisenschule, though also indicative of some anxiety about its increasingly Protestant and German nature. Despite an initially warm reception by the king, joint efforts of Barth and the schooling board led to the ultimate failure of the project. Instead, Luisenschule opened a few sections with instruction in Polish. During the revolutionary period of 1847-1848 few girls involved in Polish nationalist activities were expelled from school. Most of the Poles left shortly afterwards anyway; also some teachers, sympathetic towards the Polish national movement, moved out. Barth and some of the staff remained heavily engaged in counter-revolutionary politics, which prompted admonition on part of the schooling board chairman, Wendt. Once the latter left his post Barth emerged triumphant; the Polish classes disappeared in 1851.

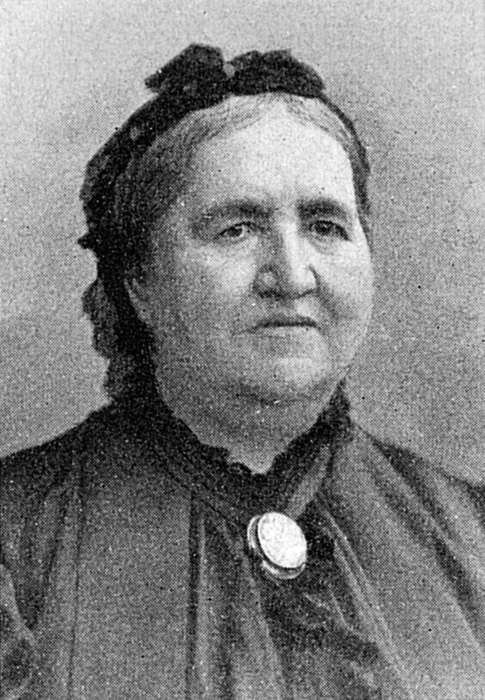
Auguste Schmidt

Personal ingenuity of Barth and opening of the teachers' seminar produced growth and expansion of Luisenschule; the number of girls grew from 200 in the early 1840s to 300 in the early 1850s; some of them, like Auguste Schmidt, later grew to public figures. Though initially the number of German students was only slightly higher than that of the Polish ones, the latter was in steady decline. More and more Jewish girls were enrolling; initially Barth tried to prevent the phenomenon, but once the Poles started leaving this policy was no longer tenable. Luisenschule dropped its numerus clausus rules, resulting in the Jews approaching 50% of all students; one of them was Ida Barber, later to be known as a novelist. The anxious Luisenstiftung board unsuccessfully tried to regain control, until in 1851 and in agreement with Regierungsbezirk the 15% limit for the Jews was brought back into force.

== Private school: crisis ==
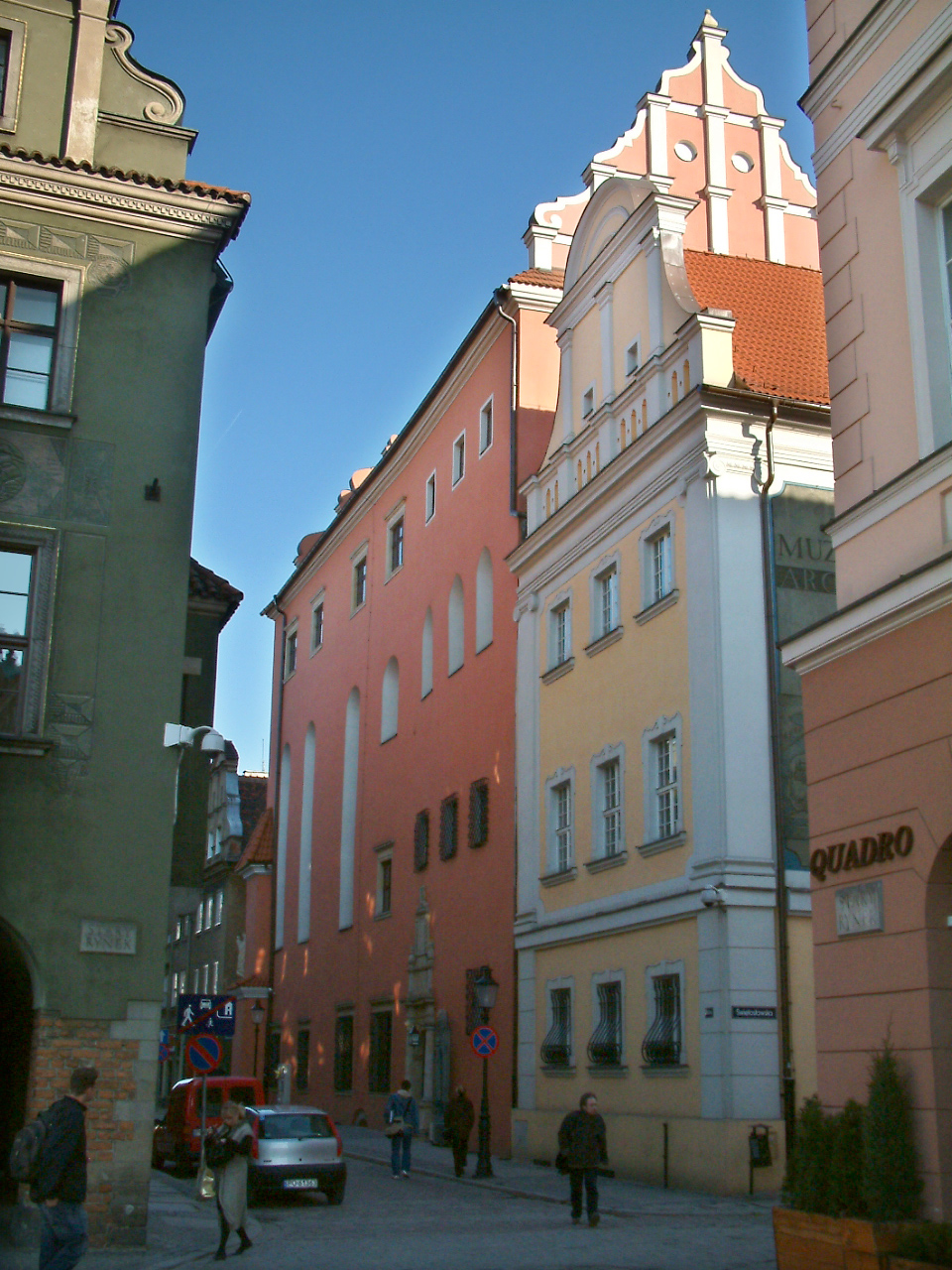
Gorka-Palace at present

Renewed numerus clausus for Jews and Polish discomfort with the school's profile reduced the number of students; in the mid-1850s hovering around 200, by the end of the decade it went even below 100. The staff experienced generational turnaround; teachers adhering to the early Luisian foundation traditions were replaced by newcomers. The factor which contributed decisively to the Luisenschule crisis was opening of two new schools for girls, set up by the Sacred Heart and Ursuline orders in the late 1850s. The conventional schools proved tough competitors, as they offered a new, modern curriculum; e.g. it included English, the subject which Barth unsuccessfully tried to introduce later on. Moreover, the schools were Catholic and the language of instruction was Polish, which lured most girls of the Polish background. Furthermore, Luisenschule lost its monopoly on training teachers, as the Ursulines launched their own seminar course in 1859.

Decreasing number of Luisenschule students produced financial problems. They were aggravated by social and economic change; the urban centre of gravity moved away from the old town and renting premises at the Gorka-Palace, the source of not marginal income for the Luisenstiftung, was no longer lucrative. In the 1860s Barth tried to address the issue by seeking further official engagement in the establishment. He requested that apart from already stable flow of subventions for Lehrerinnen-Seminar, Regierungsbezirk at least partially takes its staff on the payroll; besides, he suggested admin measures which would set the school in privileged position, in particular versus the Sacred Heart and Ursuline schools. Last but not least, Barth waged a guerilla war against the foundation board, working to transfer most of the decision-making process to the headmaster's office. The campaign proved largely successful, especially that most of the original members of the board passed away and provincial authorities did not appoint the new ones.

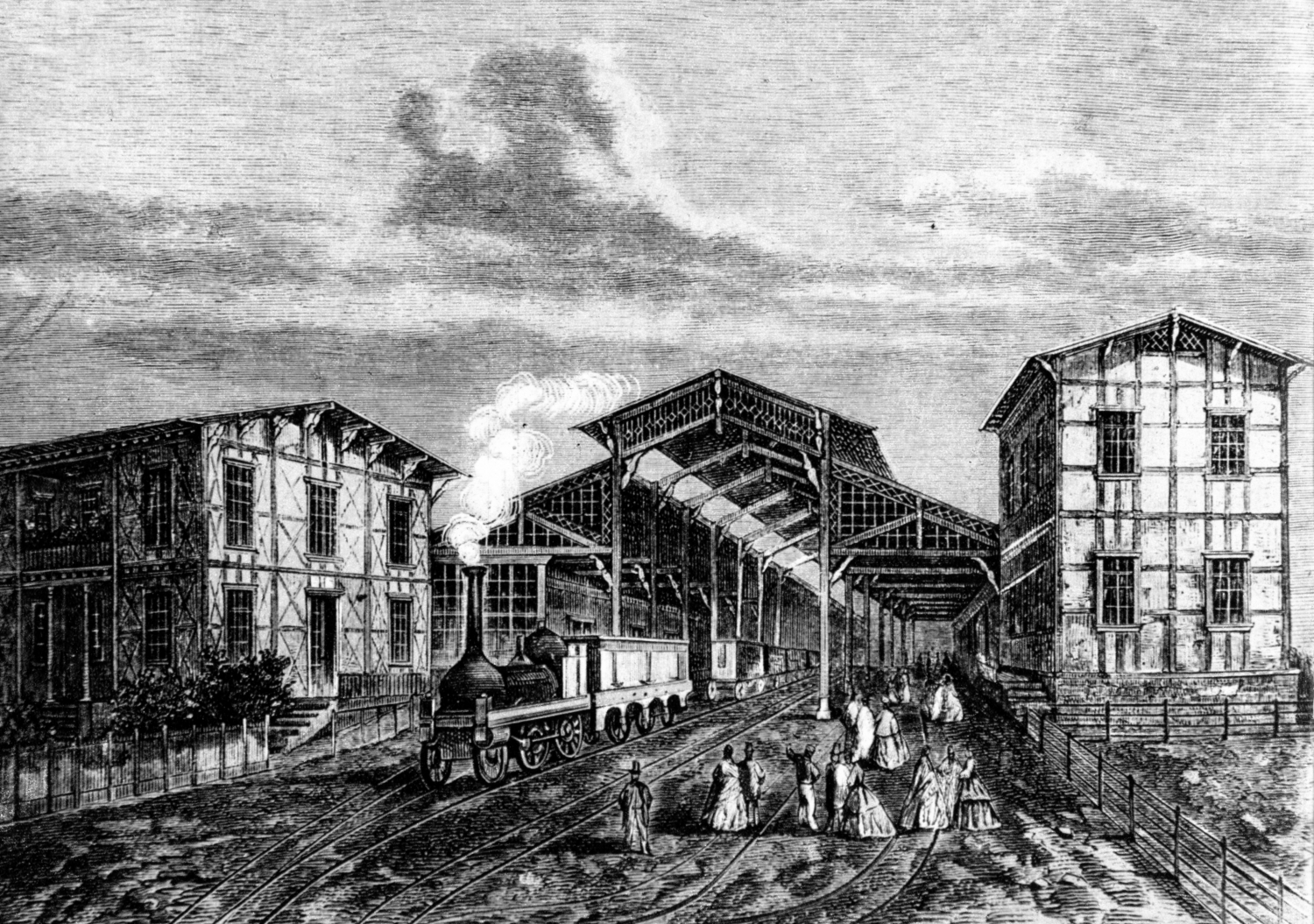
Posen, 1860s

Initially the Ministry of Education in Berlin and the Regierungsbezirk in Posen did not seem interested in Barth's advances; both suggested that the Posen municipal authorities get engaged instead. Negotiations about some sort of joint management formula took place between Luisenstiftung and the town hall in 1870-1871 until the city eventually stepped back. At this point the Regierungsbezirk stepped in, suggesting official takeover of the school. This is not what Barth was aiming for; his objective was obtaining official financial backing with the school governance system possibly unchanged, the latter ensuring his personal rule in Luisenschule. In 1871-1873 the headmaster did his best to block official Prussian designs quoting all sorts of cases, including the juridical and political ones. Talks between the ministry and the foundation turned into a legal war; eventually the government resolved to a number of irregularities until in 1873 the Luisenstiftung foundation was dissolved and the school was taken over by state.

== Public school: first decades ==
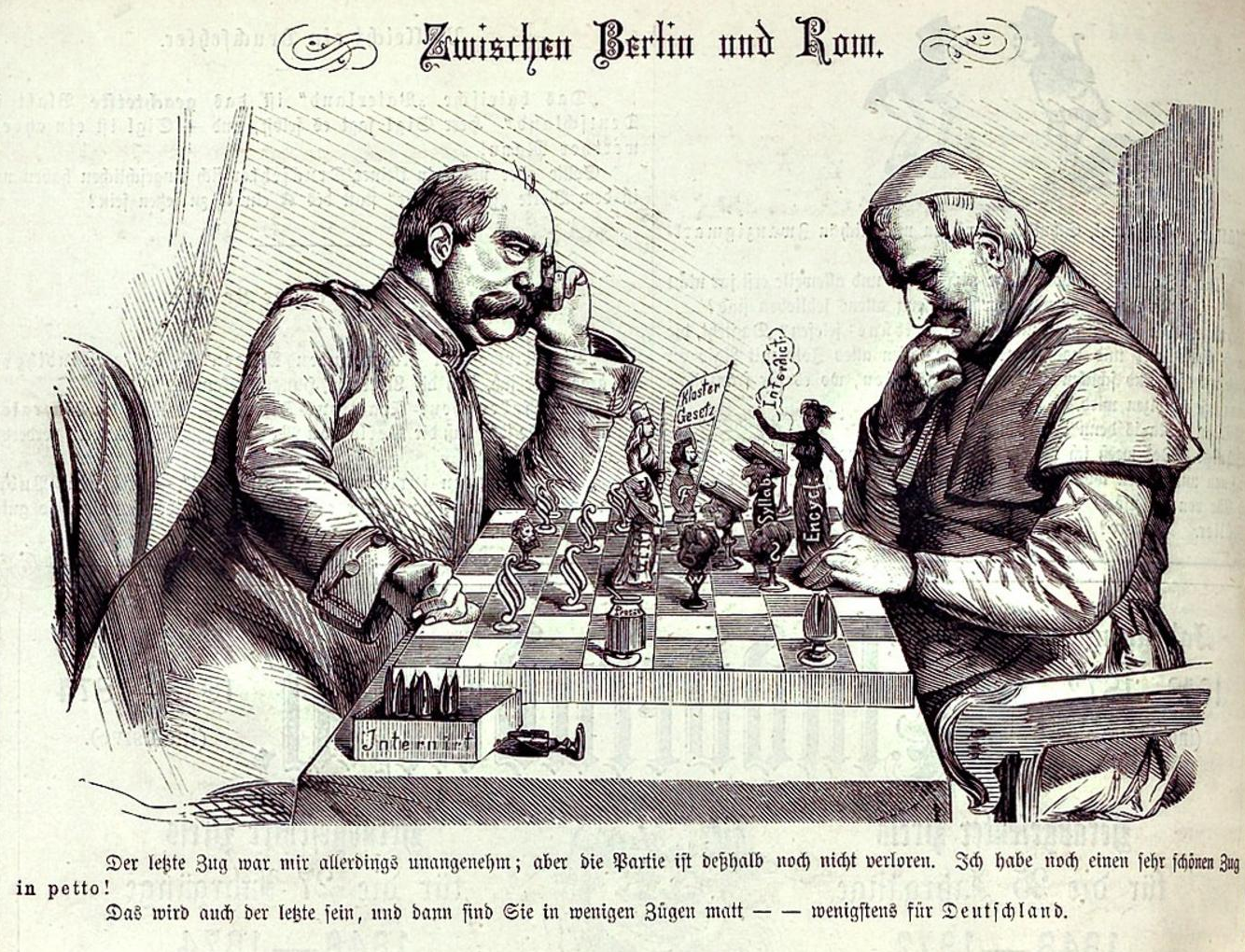
Kulturkampf in cartoon

Official takeover initially did not work to Luisenschule's advantage and its prestige declined; the seminar was reduced to a standard Volksschulseminar and the school turned into its Übungsschule. Though there were attempts to cultivate some features of the old Luisian tradition, especially focus on arts in general and on music in particular, the quality of teaching decreased. Luisenschule seemed left far behind the conventional schools, especially behind the Ursuline one; the latter boasted of larger and better qualified staff, including a number of native French and English teachers, and attracted far more students. As a measure to address the problem and to raise recruitment Luisenschule once again and this time ultimately abandoned numerus clausus; starting the mid-1870s the number of Jewish girls again started to rise significantly. As to Barth himself, he was dismissed and passed away soon afterwards.

In the early 1870s the Prussian authorities commenced campaign against the Sacred Heart and Ursuline schools; it is not clear whether it was a concerted but local attempt related to taking over of Luisenschule or rather it was part of the just commencing nationwide Kulturkampf, Bismarck's campaign against the Church. The campaign amounted to a number of administrative restrictions, fiscal and legal measures and new teaching requirements. The initiative proved fully successful: the Sacred Heart school closed in 1873 and the Ursuline school closed in 1875. The Ursuline order moved away to Galicia; their real estate was purchased by the provincial authorities and marked for Luisenschule. Soon afterwards a new building was constructed on the post-Ursuline plot. In 1880 Luisenschule left the Gorka-Palace, occupied for 46 years, and moved into the new premises at Mühlenstrasse. The 50th anniversary of the school was celebrated already in the new home; it was presided by a new headmaster, Eduard Baldamus.

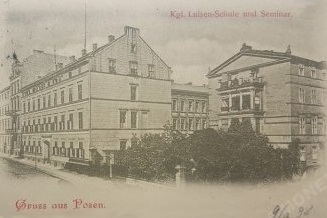
Luisenschule, early 20th c.

The 1880s produced final Luisenschule's integration into the public schooling system, though its dualistic structure was maintained; teachers' seminars were retained and the establishment operated as "Luisenschule und das Lehrerinnen-Seminar". Culturally it was already entirely German, though ethnically apart from a fraction of Poles a much larger share of students was made up of girls from mostly assimilated Jewish families. Remnants of the Luisian multi-cultural tradition were ultimately dropped in 1888, the last year when Polish was taught; Luisenschule was supposed to educate patriotic Prussian and German women. The recruitment crisis was overcome and in the late 1880s the number of students started to rise again.

== Public school: last decades ==
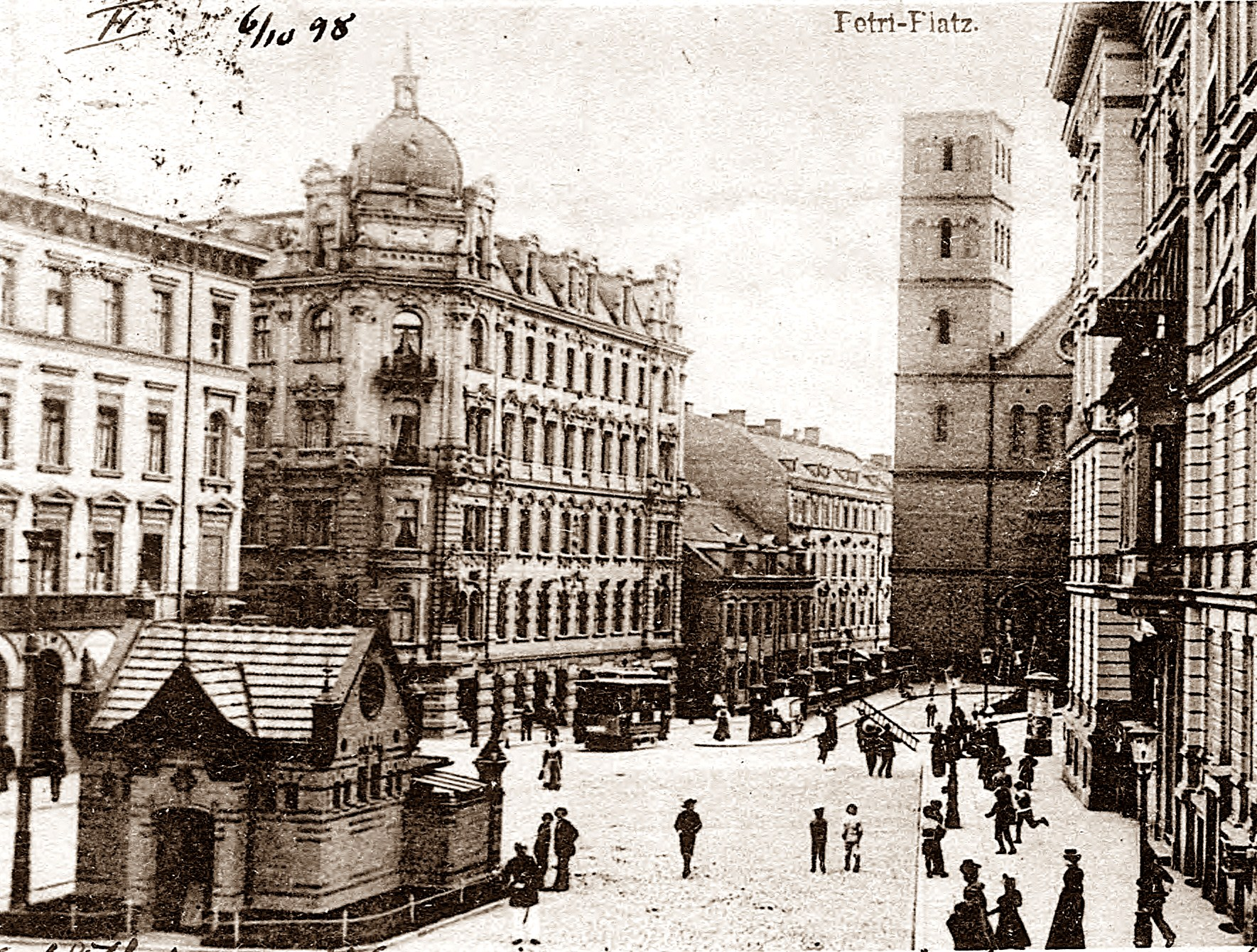
Posen, 1890s

There were 209 college-type schools for girls in Prussia of the 1890s; of these, only four were claiming royal status in their name. Apart from the Posen Luisenschule, the ones entitled to use the "Königliche" title were Elisabethschule in Berlin, Augustaschule in Berlin and Mädchenschule in Trier, a privilege which provided minor admin advantages but ensured also prestige and elitist status. Luisenschule at least partially re-gained its previous stature. Moreover, present-day historians note that at the turn of the centuries it remained somewhat unorthodox compared to standard Prussian female schools, acknowledged in particular for high level of teaching music, arts and physical exercises. Some refer to it as progressive. Indeed, the school ambience seems to have contributed to formation of the later painter Margarete Gerhardt, the liberal-democratic Deutsche Demokratische Partei politician, Elise Ekke, and the physician Hedwig Landsberg, later wife of Rolf Landsberg, all frequenting the school at the time. The number of students kept growing and in the early 20th century it reached 300 again.

The teachers' seminars remained among key magnets of the school, attracting in particular the girls of the Jewish background. The seminar gained recognition beyond the province, e.g. luring students from Thorn in the neighboring West Prussia. In terms of social composition Luisenschule remained an institution of "höhere Töchter", girls mostly from higher and mid-range bourgeoisie; they were daughters of officials, merchants, etc. The fraction of Poles kept dropping and did not exceed 5%; Polish girls preferred rather smaller private Posen schools. Their position changed in 1908, the last year of Baldamus’ tenure as headmaster; a new law on female education entered into force. The category "Höhere Mädchenschule" was reserved for schools meeting fairly high criteria related to staff and curriculum; Luisenschule was one of the few in the city which met them. Polish private establishments, some of them with long tradition, e.g. those ran by the Danysz sisters, Antonina Estkowska and Anastazja Warnka, were categorized in the lower rank of "Gehobene Mädchenschule".

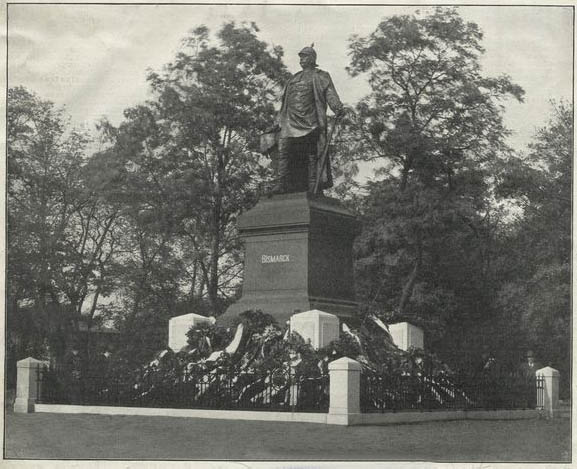
Bismarck monument, Posen 1900s

During the first decades of the 20th century Luisenschule was culturally entirely German; it formed part of the Prussian education system and worked to meet its political objectives. In the 1910s the Poles considered it "gniazdo hakatyzmu", "the HaKaTa liar". The staff were depicted as struggling to eradicate any cultural let alone political Polish preferences of students; even private conversations held in Polish were subject to penalty measures. Few Polish girls still attending Luisenschule recollected later that in the "nienawistna uczelnia" they felt harassed and persecuted. Unable to speak Polish but unwilling to speak German, in private they spoke French; over time also conversations held in French became subject to penalties. During the Great War period the lessons were commenced not with the customary greetings, but with "Gott strafe England".

== End of Luisenschule ==
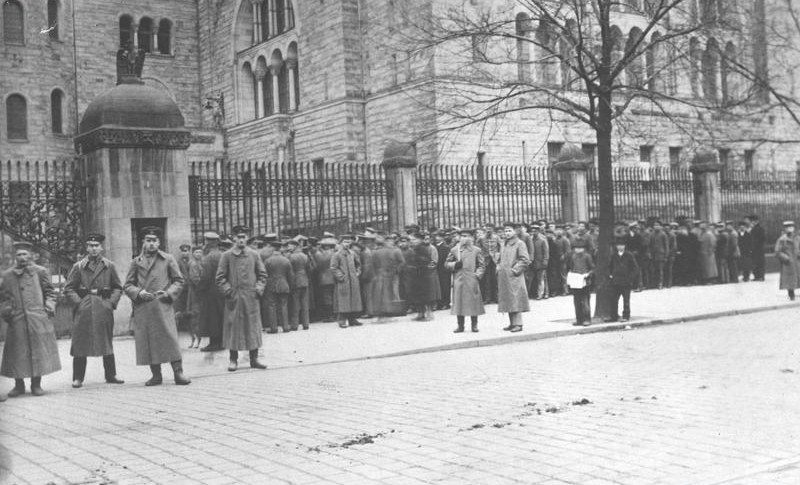
Last German troops in Posen, December 1918

In December 1918 the Prussian administrative structures in Posen collapsed and political power was claimed by the freshly emergent local Polish body, Naczelna Rada Ludowa. The well-organized NRL immediately dispatched to Luisenschule its representative, Maria Swinarska, a former Ursuline graduate. Technically she assumed the post of a beirat, an adviser to the headmaster Joachim Güldner, and was entrusted merely with introducing the instruction in Polish. In fact she became the grey eminence of the place, at the turn of 1918/1919 supervising cultural and political Polonisation of the establishment. It seems that at this stage the Poles did not have a specific plan for the school; for the time being their intention was to ensure continuity of teaching and to remove the German political flavor. Shortly after her arrival the German Luisenschule staff presented Swinarska with a number of conditions, amounting to splitting the school into a German and a Polish section; German teachers were to teach the German girls and the Polish teachers were to teach the Polish ones. Once Swinarska rejected the ultimatum they ceased to show up; in response and following consultations with NRL, Swinarska expelled all German students.

As there were almost no Polish staff in school the instruction would have been largely fictitious, yet in the early 1919 the Germans started to resume teaching; also the German girls were re-admitted. Relations remained very tense, e.g. Poles and Germans did not shake hands. Indeed, in some age groups separate national sections were formed. Due to German numerical domination among the staff, the school kept conducting its business in German, including issuing of German-language documents. However, in the spring of 1919 Prowincjonalne Kolegium Szkolne, a newly formed provincial Polish schooling board, decided to break with the perceived Prussian and anti-Polish Luisian tradition and to find a new name for the school. Particular care was taken to emphasize Polish patriotic threads, links with the local Wielkopolska region and resistance to German pressure; eventually the school was named after a medieval princess Dąbrówka. The decision was formally adopted in May 1919.

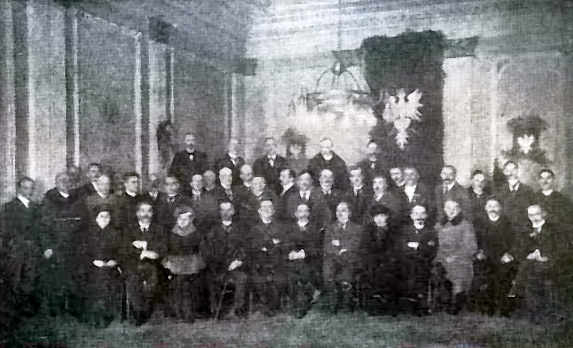
Naczelna Rada Ludowa, Poznań

During the summer holidays most German teachers and an unspecified number of students left. Gaps were partially filled with Poles, and in September the school commenced the 1919/1920 school year as Państwowa Uczelnia Żeńska Dąbrówki with Maria Swinarska as its headmaster. Instruction was in Polish only; German textbooks were gradually being replaced with the Polish ones. Ethnic composition of students remains unclear; some sources claim that German girls kept prevailing, others maintain that they were in minority. None of the sources consulted provides any information on the number of Jews.

== Legacy ==
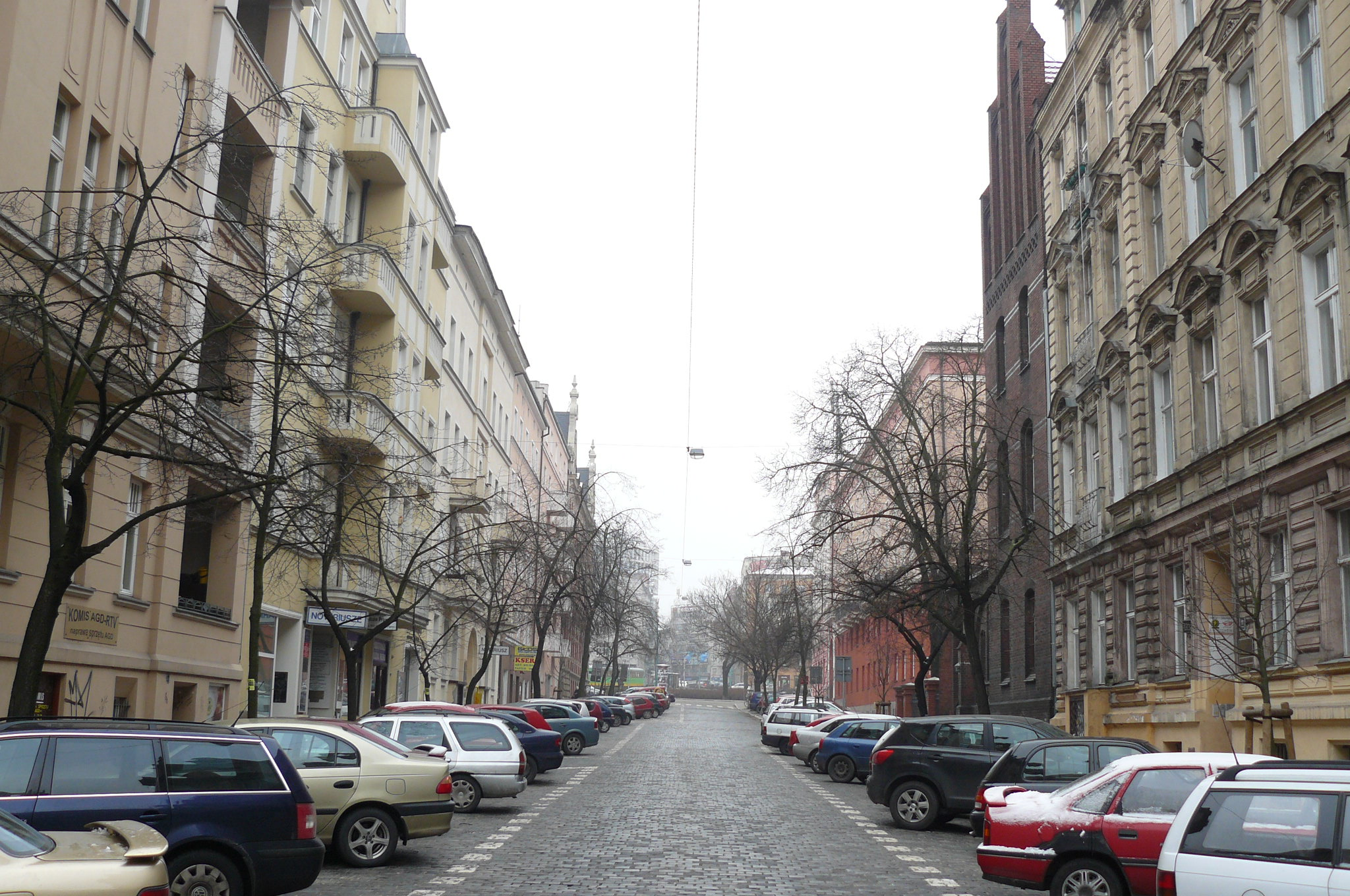
Former Mühlenstrasse; school premises used to stand back-right

The Prussian authorities tried to maintain the Posen Luisenschule tradition. When a private female Königsberg establishment was turned into a public Hufen Oberlyzeum in 1921, it laid claim to Luisian heritage of the Posen school; some sources refer plainly to Luisenschule having been relocated from Posen to Königsberg. Apart from taking over some of the staff, the Königsberg lyzeum backed its claim by high level of teaching music and stress on musical education in general. The Hufen Oberlyzeum operated until January 1945, when it ceased to exist. Since then none of the schools active in Germany referred to the Posen Luisenschule pedigree. The Berlin-based Königin-Luise-Stiftung and numerous Bundesrepublik schools bearing the name of Luise refer to another tradition, namely this of the Prussian queen Louise.

The Polish Dąbrówka School intentionally broke with the Luisian tradition, deemed representative of Prussian, vehemently anti-Polish policy. However, there were some threads of continuity. Apart from the building, both establishments shared the female profile, teachers’ training courses and some students, who commenced education in Luisenschule but completed it in Uczelnia Dąbrówki. Only 11 years later the Polish school started to pose as some sort of continuity of the Luisenschule. Exact motives are not clear; it seems that managing board of the young establishment intended to bask in prestige of a hundred-year-old institution, as in 1930 it celebrated the centenary of birth. Some observers noted that in fact the feast commemorated neither 11th year of Dąbrówka nor 100th year of Luisenschule, but simply a hundred years since the foundation had been set up; its renewal was vaguely suggested.

Unlike some other Poznań colleges, also hosted in premises inherited from Prussian schools, after World War II the reborn Liceum Dąbrówki keeps claiming Luisian heritage and poses as an establishment set up in 1830; this is the reading advanced on its official web page and in numerous commemorative publications. None of them specifies what the alleged continuity consists of. The teachers' seminars, continued by Uczelnia Dąbrówki after the closure of Luisenschule, were shut down in 1930. Uczelnia Dąbrówki operated in the post-Luisenschule premises until the German takeover of Poznań in 1939. As after 1945 they were marked for judicial authorities, Dąbrówka was first hosted in few temporary locations until it settled at Plac Bernardyński, in the premises taken over from Liceum św. Marii Magdaleny, another Poznań college; considered hotbed of reactionary education, as means of repression it was shut down by the communist authorities. In 1967 another thread was discontinued when Liceum Dąbrówki was turned from a girls-only into a mixed-sex school. Last but not least, Dąbrówka no longer boasts of a prestigious status; among some 30 Poznań colleges, the school stands around number 10.

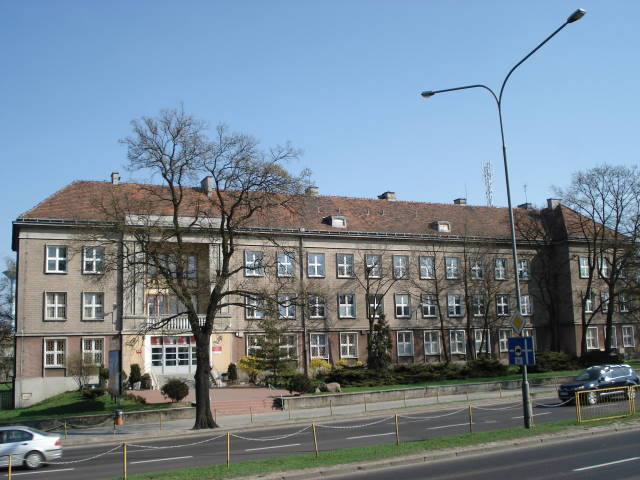
Liceum im. Dąbrówki, Poznań

Gorka Palace, which for 43 years (1836–1880) served as Luisenschule premises, was damaged during the battle of Poznań but brought back to former shape; currently it accommodates the Poznań Archaeological Museum. Three buildings at Muhlenstrasse, which hosted Luisenschule for 39 years (1880–1919), were mostly destroyed by artillery fire, also in 1945. The only one still standing was repaired and turned into a dormitory for non-resident students of Poznań colleges, recently operational as Bursa Szkolna No. 6. Remaining documents, produced by Luisenschule, are held partially in state archives in Poznań and partially in the Dąbrówka Liceum.

== See also ==
- Princess Louise of Prussia (1770–1836)
- Auguste Schmidt
- Elise Ekke
- Ida Barber
- Hufen-Oberlyzeum
- Dąbrówka High School (Poznań)
