= Irena Bobowska =

Polish poet and member of the Polish resistance

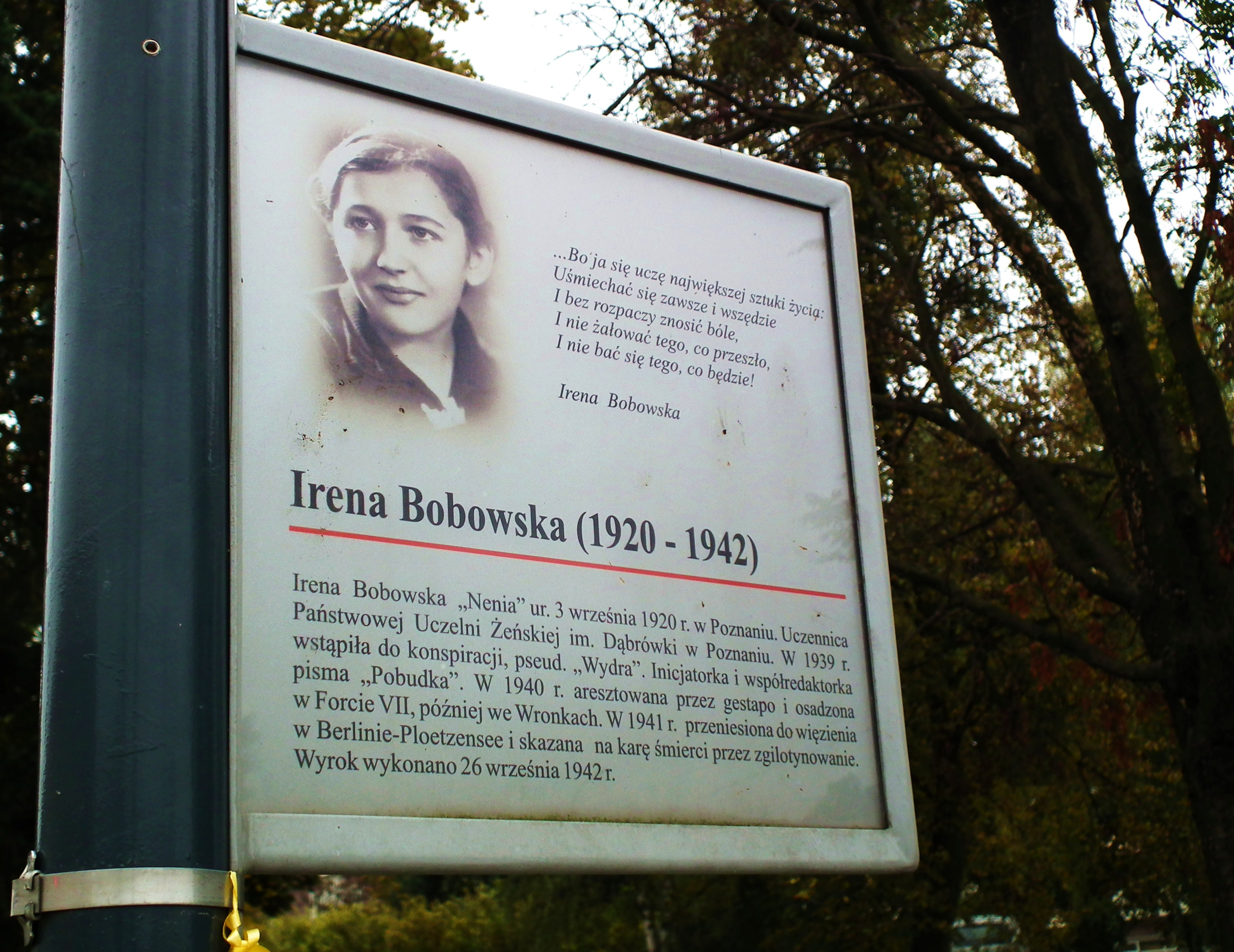

Irena Bobowska (3 September 1920 – 27 September 1942) was a Polish poet and member of the Polish resistance. Her callsign was "Otter". Though paralyzed from the waist down by childhood illness she participated in the resistance to the German occupation of Poland, before capture and execution at the age of 22.

== Early life ==
Bobowska was born and educated in Poznań, the daughter of Teodor Bobowski and Zofia Kraszewska. She was known to her friends and family as "Nenia". At the age of two she contracted poliomyelitis, as result of which she was forced to use a wheelchair for the rest of her life. In the 1930s she frequented the Dąbrówka High School in Poznań. She initiated the establishment of the first youth library in Warsaw District in Poznań. In the summer of 1939 she signed with the Polish Navy to become one of the "live torpedoes" – an unrealised project intended to create human-piloted torpedoes to be used against Nazi Germany's navy. She kept her request secret from her family.

== Resistance work ==
After the Invasion of Poland in 1939, Bobowska joined the Polish resistance against German occupation. From November 1939 she served as chief editor of the underground newspaper Pobudka (Awakening). She wrote articles and was involved in the newspaper's production and distribution. She also took part in the transportation of documents and weapons for the resistance.

== Capture and imprisonment ==
Bobowska was captured by German officials on 20 June 1940, along with other Pobudka staff. They were interned in Fort VII, from where Bobowska was transported to Wronki prison and finally to Moabit in Berlin. Throughout her imprisonment German officers subjected her to physical and mental torture, including the removal of her wheelchair, leaving her to crawl on the floor of her damp, vermin-infested cell. She was denied visits from her family. She nonetheless managed to smuggle out of the prison a number of poems, some of which – including "Bo ja się uczę", a poem advising women on mental survival in German prisons – reached Polish women prisoners in Auschwitz and other prisons.

== Final trial and execution ==
Bobowska was tried on 12 August 1942, and was allowed to make a speech in her defense. She spoke for 30 minutes, during which she neither pleaded for mercy nor offered justification of her acts. Instead she listed German atrocities in the Second World War, Bismarck's oppression of Poles, episodes of German oppression during the Partitions of Poland, and the attempted Germanization of the Polish population. She concluded her speech "Today you judge me, but one day you will be judged by somebody higher" and pleaded guilty to the charges she faced. The German court sentenced her to death. She was executed by beheading on the guillotine.

Bobowska's legacy includes the poems she wrote and pictures she drew while in prison, depicting the inner struggle to retain dignity when faced with inhuman conditions.

Today she is a patron of a Kraków Girl Scouts troop, the 344 Krakowska Drużyna Harcerek Altowianie.

== Sources ==
- Nenia Tokarska-Kaszubowa Stefania -Kronika Miasta Poznania 1999
- Encyklopedia konspiracji wielkopolskiej 1939-1945 edited by Marian Woźniak ISBN 83-85003-97-5
