= Hufen-Oberlyzeum =

Coordinates: 54.7219°N 20.4825°E

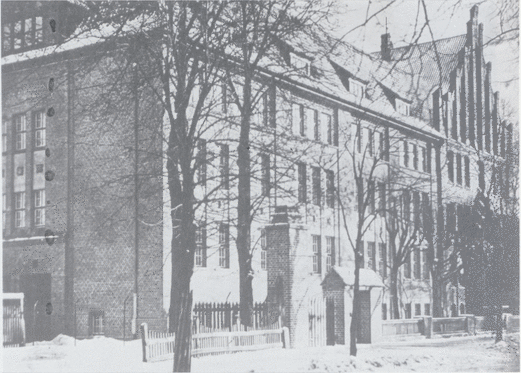
Hufen-Oberlyzeum ca. 1923

The Hufen-Oberlyzeum was a girls' gymnasium in Königsberg, Germany.

== History ==
Elvira Szittnick founded a girls' secondary school on Bahnstraße, later Hindenburgstraße, in Mittelhufen in 1902. Three years later it moved to a new building on the same street. It was acquired by the Prussian state and converted into a gymnasium in 1921, taking on the tradition of the former Königliche Luisenschule of Posen (Poznań). Alfred Walsdorff was its only director. It closed in January 1945 during World War II. The building is now used as a school in Kaliningrad, Russia. Amongst its better known pupils was Hannah Arendt, who enrolled there in August 1913.
