= Wronki Prison =

Largest prison in Poland

Coordinates: 52°42′32″N 16°23′18″E

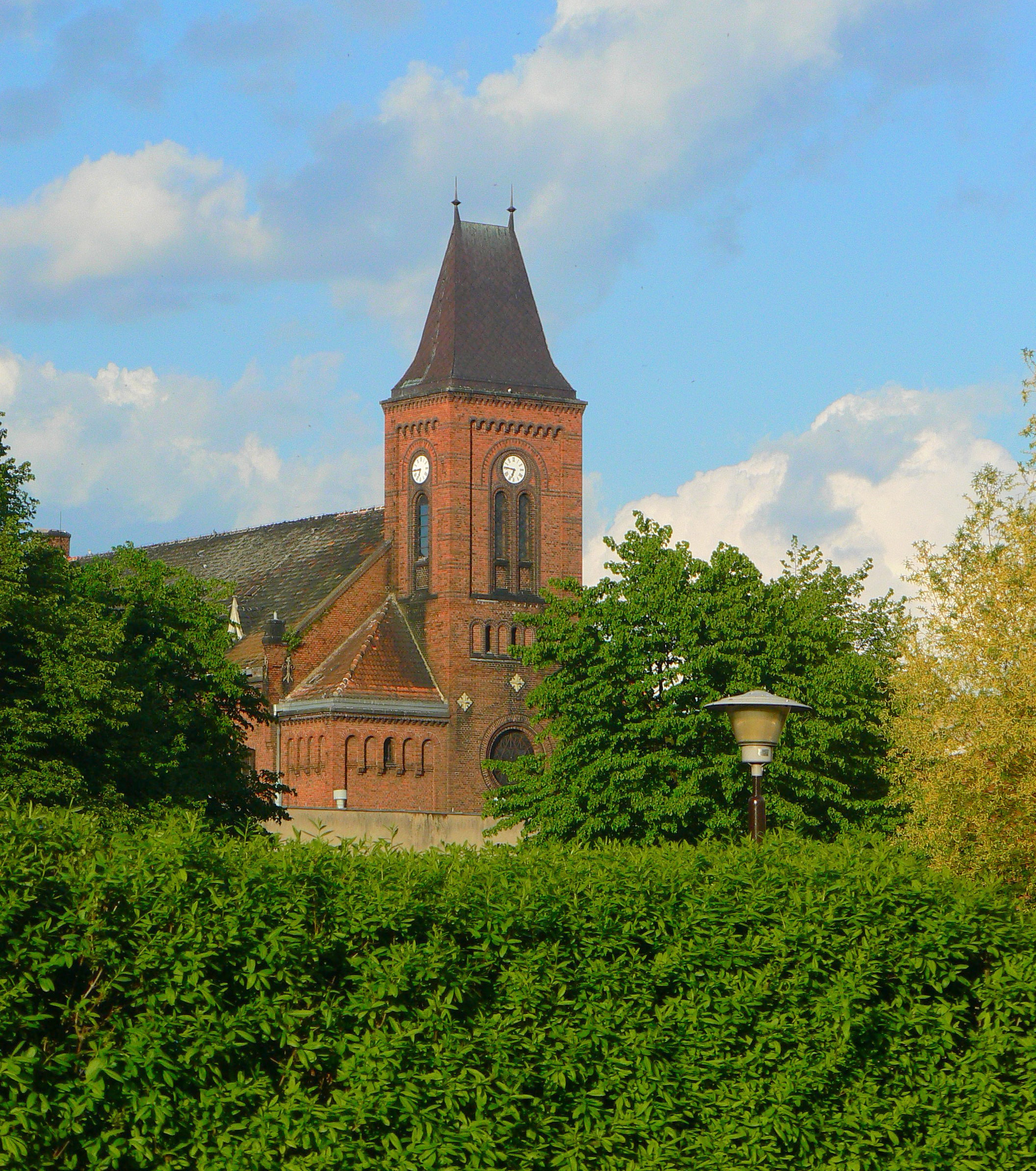
Main entrance with the clock tower

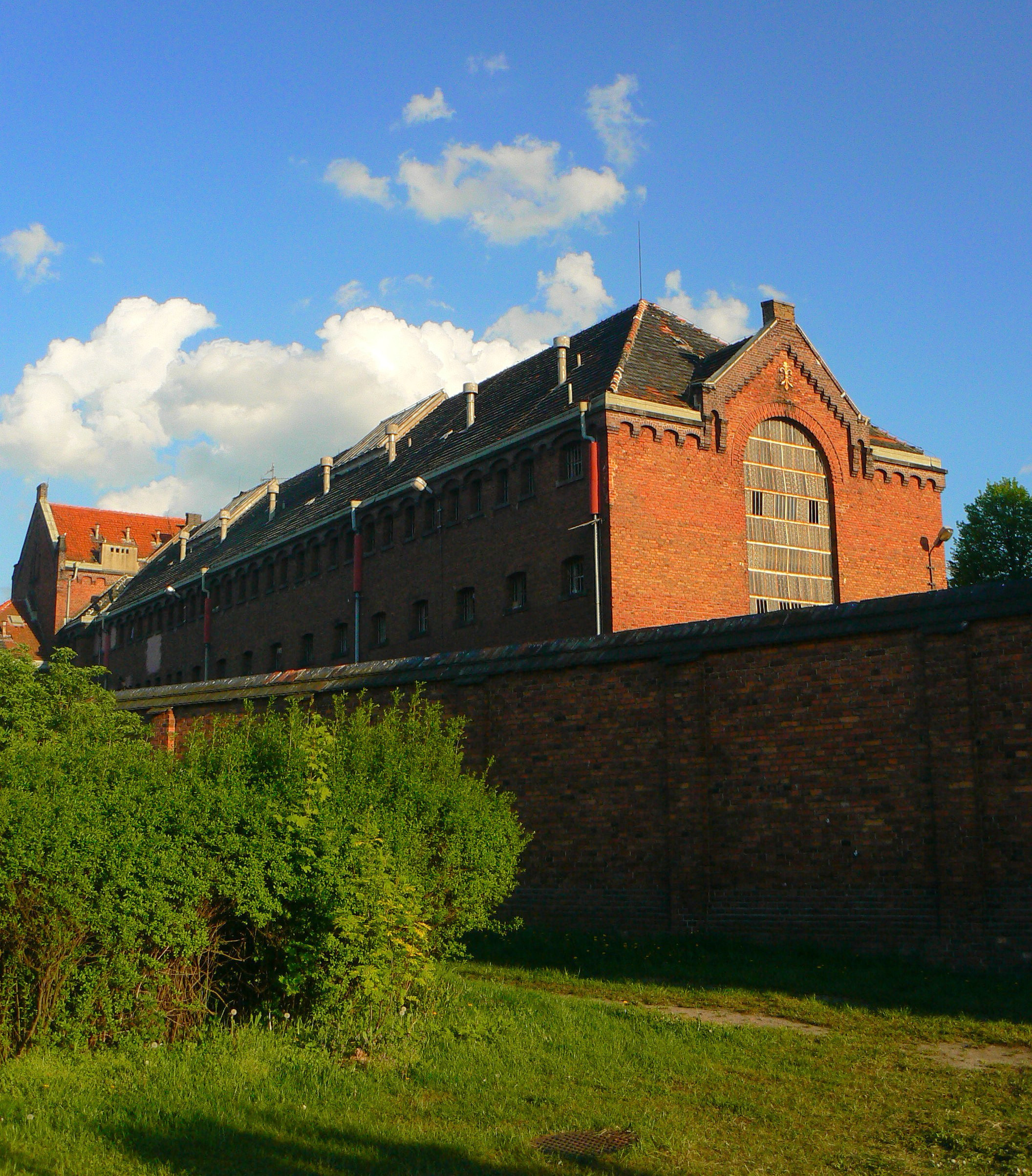
One of the buildings of the Wronki Prison

Wronki Prison (Polish: Zakład Karny Wronki) is the largest prison in Poland, holding over 1400 prisoners. Established by the German Empire in 1889, it is located in the town of Wronki, within the Greater Poland Voivodeship.

== History ==
Wronki Prison, three four-story buildings in a cross formation, was designed to accommodate 750–800 prisoners, accompanied by buildings housing the guards and other auxiliary personnel. It was built in 1889 by the Prussian government of Germany and brought into use in 1894 as the Zentralgefängnis für die Provinz Posen. It was modeled on contemporary American prisons (the Philadelphia System). Prisoners were employed in production of stockings and in other tasks. In 1890, The New York Times reported that a "town prison" building in Prussian Wronke was the site of a fatal scaffolding collapse. At least two workers were killed, and dozens were injured.

On 30 December 1918 the prison was taken over by Polish insurgents of the Greater Poland Uprising. The prisoners were set free while the prison became a temporary barracks for the insurgents. The prison resumed operations in late July 1919 as part of the new prison system of the Second Polish Republic. In interwar Poland the prison was used as a site for political prisoners.

During the invasion of Poland, the prisoners were set free. It was then taken over by Nazi Germany, first used as a temporary holding place for prisoners of war and incorporated into the Nazi Germany prison system in Reichsgau Wartheland. Most prisoners at that time were Polish political prisoners; the prison was heavily overpopulated (it was during that time that the highest number of prisoners was reported: 4,358), and prisoners were mistreated. At least 804 people (out of about 20,000 who passed through it at that time) died in the Wronki Prison during German occupation of Poland.

In 1945 when the prison was taken over by the Soviet and Polish forces, it was used briefly to hold German prisoners of war and other German prisoners. After the war, from 1945–1955, the prison was attached to the Ministry of Public Security and again used for political prisoners. A notable group of prisoners early on was formed from former soldiers of the Polish Home Army. The prison was still overcrowded, often holding about 3,000 prisoners, and prisoners were again mistreated. About 250 prisoners died during that period, out of over 15,000 imprisoned.

In 1958 a metalwork business was added to the prison.

Currently, the prison employs 400 personnel. Its official capacity is 1474 inmates; overcrowding (in late June 2009 it held 1658; in 2004 it had 1783) is causing concern.

== Structure and organization ==
The prison has an infirmary, a section for mentally ill patients, a chapel, library, sports center and secondary level educational institution (capacity of 90 prisoners).

Currently the prison is designed to hold male prisoners serving repeated terms from 3 months to 25 years.

Prisoners are employed by the prison, attached metalwork business and other workplaces, as well as for the town and gmina Wronki.

== Notable prisoners ==
- Irena Bobowska
- Stepan Bandera
- Wiesław Chrzanowski
- Stanisław Karolkiewicz
- Jacek Kuroń
- Rosa Luxemburg
- Stefan Mossor
- Stanisław Skalski
- Carl Maria Splett
- Stanisław Tatar
- Wojciech Korfanty
- Zenon Kossak
