= Dąbrówka High School (Poznań) =

Public school in Poznań

Coordinates: 52.4167°N 16.8929°E

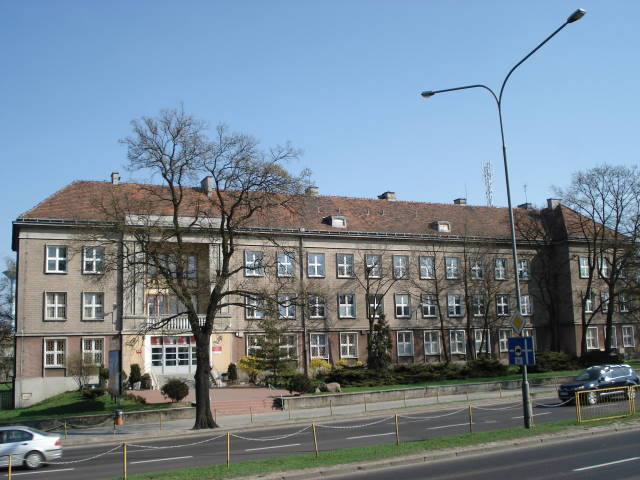
Dąbrówka school building

Dąbrówka High School in Poznań (officially in Polish: VII Liceum Ogólnokształcące im. Dąbrówki w Poznaniu, in abbreviated version known also as VII LO or colloquially simply as Dąbrówka) is a public school, located in the Poznań district of Jeżyce; it offers education to teenagers above 15 years of age. Founded in 1919, until 1967 it operated as an establishment for girls only. Currently its somewhat distinctive profile is marked by bilingual, Polish-German curriculum, complete with the Deutsches Sprachdiplom II exams. In terms of educational performance the school ranks among mid-range college-type schools in Poznań.

== Foundation and beginnings (1919) ==
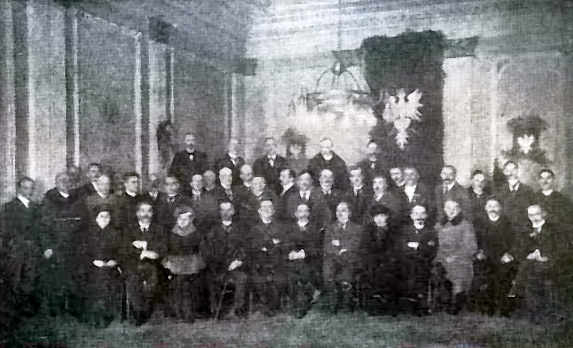
Naczelna Rada Ludowa, 1918

When in late 1918 political power in Poznań was claimed by the local Polish structures of Naczelna Rada Ludowa, all city schools for girls, the so-called Höhere Mädchenschule, were German in terms of instruction language and general outlook. The oldest and the most prestigious of them was the public Luisenschule. In the early 1919 the establishment was paralyzed by a conflict between German staff and the NRL delegate, Maria Swinarska, tasked with introducing instruction in Polish. It is not clear whether the strife contributed to the future fate of the school. In May the Polish schooling board, Prowincjonalne Kolegium Szkolne, decided to break with the Luisian tradition, perceived as tantamount to Germanisation. In somewhat obscure circumstances the school was renamed after a medieval princess Dąbrówka; the choice was supposed to underline patriotically Polish, anti-German and regional identity. The institution commenced the schooling year of 1919/1920 as Państwowa Uczelnia Żeńska Dąbrówki. Until then most German staff had left, partially replaced by newly hired Polish teachers; Maria Swinarska was nominated the new headmaster. Official ceremony emphasized re-launch rather than continuity; the 40-year-old premises taken over from Luisenschule were consecrated and following a solemn parade across the city the students joined erection of the Liberty Mound. All paperwork, until mid-1919 conducted in German, was switched to Polish.

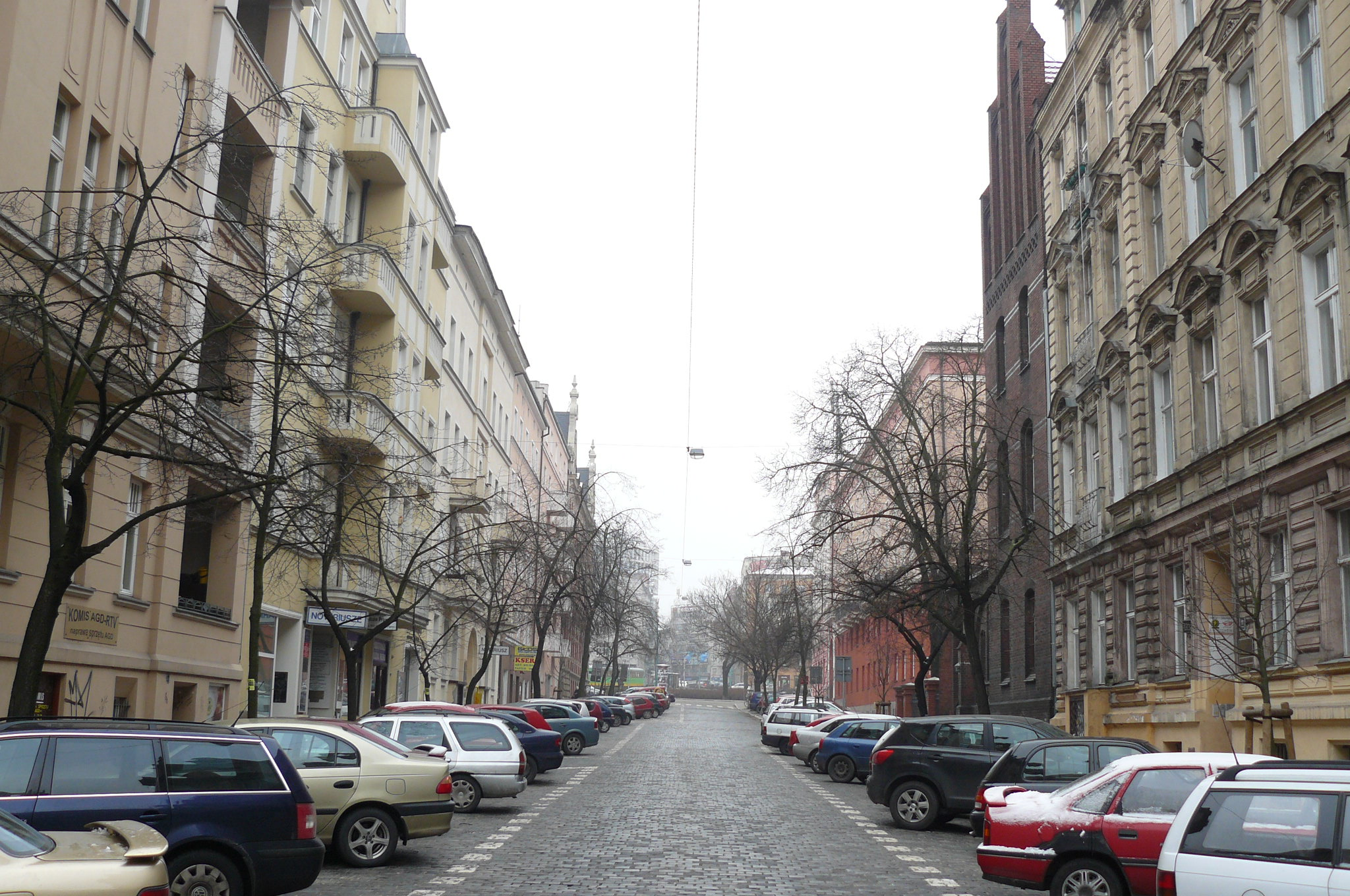
school used to be back-right

The Dąbrówka School took over from Luisenwschule a large compound located at the Western side of the Młyńska Street; it consisted of a front building, running along the street, and two large perpendicular buildings in the back, called the Northern One and Southern One; the backyard in-between was used as a sporting ground for PE lessons. Though with no electricity and no central heating, the premises were in perfect running condition. It seems that staff shortages were addressed fairly quickly, as in late 1919 there were 24 Poles among 35 teachers listed. The school retained its female profile; an unspecified number of girls commenced education in Luisenschule, but completed it already in the Dąbrówka School. Recruitment scale is not clear; the number of girls admitted in the very early 1920s ranges depending upon the source from 538 to above 1057. A huge number of candidates triggered opening of a new similar female school in the Łazarz district, where some of the students admitted have been re-directed.

Maria Swinarska (1880-1963)
originated from the family of landholders, graduated with the Ursulines, initially taught at the Posen private school of Anastazja Warnka. Studied pedagogics in Breslau, but could find work when back in Posen; taught in Berlin and Niederschlesien. She was the first Dąbrówka headmaster, serving until 1933. During the Nazi rule she ran makeshift clandestine courses. Remained in touch with the school until the late 1950s

Ethnic composition of the girls is far from agreed; some authors claim that the Germans were in minority, others claim that they dominated; none of the sources consulted provides information on Jews, traditionally forming a significant fraction of the Luisenschule students. The number of schooling groups slightly exceeded 30, some 2/3 with instruction in Polish and 1/3 in German. Initially the school offered curriculum according to various teaching schemes and some sources claim that in fact there were five formulas co-existing: gymnasium, lyceum, high lyceum (seminar for teachers), practice unit (training ground for seminarians) and a so-called economy school (of unclear formula). Given vastly different teaching modules, girls barely in teenage years might have mixed with young women.

== Dąbrówka School (1919-1939) ==
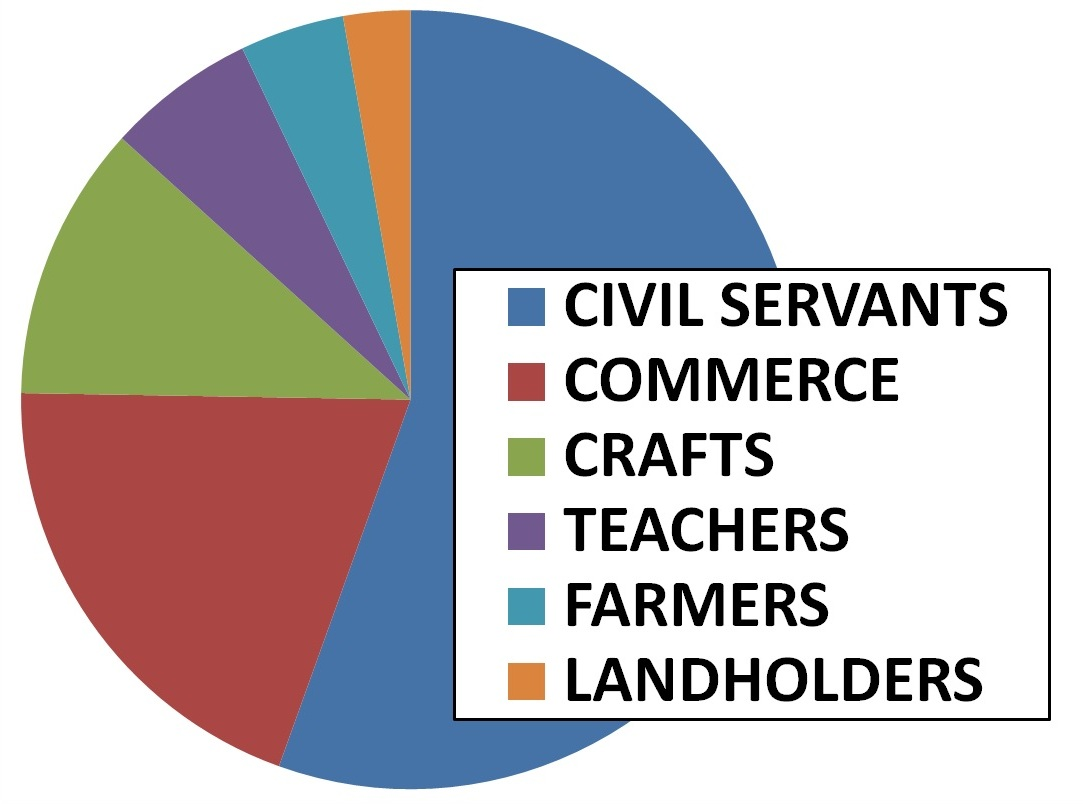
Social background of students

Throughout most of the interwar period Dąbrówka was one of two public and one of five female high schools in Poznań in general; it was also the most prestigious one. The establishment was entirely Polish in terms of instruction language and general outlook. There is no information on groups with German, which must have disappeared in the early 1920s; later memoirs of Polish students only exceptionally refer to German colleagues. German textbooks and manuals were gradually being replaced with Polish ones. In terms of religion the school was clearly a Roman Catholic one and none of the sources notes presence of Protestant ministers. Until the late 1920s the overall number of students hovered around 800. Once a neo-humanist division was set up in 1929 - since 1936 operational as entirely separate Państwowe Gimnazjum Żeńskie im. Klaudyny Potockiej - the number of girls probably decreased slightly.

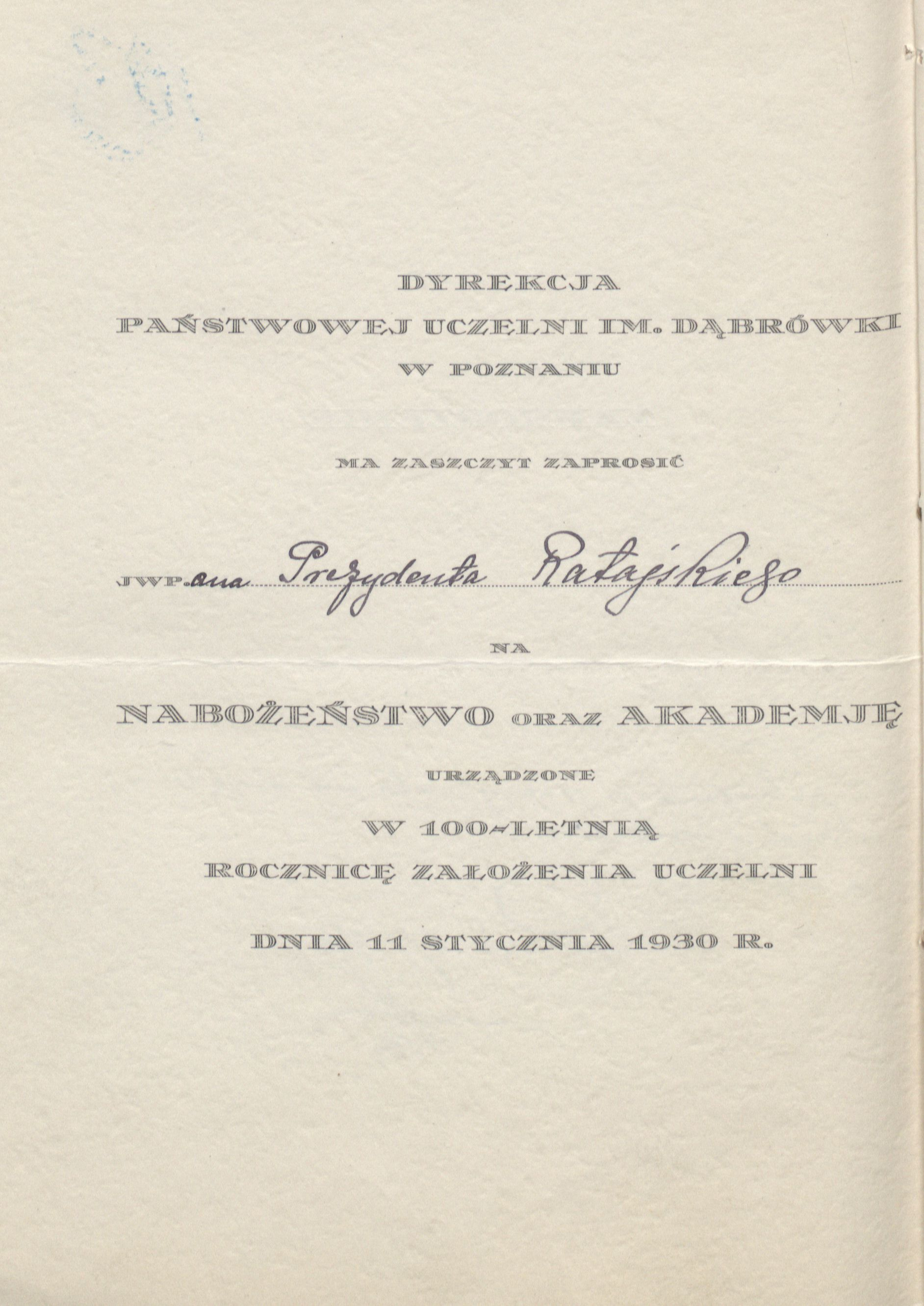
"centenary", 1930

The key feature of the school's history in the interwar period was gradual homogenization of the curriculum; both decades, but especially the 1920s, are marked by constant effort to standardize and unify the teaching formula. Starting the 1920/21 schooling year the seminarian curriculum was being shorted by a year every schooling year; in parallel, also the practice school program was being reduced; both modules were closed in 1930 and from then on Dąbrówka did not educate teachers any more. Similarly, the 10-year lyceum curriculum was being curtailed gradually. It was the gymnasium module which started to dominate, though it was subject to change as well; the so-called realgymnasium curriculum was limited and it disappeared entirely in the early 1930s. Since then Dąbrówka adopted mostly a dual humanistic and neo-humanistic gymnasium profile; the latter differed due to emphasis on foreign languages. Once Gimnazjum Klaudyny Potockiej formally split off in the late 1930s Dąbrówka became a standard humanistic gymnasium. The school premises underwent major refurbishment in 1928 and electricity was fully introduced. The school boasted of having a modern meeting hall; it could have been used also as a chapel. Since 1930 the school owned a standard; it was also the year when the first Alumni Congress was held.

Irena Bobowska (1920-1942)
originated from the military family. Due to poliomyelitis she used a wheelchair from early childhood. A student in Dąbrówka in the 1930s, heavily involved in charity activities. During the Nazi rule she entered conspiracy, engaged in editorial activities, logistics and leafleting. Arrested in 1940, she underwent Gestapo interrogation. Deprived of her wheelchair, in prison she moved to investigation and back to cell crawling. Beheaded

Recruitment was based on entry exams; the girls wore black uniforms with a beret and white embroidery, the tuition fee was 110 zł. The mid-bourgeoisie families dominated, represented mostly by civil servants and to a lesser degree commerce. There were two scouting units, Sodality of Our Lady and a number of minor groups. At that time Dąbrówka, initially set up as a counter-offer to a Luisian tradition, started to claim the Luisenschule heritage. Exact motives are not clear, yet it seems that the board intended to bask in prestige of a hundred-year-old institution; in 1930 the school celebrated its centenary. In 1933 the establishment acquired a rural estate in Czernice in the Zielonka Forest, destination of frequent holiday trips later on. The school operated until the German conquest of Poznań in 1939; initially the premises hosted Wehrmacht units, later they were handed over to Frauendienst.

== Female school in People's Poland (1945-1967) ==
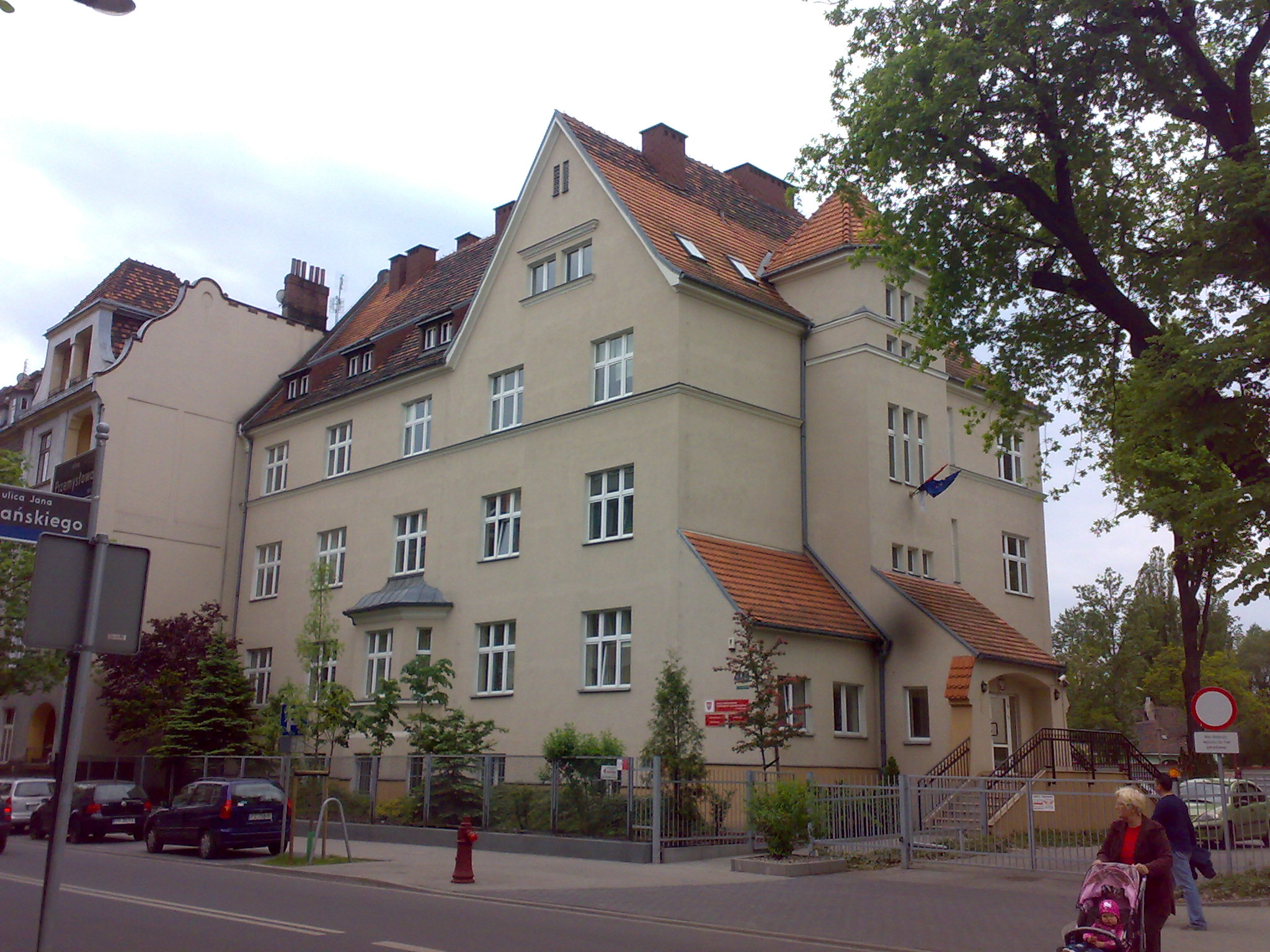
School premises in 1945

During the Second World War at least 11 students were killed by the Germans. When most of Poznań was seized by the Red Army yet with the German troops still holding out in the Citadel, some teachers approached the nascent Polish administration about re-opening of the school; few days later the Młyńska premises were almost entirely destroyed during the final phase of the battle. An attempt to seize a non-school building still standing on the former Luisenschule plot proved unsuccessful. Following a brief period when the school operated jointly with the Potocka College and once a formal decision to re-open the school had been adopted, recruitment took place in the former Chamber of Commerce building. In 1945-1948 Dąbrówka was hosted in premises of Państwowe Liceum Pedagogiczne, Zamoyska College and the former Colegium Marianum. The school commenced the schooling year of 1948/49 at Plac Bernardyński, in the premises taken over from another college, shut down as hotbed of reactionary education. At that time the heavily damaged building at Młyńska Street was refurbished and turned into a dormitory for non-resident girls of Poznań colleges.

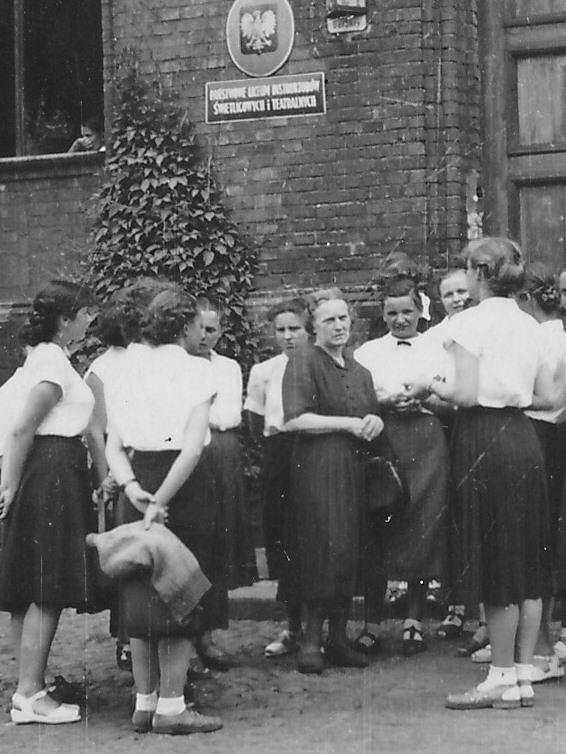
Dąbrówka girls, 1953

The school soon returned to pre-war scale; in 1946 there were 730 girls enrolled. Initially education adhered to different formulas, resulting in age of students ranging from 11 to 28. The curriculum was unified in 1948, when the establishment was formally turned from Państwowe Gimnazjum i Liceum Żeńskie into Szkoła Ogólnokształcąca Stopnia Licealnego. In line with the nationwide framework of an 11-year general education scheme, the establishment offered schooling in 4 highest grades. Mounting political pressure introduced new rituals, modifications of curriculum, left-wing youth organizations and staff changes, which in the late 1940s resulted in totally new profile of the institution. It is not clear whether the school met expectations of the schooling board; on the one hand, control results were far from satisfactory and there are news of some conspiracy groupings among the girls, on the other, the school got Ministry of Education awards. The new policy climaxed after 1954, when Dąbrówka was renamed to VII Liceum Towarzystwa Przyjaciół Dzieci. In wake of the 1956 political thaw both scouting and religious instruction re-appeared in school; in 1957 Dąbrówka returned to its traditional name.

Janina Kamińska (1903-1996)
originated from the family of state officials. Since 1920 a student in Dąbrówka, since 1927 a teacher. During Nazi rule imprisoned for 2 years. In 1945 she was the moving spirit behind the re-opening of the school and became its first post-war headmaster. As the icon of pre-war tradition she was sacked by the authorities and removed to another college. Member of the Dominican lay order, 1971-1983 its head for Poland. Has never married

In the late 1950s political pressure was resumed; in 1959 the school entered Association of Secular Schools, in 1960 last scouting units disappeared and religious instruction was terminated again. The early 1960s are the period of post-war demographic peak; the number of girls exceeded 1,000 and the number of teachers reached 150. The premises were entirely re-furbished in 1965; central heating replaced previous old-fashioned systems, floors were re-done and electricity wiring got modernized; a canteen was opened, though as there was no kitchen meals were delivered by contracted-out providers. The mid-1960s is also the last period when the school enjoyed prestigious status; as centrally located and the oldest one in Poznań, it was frequently visited by officials and the girls used to represent the city youth at various state and local galas.

== Standard format (1967-1994) ==
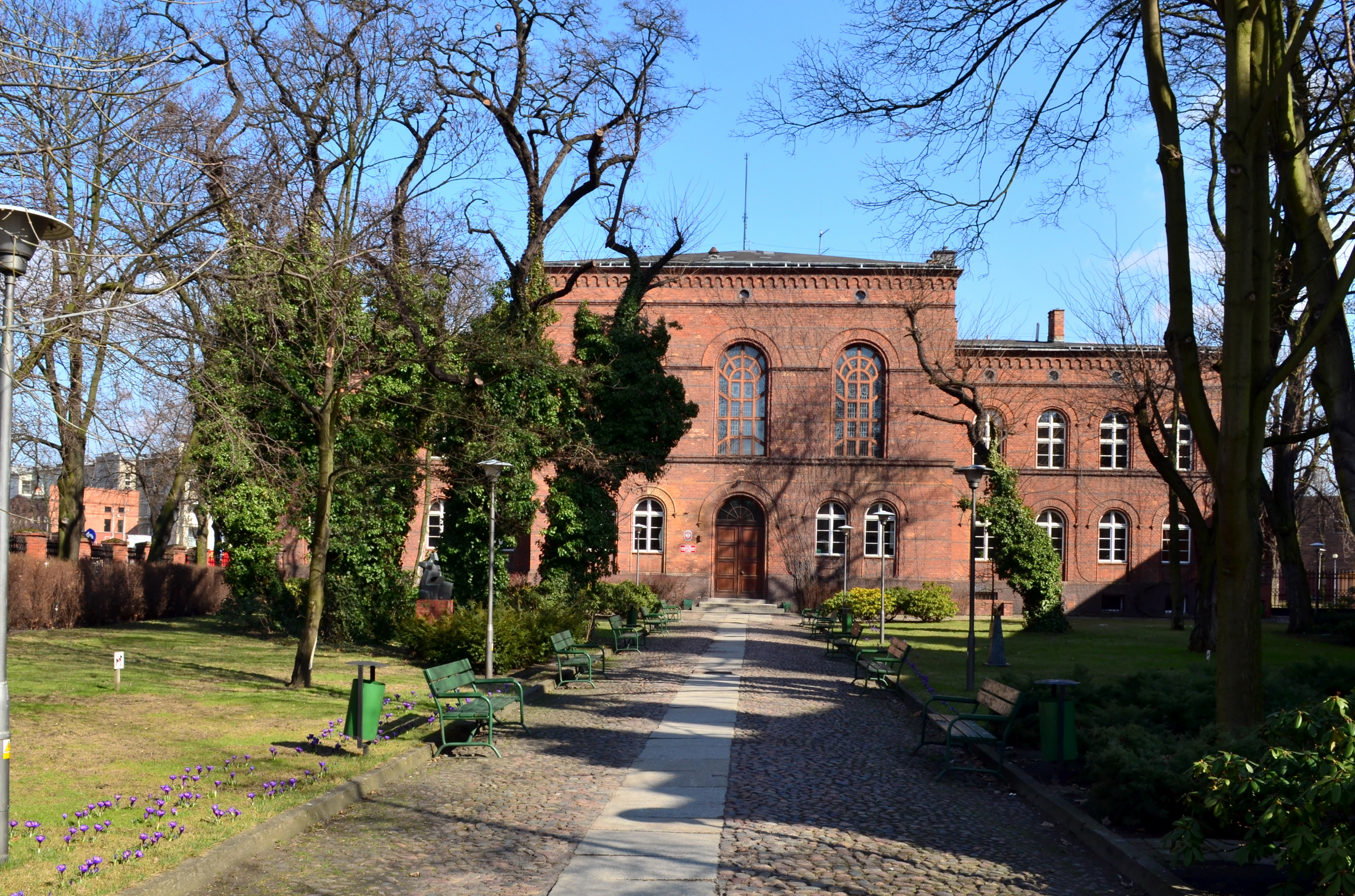
School premises 1948-1979

In 1967 the school was affected by a nationwide education reform. One change consisted of departing from upper tier of the 11-grade general education scheme, and replacing it with a 4-grade format of Liceum Ogólnokształcące (general education lyceum). Another change resulted from shutting down all female schools; it turned Dąbrówka into a mixed-sex school, the formula launched in the schooling year of 1967/68. The school was entirely re-formatted, especially that boys soon started to dominate; sporting and education successes, noted by the school at the turn of the decades, were accomplished mostly by male students. As the standard no longer corresponded to the mixed-sex profile it was withdrawn and none was used until a new one was officially introduced in 1973; during a solemn ceremony there was also an anthem adopted.

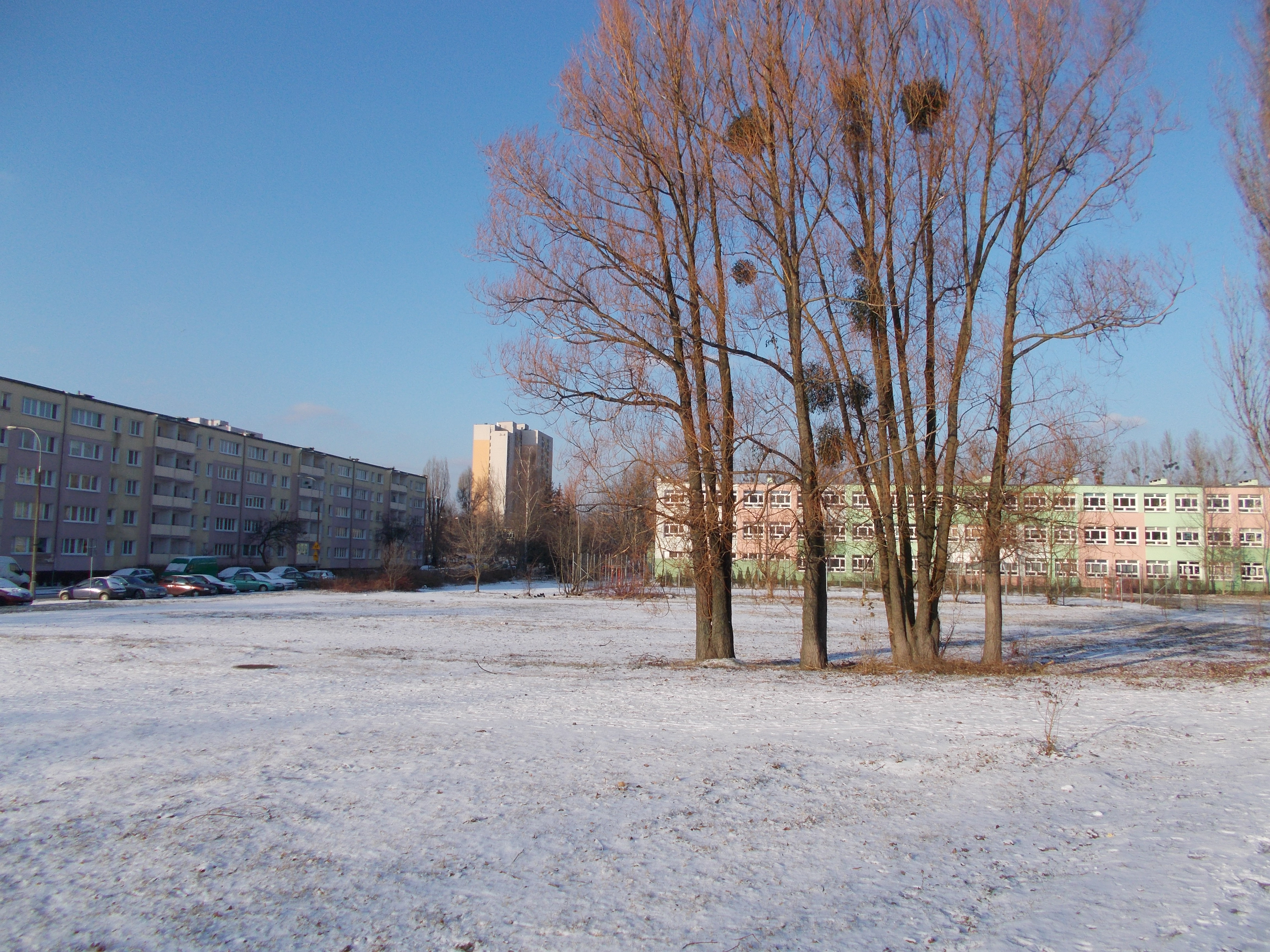
Rataje, would-be premises

Right wing of the school building was heavily damaged by fire, which broke out in 1972. Since it proved unfeasible to complete refurbishment in parallel with usual education activities, some of the premises were shut down; this in turn resulted in overcrowding. Both the school management and the local schooling board started to consider relocation of Dąbrówka to some other premises, perceived as a provisional or perhaps a permanent measure. In the mid-1970s it was planned to move the establishment to the Rataje district, where a new schooling compound was being constructed from scratch; however, in unclear circumstances in 1978 the buildings were allocated to a newly opened lyceum. Later Dąbrówka was to move to another freshly-constructed settlement at Norwida Street in the Jeżyce district; eventually the site went to a primary school. The Żeromskiego Street premises emptied by the latter were eventually marked for Dąbrówka. It is there that the school commenced the schooling year of 1979/80.

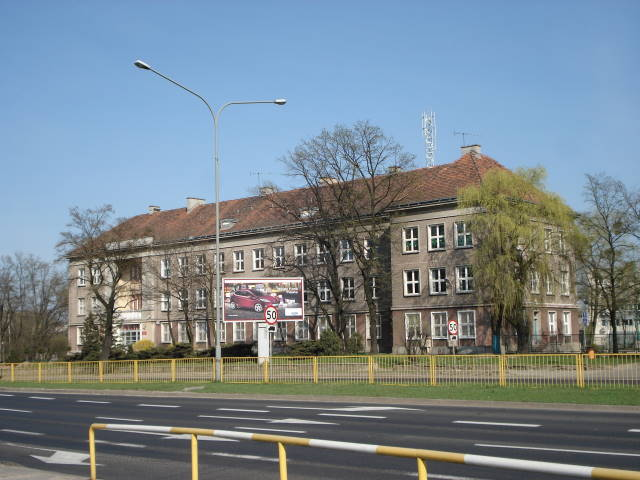
School premises since 1979

The Dąbrówka history of the 1980s reflects the tumultuous history of the country. In 1980 the staff founded a branch of Solidarność trade union; in 1981 the students made sure that a cross presented to the school by the Pope was during a solemn ceremony placed in the school foyer. The cross was withdrawn into a locked "memory hall" in 1982; this in turn caused that flowers were laid and removed from its doors. Some students were being detained during street riots or leafleting campaigns; unofficial scouting was implanted as a Green Six team. A large December 13, 1985 gathering of students marking the 4th anniversary of martial law decree produced disciplinary measures, though no-one has been expelled. In 1986 secret security operatives detained a student in the school building while official launch of the 1986/87 schooling year turned into a scandal. In the late 1980s Dąbrówka became the nucleus of a sub-culture "Naszość" group. The cross was placed back in the foyer in 1991; in the new era changes among the managing board ensued. An initiative which would prove of high importance later was the launch of a broadened curriculum of German in 1987; Dąbrówka commenced collaboration with a school from West Berlin, resulting in students’ exchange starting the year of 1988.

== Bi-lingual school and gymnasium (1994-2017) ==
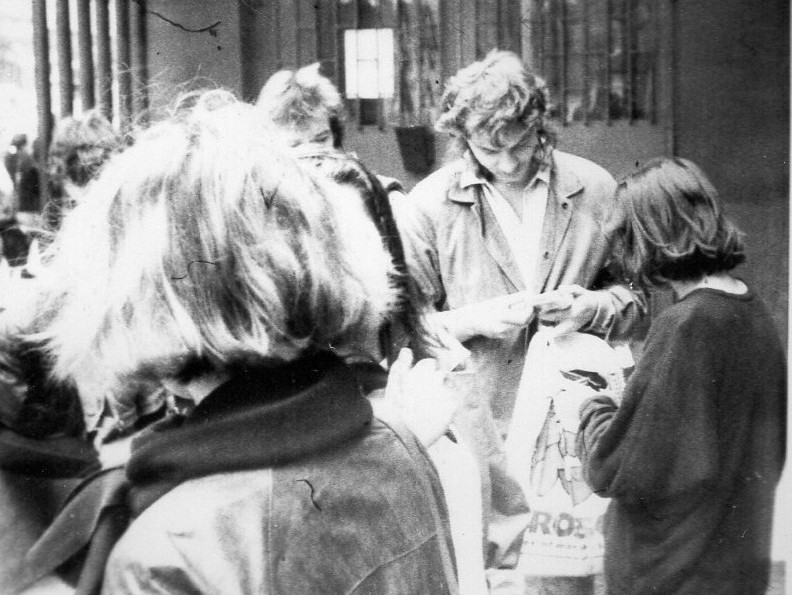
Poznań college youth, early 90s

Banking on earlier enhanced German curriculum experience, in the 1994/95 schooling year Dąbrówka opened a bi-lingual Polish-German unit; apart from a similar Polish-French one, operated by the Marcinkowski College, the initiative was a unique one in Poznań and in the Wielkopolska region. The bi-lingual curriculum covered a 5-year scheme, including the 0 grade for oldest primary school students. Its scope was systematically broadened; in the late 1990s the school embarked also on a number of programs financed by the Bundesrepublik and related to promotion of German culture and language. Dąbrówka commenced courses preparing for the Deutsches Sprachdiplom exam, which was for the first time offered in 1999; since then DSD II has been crowning the teaching of German in the school every year.

longest serving teachers
years	name	subject	period
44	Jadwiga Laskowska	biology	1962-2006
40	Irena Dropińska	foreign languages	1919–39, 1945–65
36	Regina Framska	chemistry	1970-2006
36	Wiesława Heisig	math	1971-2007
35	Krystyna Brodowska	foreign languages	1972-2007
34	Gabriela Kaźmierczyk	music	1929–39, 1945–69
31	Zdzisława Smuszkiewicz	Polish	1962-1993
31	Stefania Pietruszanka	foreign languages	1919–39, 1945–56
31	Barbara Rataszewska	physics	1919–39, 1945–56
30	Maria Paszkiewicz	Polish	1960-1990

Following a nationwide education reform of 1999 Dąbrówka was re-formatted into a 3-grade school and provided basis for setting up a 3-grade gymnasium, a phase in-between primary school and lyceum. Both units commenced the schooling year of 2001/02 as a joint Zespół Szkół Ogólnokształcących nr 10. Though legally separate, the two institutions were hosted in the same building; in terms of operations and management they remained fairy integrated, sharing the same statute, pedagogical council, students’ board and parents’ board. Following a plebiscite held among its students, the nameless gymnasium adopted the name of Dąbrówka in 2004 and received its own standard. The year of 2002 saw birth of Stowarzyszenie Przyjaciół Szkoły im. Dąbrówki w Poznaniu, an alumni association which since has been organizing their irregular gatherings. Appointment of a new headmaster in 2007 marked a symbolic change; for the first time ever the post has been assumed by a male, and for the first time ever the vacancy was filled by means of public competition. Refurbishment works carried out were modest; they consisted mostly of repairing damages caused by minor 1998 fire and purchase of new equipment.

In the early 21st century both sections of the Dąbrówka school systematically advanced their specifics – rendering them distinct from other Poznań schools – by enhancing links to German culture and language. In 2005 for the first time some students completed education by taking bi-lingual matura exam; it has been offered since then every year until bi-lingual matura was scrapped nationwide by the Ministry. Also in 2005 the school joined the Jugend Debattiert International program. In 2009 Deutsches Sprachdiplom II exams were for the first time offered at B2 and C1 levels. Around that time Dąbrówka engaged in Deutsch Wagen Tour scheme, co-organized internationally by Goethe-Institut, German embassies around the world and Deutscher Akademischer Austauschdienst . Systematic co-operation was forged with Bundesrepublik colleges in the towns of Seelze, Karlstadt i Vreden. In 2010 Dąbrówka was one of 26 bi-lingual Polish-German lyceum-type schools in Poland and one of 10 bi-lingual Polish-German gymnasium-type schools in the country; apart from the lyceum in Leszno it was the only school of such type in the Wielkopolska region.

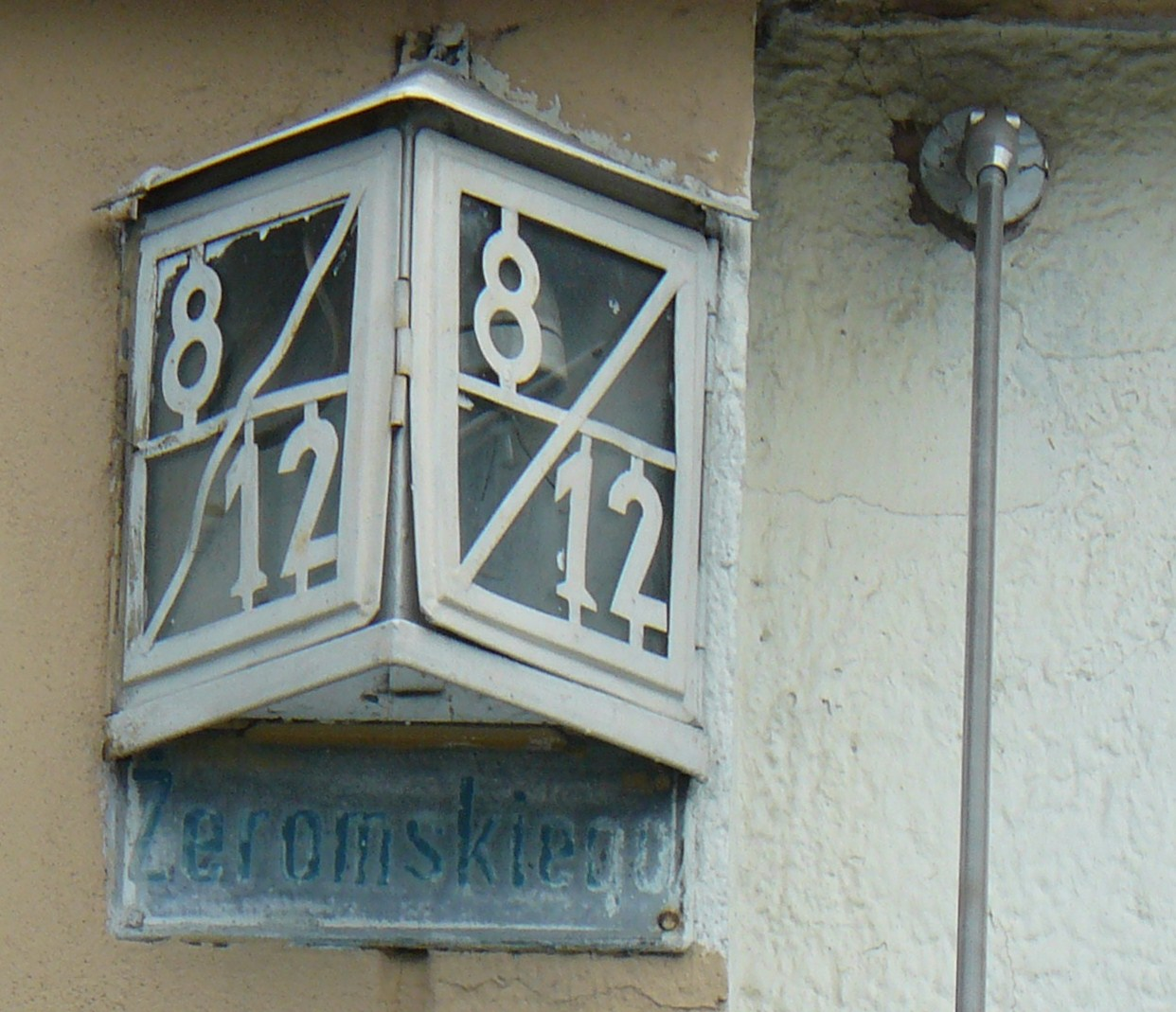

== Present day ==
The Dąbrówka lyceum and the Dąbrówka gymnasium operated jointly until 2019; following another education reform, since 2017 the gymnasium formula was being phased out until the schools were shut down two years later. High schools returned to the 4-grade scheme, to be exclusive from 2022. The college is formally managed by the municipality of Poznań, supervised by the regional schooling board; according to the financial report from 2018 its assets amounted to $1,44m. The lyceum keeps posing as a school cultivating the Luisian tradition and dates its history not from 1919 but from 1830; this is the reading dominating also in local media.

headmasters
from	to	name
1919	1933	Maria Swinarska
1933	1934	Irena Lipska
1934	1939	Cecylia Świderkówna
1945	1948	Janina Kamińska
1948	1950	Maria Iwanicka
1950	1962	Irena Czajkowska
1962	1969	Ludmiła Swinarska
1969	1991	Zofia Dąbek
1991	2007	Elżbieta Stryjakowska
2007		Paweł Kozłowski

Recently there are some 135-155 students completing education in Dąbrówka every year. Compared to other Poznań colleges it is a mid-size school with some 450 students in all grades, much less than in Potocka College or Paderewski College, which open 8 groups every year and can accommodate 250 new candidates each. In 2017 Dąbrówka offers 155 new seats in total, all divided among 5 sections profiled as focused on media, biology-chemistry, economy, engineering and bi-lingual Polish-German teaching, the latter divided into specialized sub-sections further on. In terms of popularity among gymnasium graduates the school ranks mid-range. During recruitment for the 2017/18 schooling year there were 1.08 candidates for every seat offered, compared to highest school average indicators in the city recorded by Zamoyska College (2.28), Mickiewicz College (1.83) and Paderewski College (1.54). In case of Dąbrówka the toughest entry competition was recorded in the bi-lingual section (1.32) and in the biology-chemistry section (1.26).

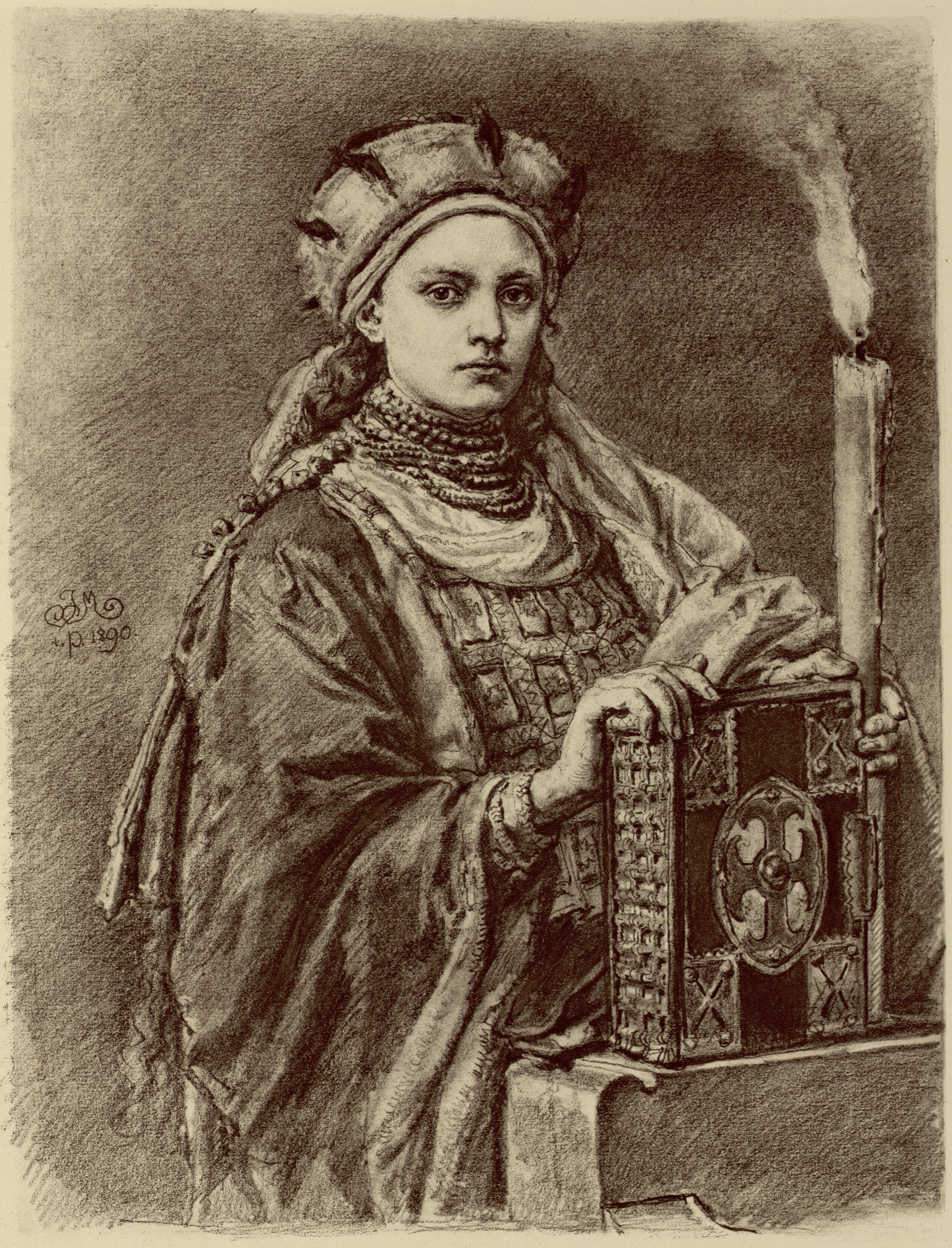
Princess Dąbrówka

Few independent institutions in Poland compile nationwide ratings of colleges in terms of their educational performance; in these charts Dąbrówka usually ranks among mid-range schools in Poznań. According to the most popular Perspektywy analysis, among some 30 college-type schools in the city Dąbrówka was rated on position 8 (2012), 7 (2013), 12 (2014), 12 (2015), 9 (2016), 9 (2017), 10 (2018), 13 (2019), 11 (2020), 9 (2021), 8 (2022), 7 (2023), 10 (2024), 6 (2025), and 6 (2026). The Wasza Edukacja rating evaluated Dąbrówka as the 10th (2017), the 7th (2018), the 6th (2019), the 9th (2020), the 6th (2021), the 7th (2022), the 6th (2023), the 9th (2024) and the 9th (2025) best high school in Poznań.

Following the 2017 phase-out of the Dąbrówka gymnasium, which ranked much higher than the high school and served as a magnet for both units, the position of Dąbrówka lyceum on the educational market in Poznań is not clear yet. Its unique feature is the bi-lingual profile, linked to the DFD II exams offered; in 2017 no college in the Wielkopolska region outperformed Dąbrówka in terms of German language matura results. On the other hand, matura results in math, Polish, non-German modern languages and other subjects in Dąbrówka are visibly worse than in the best Poznań colleges. Also, the school recorded only 5 prized places in nationwide college-level competitions during the last 10 years; in comparison, the Mickiewicz College might boast of 29 prized places.

== See also ==
- Luisenschule (Posen)
- Naszość
- Irena Bobowska

== Notes ==
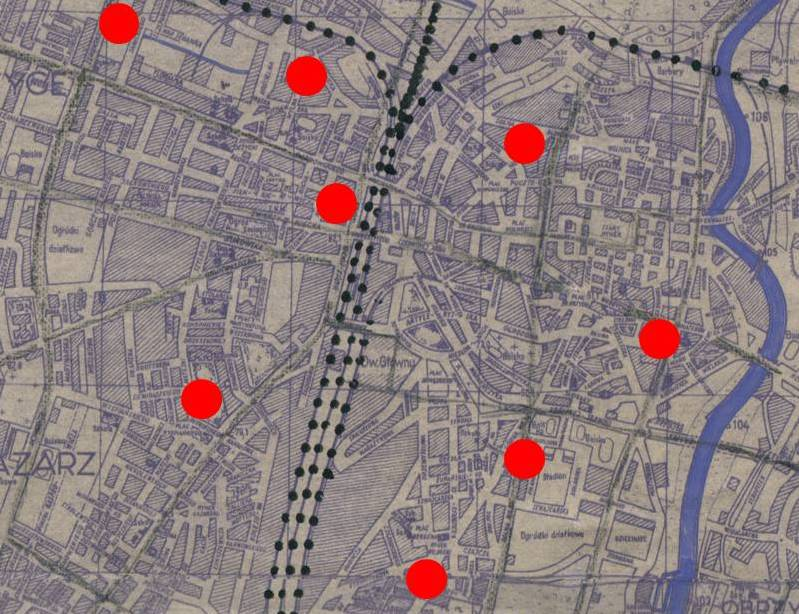
location of Dąbrówka sites in Poznań
