= Auguste Schmidt =

German feminist and educator (1833–1902)

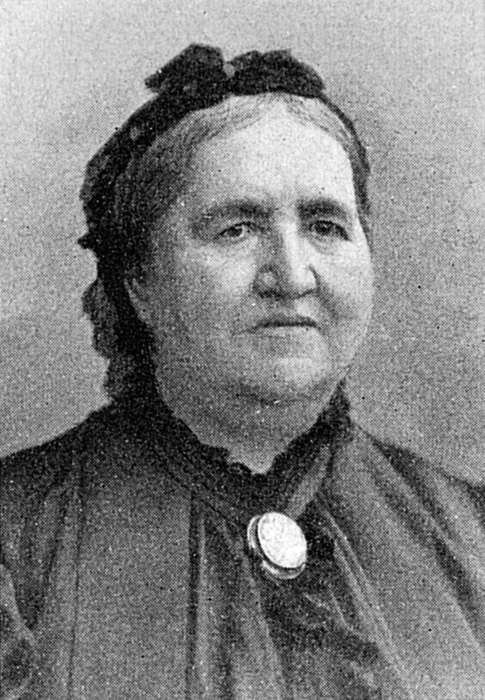
Auguste Schmidt in c. 1880

Auguste Schmidt, full name Friederike Wilhelmine Auguste Schmidt (3 August 1833 – 10 June 1902) was a German pioneering feminist, educator, journalist and women's rights activist.

== Life ==
Schmidt was born on 3 August 1833 in Breslau, German Empire (now Wrocław, Poland). She was the daughter of Prussian army artillery lieutenant Friedrich Schmidt and his wife Emilie (born Schöps). In 1842, the family moved from Breslau to Poznań where from 1848 to 1850 she studied in Luisenschule to be a teacher.

Between 1850 and 1855, she worked as a private teacher for a Polish family, and later at a private school in Upper Rybnik. From 1855 to 1860, she taught at the Maria Magdalena municipal school in Breslau. In 1861 she moved to Leipzig to become the Director of the Leipzig "Latzelschen höheren Privattöchterschule", a girls' private school.

From 1862, she was teacher of literature and aesthetics at one of Ottilie von Steyber's (1804–1870) Mädchenbildungsinstitut (Girls Educational Institutes). One of her students was Clara Zetkin. In 1864 she started a friendship with Louise Otto-Peters.

In 1866, she joined with Louise Otto-Peters in founding the Allgemeiner Deutscher Frauenverein (ADF) (General Union of German Women) in Leipzig to work for better women's access to higher education and the professions as well as better protective legislation for working women. Schmidt and Otto-Peters served jointly as president and edited the house organ, Neue Bahnen ("New Paths").

In 1869, she founded the association of German teachers and educators and in 1890, together with Helene Lange, she founded the "Allgemeinen Deutschen Lehrerinnen-Vereins" (ADLV) (General German Teachers Association).

In 1894, she became the first president of the Bund Deutscher Frauenvereine (BDF), (League of German Women's Associations), which brought together thirty-four women's civil rights movement groups under a controlling body. This expanded to 65 in the first year.

She published two novels in 1868, Tausendschön (Daisies) and Veilchen (Violets), a short story, Aus schwerer Zeit (From Hard Times), came out in 1895.

She retired in 1900 and died in Leipzig on 10 June 1902.

In 2003, a 14m long plaque was attached to the house in which she lived between 1863 and 1864 at Lortzingstraße 5, Leipzig, to commemorate her life.
