= Teachers' seminar =

Teachers' seminars were seminars (not to be confused with "seminary") for elementary school teacher education. Usually it was a boarding school. In some countries the term is still in use.

In Germany, there were separate seminars for female students (de:Lehrerinnenseminar).

== See also ==
- Normal school
