= Jugend debattiert international =

German-language debating competition for students

Jugend debattiert international is a German-language debating competition for students based on the national German pupils' contest Jugend debattiert. As of 2025, participating countries include Belgium, Bulgaria, Croatia, Czech Republic, Estonia, France, Greece, Hungary, Italy, Latvia, Lithuania, Luxembourg, Netherlands, Poland, Romania, Slovakia, Sweden, Turkey (currently paused), and Ukraine.

The project is funded by the Goethe-Institut, the Foundation "Remembrance, Responsibility and Future", the Hertie Foundation and the Central Agency for German Schools Abroad (Zentralstelle für das Auslandsschulwesen). There are local supporters in three countries: In Czech Republic, the project is supported by the Czech-German Future Fund, in Lithuania, by the Lithuanian Information and Technology Center for students. In Poland, Jugend debattiert international is supported by the Foundation for Polish-German Cooperation.

== The Competition ==
The competition helps young people in Central and Eastern Europe to advocate their opinions, represents and promotes the German language as a medium of debate. Beyond supporting language acquisition, it strengthens conversation skills and promotes a deeper understanding of democracy. Thus the project not only encourages democracy, but also works towards the formation of an international young elite. The debates revolve around topics such as school life, fundamental rights, history (especially historical experiences of injustice), and Europe. Jugend debattiert international targets students from 10th grade onwards who master German at least to the level of B2 of the Common European Framework of Reference.

In 2015/16 more than 2300 students at 157 schools took part in the competition. The project is integrated into the curriculum. In class students are trained in the rules of debating and enter the competition on a school level. The best students compete the next stages of the competition: school district and national level. The winners (first and second) from each of the eight countries will finally compete in the international finale. Since the fourth international finale 2010 in Berlin, the winners of the German competition Jugend debattiert support them as advisors.

== Structure and evaluation of the debates ==
The format of the debate is strictly set up: Four students, two on the pro side, two on the contra side, debate for 24 minutes in German language on socio-political issues (e.g., "Should Turkey accede to the European Union?"). The debate starts with an opening round in which every participant has two minutes to outline his or her position. In the following twelve minutes the four debaters can exchange their arguments without strict regulations. During the final round the participants have one minute each to reflect on the arguments and summarize their final position in the light of the debate. A jury of three evaluates the debate according to the following points: expertise, eloquence, conversational competence and persuasiveness. Language skills are not included in the assessment.

== History ==
Jugend debattiert international was first carried out in Poland and the Czech Republic in 2005. Since 2006, schools in Estonia, Latvia, Lithuania and Ukraine have been taking part in the project. In 2009 Moscow and Saint Petersburg joined the competition after a two-year pilot phase. In 2007, students from all seven countries and Germany met for the first international finale in Prague under the auspices of the former president of Czech Republic, Václav Havel. Winners of the first international finale were Jakub Štefela from Liberec, Czech Republic and Peer Klüßendorf from Rostock, Germany. The Second international finale took place in October 2008 in Warsaw under the auspices of the Sejm Marshal of the Republic of Poland, Mr. Bronislaw Komorowski. Barbara Wasilewska from Warsaw, Poland and Wiebke Neelsen from Wismar, Germany, won this competition. In February 2010 the third international finale took place in Prague. Jitka Rutrlová from Prague, Czech Republic and Maximilian Behrens from Münster, Germany, were the winners of the final debate. The fourth international finale was held in Berlin in November 2010. Irina Avdeeva from Russia was awarded first place in competition 2009/2010 after the final debate. In 2011 the international final took place for the fifth time in Kyiv, Ukraine. Annett Lymar from Estonia won the final debate. In 2012 the sixth international final was won by the Hungarian student Gréta Szabó from Budapest. The international final was held for the seventh time in 2013 in Budapest. Dominika Perlínová from the Czech Republic was announced as the international winner. The 8th international final took place in Warsaw. Anastasija Minitš from Estonia won this year's competition. In 2015 the international finale was held for the 9th time in Latvian capital Riga. The international winner was Anna Ryan from Hungary. From 2016 on, Slovakia and Slovenia take part in the project. In this year the international final took place in Prague and Khoi Nguyen won in his hometown.

International Finals

Final	Topic of the Debate	Patronage/Guests of Honour	Winner
I. International Final Prague (Czech Republic), 05.10.2007	"Should the EU establish to sanction the denial of genocide?"	Václav Havel, former President of the Czech Republic / Wolfgang Thierse, Vice President of the German Bundestag	Jakub Štefela, Liberec (Czech Republic) und Peer Klüßendorf, Rostock (Germany)
II. International Final Warsaw (Poland), 24.10.2008	"Should national history teaching books be replaced by European ones?"	Bronisław Komorowski, Sejm-Marshal of Poland / Gerda Hasselfeldt, Vice President of the German Bundestag	Barbara Wasilewska, Warsaw (Poland) und Wiebke Neelsen, Wismar (Germany)
III. International Final Prague (Czech Republic), 26.02.2010	"Should August 23 be made a European-wide day of remembrance for the victims of totalitarian and authoritarian regimes?"	Václav Havel, former Prezident of the Czech Republic / Petra Pau, Vice President of the German Bundestag	Jitka Rutrlová, Prague (Czech Republic) und Maximilian Behrens, Münster (Germany)
IV. International Final Berlin (Germany), 12.11.2010	"Should all European cities be covered under Google Street View?"	guest of honor: Secretary of State Harro Semmler, Director of the German Bundestag	Irina Avdeeva, Moscow (Russia)
V. International Final Kyiv (Ukraine), 21.10.2011	"Should all EU countries legally determine nuclear phase-out any time soon?"	Vitali Klitschko / Hans-Jürgen Heimsoeth, Ambassador of the Federal Republic of Germany in Ukraine	Annett Lymar, Viljandi (Estonia)
VI. International Final Vilnius (Lithuania), 19.10.2012	"Should the EU establish to sanction hate speeches against religion?"	patronage: Emanuelis Zingeris, chairman of the foreign committee in Lithuanian Parliament	Gréta Szabó, Budapest (Hungary)
VII. International Final Budapest (Hungary), 18.10.2013	"Should countries decline to participate in international sporting events to protest against violations of human rights in the host country?"	patronage: Viktor Kassai, Hungarian referee (soccer) and 2011 World's Best Referee	Dominika Perlínová, Prague (Czech Republic)
VIII. International Final Warsaw (Poland), 17.10.2014	"Should extremist parties be banned?"	patronage: Władysław Bartoszewski, Secretary of State, Special Representative of the Prime Minister for International Dialogue	Anastasija Minitš, Tallinn (Estonia)
IX. International Final Riga (Latvia), 23.10.2015	"Should all member countries of the Council of Europe take a minimum number of refugees every year?"	patronage: Andris Bērziņš, former President of Latvia	Anna Ryan, Budapest (Hungary)
X. International Final Prague (Czech Republic), 23.09.2016	"Should the proof of state-organized doping exclude this country from international competitions?"	patronage: Karel Schwarzenberg, former foreign minister of the Czech Republic	Khoi Nguyen, Prague (Czech Republic)
