= Roszków =

Roszków may refer to the following places in Poland:

- Roszków, Greater Poland Voivodeship
- Roszków, Silesian Voivodeship
