= Spradlin =

Spradlin may refer to:

- Chris Spradlin (born 1979), American professional wrestler, known under the ring name Chris Hero
- Danny Spradlin (born 1959), American football player
- G. D. Spradlin (1920–2011), American actor
- Jerry Spradlin (born 1967), retired professional baseball player
- Kim Spradlin (born 1983), bridal shop owner from San Antonio, Texas, winner of 2012's Survivor: One World
- Michael Spradlin, the New York Times Bestselling and Edgar Award-nominated author
- Preston Spradlin, American basketball coach

== See also ==
- Radlin (disambiguation)
- Spiradoline
