= Roszkówko =

Roszkówko may refer to the following places:

- Roszkówko, Jarocin County in Greater Poland Voivodeship (west-central Poland)
- Roszkówko, Rawicz County in Greater Poland Voivodeship (west-central Poland)
- Roszkówko, Wągrowiec County in Greater Poland Voivodeship (west-central Poland)
