= Stanisław Taczak =

Polish general

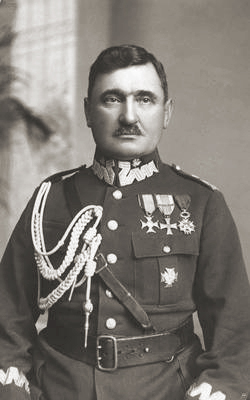
Stanisław Taczak

Stanisław Taczak (8 April 1874, Mieszków (now in Jarocin County) – 2 March 1960, Malbork) was a Polish general.

Taczak was born in Mieszków, near Jarocin in 1874. His father was Andrzej Taczak, an innkeeper. He had a sister and five brothers, two of whom became priests and Taczak also studied theology. He went on to become a metallurgical engineer in 1897. In 1909 he became a lieutenant in the German Army reserve and served in the First World War, being promoted to captain in 1915.

Until 8 January 1919, he was temporary commander-in-chief of the Great Poland Uprising (1918–1919).

After the invasion of Poland in 1939, he was imprisoned in the Oflag VII-A Murnau POW camp in Germany.

== Honours and awards ==
- Silver Cross of the Virtuti Militari
- Commander's Cross of the Order of Polonia Restituta
- Cross of Independence
- Cross of Valour (twice)
- Knight's Cross of the Legion of Honour (France)
