= Mieszków, Greater Poland Voivodeship =

Mieszków
- Village
- Location within Poland
- Coordinates: 52°1′25″N 17°27′56″E
- Country: Poland
- Voivodeship: Greater Poland
- County: Jarocin
- Gmina: Jarocin
- Population: 1,700

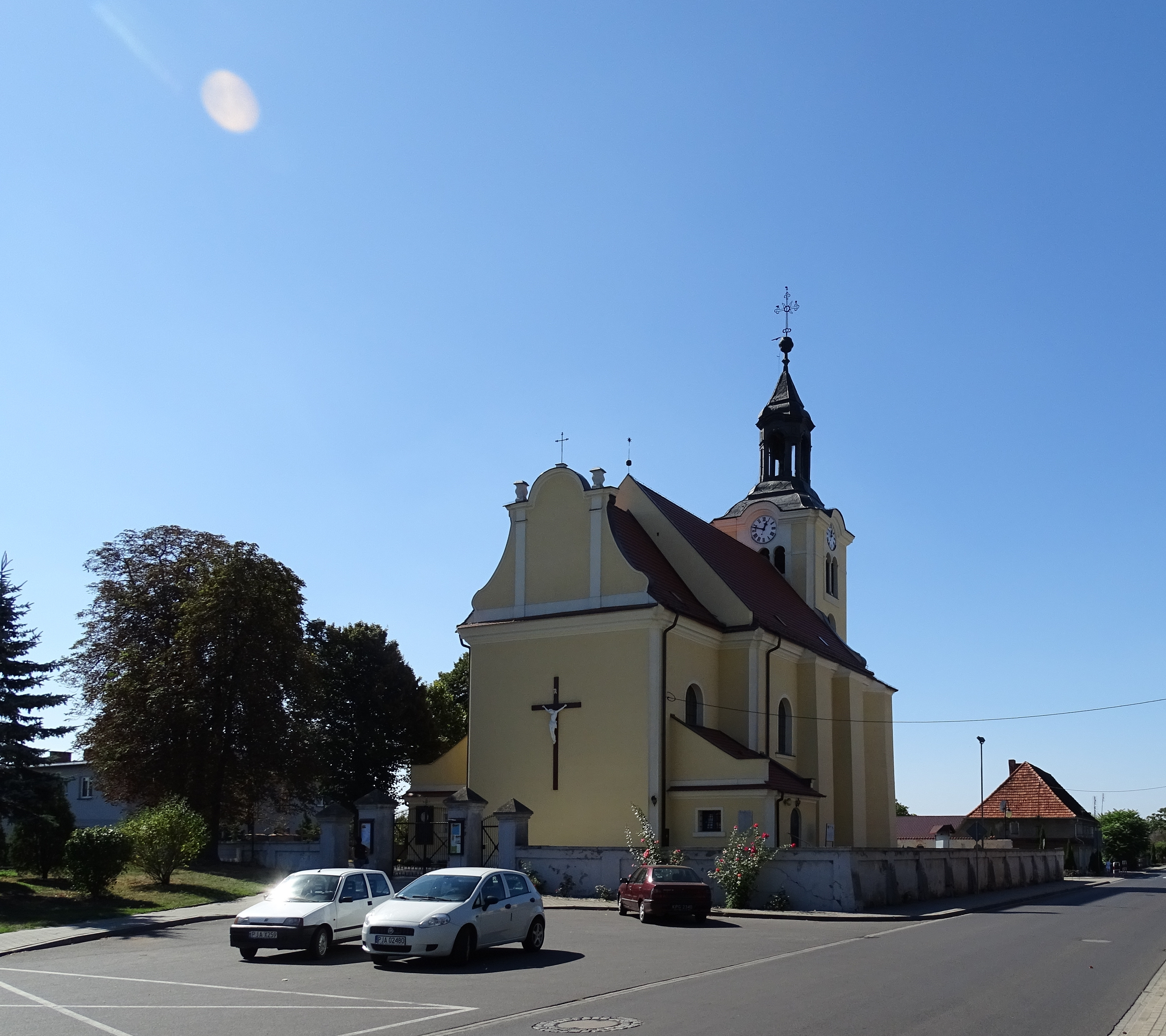
Parish church from 1767.

Mieszków [ˈmjɛʂkuf] is a village in the administrative district of Gmina Jarocin, within Jarocin County, Greater Poland Voivodeship, in west-central Poland.

== History ==
In 1891 owner of Mieszków was Władysław Taczanowski.

With the invasion of Poland and the outbreak of the Second World War in September 1939, Mieszków was occupied by Nazi Germany. It was renamed Halbstadt and then Mühlenfelde. The town was administered as part of the district or county (kreis) of Jarotschin within the Reichsgau Wartheland. Following the arrival of the Red Army in January 1945 and the end of the war, it became part of the People's Republic of Poland.

Stanisław Taczak (1874–1960) was born in Mieszków.
