= Wilczyniec, Greater Poland Voivodeship =

Wilczyniec
- Village
- Location within Poland
- Coordinates: 51°54′N 17°35′E
- Country: Poland
- Voivodeship: Greater Poland
- County: Jarocin
- Gmina: Jarocin

Wilczyniec [vilˈt͡ʂɨɲɛt͡s] is a village in the administrative district of Gmina Jarocin, within Jarocin County, Greater Poland Voivodeship, in west-central Poland.
