= Kadziak =

- Village
- Location within Poland
- Coordinates: 52°01′17″N 17°35′15″E
- Country: Poland
- Voivodeship: Greater Poland
- County: Jarocin
- Gmina: Jarocin

Kadziak [ˈkad͡ʑak] is a village in the administrative district of Gmina Jarocin, within Jarocin County, Greater Poland Voivodeship, in west-central Poland.
