= Golina, Jarocin County =

Golina
- Village
- Location within Poland
- Coordinates: 51°54′41″N 17°28′15″E
- Country: Poland
- Voivodeship: Greater Poland
- County: Jarocin
- Gmina: Jarocin
- Population: 1,700

Golina [ɡɔˈlina] is a village in the administrative district of Gmina Jarocin, within Jarocin County, Greater Poland Voivodeship, in west-central Poland.
