= Gmina Jarocin, Greater Poland Voivodeship =

Gmina Jarocin Jarocin Commune
- Gmina
- Coat of arms
- Interactive map of Gmina Jarocin
- Coordinates (Jarocin): 51°58′N 17°30′E
- Country: Poland
- Voivodeship: Greater Poland
- County: Jarocin
- Seat: Jarocin

Area
  - Total: 200.23 km^{2} (77.31 sq mi)

Population (2006)
  - Total: 44,430
  - Density: 221.9/km^{2} (574.7/sq mi)
  - Urban: 25,834
  - Rural: 18,596
- Website: https://www.jarocin.pl/gmina.html

Gmina Jarocin is an urban-rural gmina (administrative district) in Jarocin County, Greater Poland Voivodeship, in west-central Poland. Its seat is the town of Jarocin, which lies approximately 63 kilometres (39 mi) south-east of the regional capital Poznań.

The gmina covers an area of 200.23 square kilometres (77.3 sq mi), and as of 2006 its total population is 44,430 (out of which the population of Jarocin amounts to 25,834, and the population of the rural part of the gmina is 18,596).

== Villages ==
Apart from the town of Jarocin, Gmina Jarocin contains the villages and settlements of Annapol, Bachorzew, Cielcza, Ciświca, Cząszczew, Dąbrowa, Golina, Hilarów, Kadziak, Kąty, Łuszczanów, Mieszków, Osiek, Potarzyca, Prusy, Radlin, Roszków, Roszkówko, Siedlemin, Stefanów, Tarce, Wilczyniec, Wilkowyja, Witaszyce, Witaszyczki and Zakrzew.

== Neighbouring gminas ==
Gmina Jarocin is bordered by the gminas of Dobrzyca, Jaraczewo, Kotlin, Koźmin Wielkopolski, Nowe Miasto nad Wartą and Żerków.
