= Potarzyca, Jarocin County =

Potarzyca
- Village
- Location within Poland
- Coordinates: 51°55′N 17°25′E
- Country: Poland
- Voivodeship: Greater Poland
- County: Jarocin
- Gmina: Jarocin
- Population: 800

Potarzyca [pɔtaˈʐɨt͡sa] is a village in the administrative district of Gmina Jarocin, within Jarocin County, Greater Poland Voivodeship, in west-central Poland.

== Planetarium ==
In Potarzyca, is a gymnasium, situated in a planetarium. It is a self-made projector made by Andrzej Owczarek, a technical teacher, in 1993 year. It may be one of the few professional planetariums in a European village.
