= Zabełków =

- Village
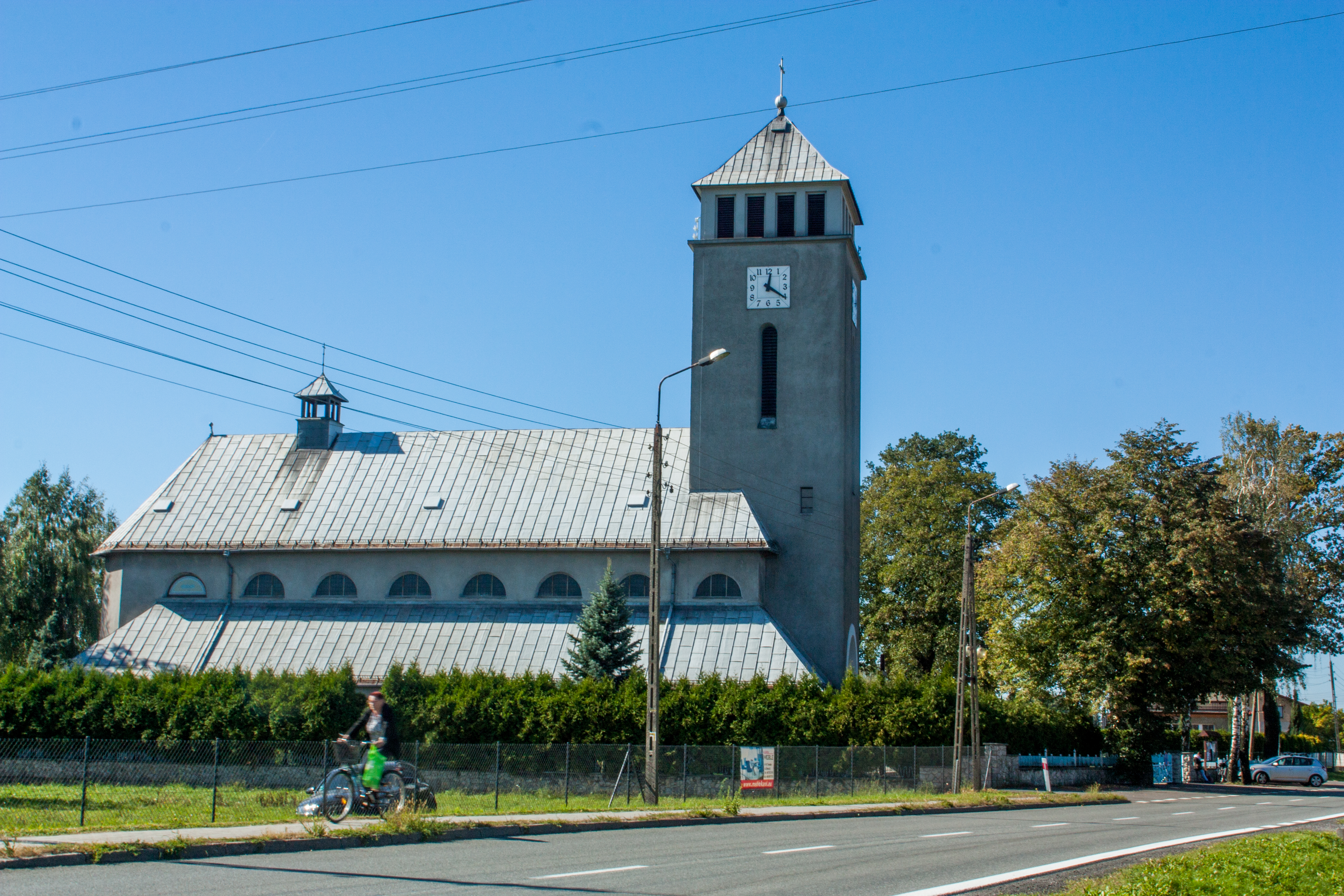
- Saint Hedwig Church

- Location within Poland
- Coordinates: 49°56′N 18°20′E
- Country: Poland
- Voivodeship: Silesian
- County: Racibórz
- Gmina: Krzyżanowice
- Website: http://www.zabelkow.pl

Zabełków [zaˈbɛu̯kuf] is a village in the administrative district of Gmina Krzyżanowice, within Racibórz County, Silesian Voivodeship, in southern Poland, close to the Czech border.

Józef Rymer, first Silesian voivode, was born here.
