= Stefanów, Jarocin County =

Stefanów
- Village
- Location within Poland
- Coordinates: 51°55′06″N 17°30′12″E
- Country: Poland
- Voivodeship: Greater Poland
- County: Jarocin
- Gmina: Jarocin

Stefanów [stɛˈfanuf] is a village in the administrative district of Gmina Jarocin, within Jarocin County, Greater Poland Voivodeship, in west-central Poland.
