= Witaszyce =

- Village
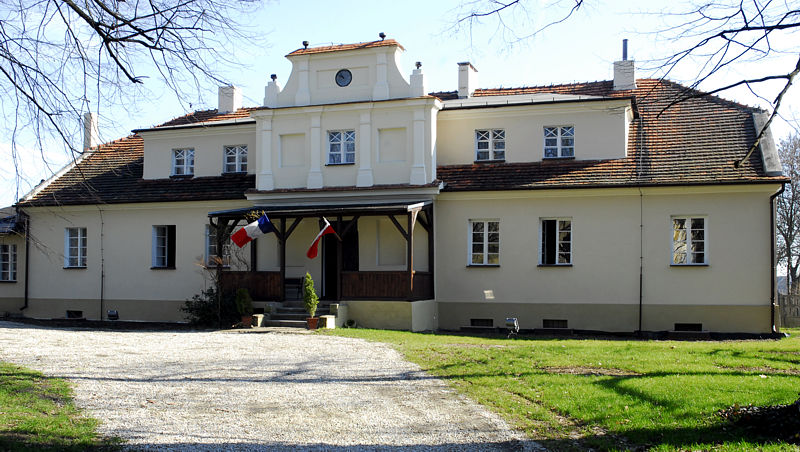
- Museum of Napoleonic Wars

- Location within Poland
- Coordinates: 51°56′N 17°34′E
- Country: Poland
- Voivodeship: Greater Poland
- County: Jarocin
- Gmina: Jarocin
- Elevation: 128.896 m (422.89 ft)

Population
  - Total: 4,300

Witaszyce [vitaˈʂɨt͡sɛ] is a village in the administrative district of Gmina Jarocin, within Jarocin County, Greater Poland Voivodeship, in west-central Poland.
