= Tarce =

- Village
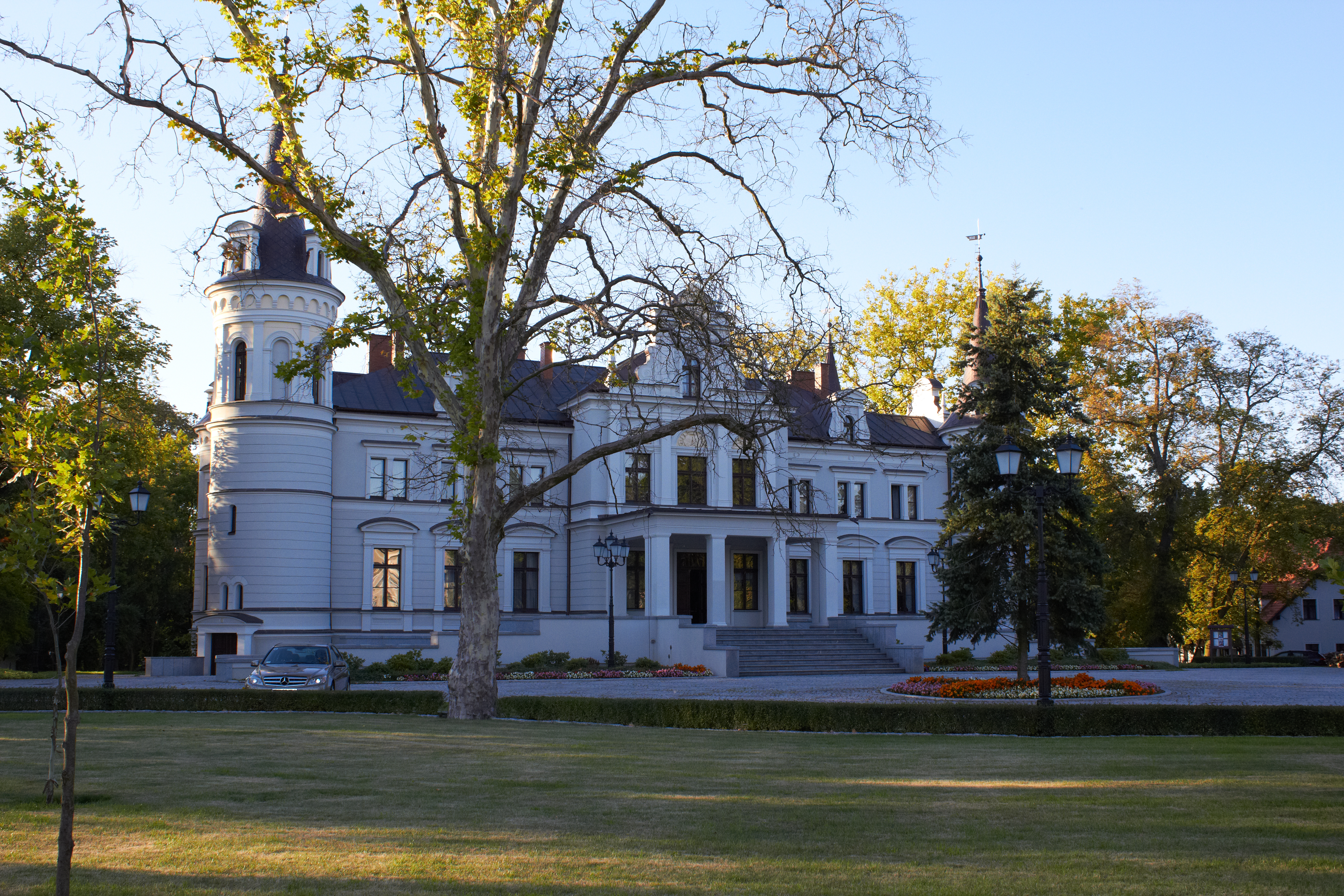
- Tarce Palace

- Location within Poland
- Coordinates: 52°0′N 17°36′E
- Country: Poland
- Voivodeship: Greater Poland
- County: Jarocin
- Gmina: Jarocin

Tarce [ˈtart͡sɛ] is a village in the administrative district of Gmina Jarocin, within Jarocin County, Greater Poland Voivodeship, in west-central Poland.
