= Dąbrowa, Jarocin County =

Dąbrowa
- Village
- Location within Poland
- Coordinates: 51°57′27″N 17°24′52″E
- Country: Poland
- Voivodeship: Greater Poland
- County: Jarocin
- Gmina: Jarocin

Dąbrowa [dɔmˈbrɔva] is a village in the administrative district of Gmina Jarocin, within Jarocin County, Greater Poland Voivodeship, in west-central Poland.
