= Cząszczew =

- Village
- Location within Poland
- Coordinates: 52°00′21″N 17°26′38.4″E
- Country: Poland
- Voivodeship: Greater Poland
- County: Jarocin
- Gmina: Jarocin

Cząszczew [ˈt͡ʂɔ̃ʂt͡ʂɛf] is a village in the administrative district of Gmina Jarocin, within Jarocin County, Greater Poland Voivodeship, in west-central Poland.
