= Zakrzew, Greater Poland Voivodeship =

Zakrzew
- Village
- Location within Poland
- Coordinates: 51°55′N 17°32′E
- Country: Poland
- Voivodeship: Greater Poland
- County: Jarocin
- Gmina: Jarocin
- Elevation: 128.784 m (422.52 ft)

Zakrzew [ˈzakʂɛf] is a village in the administrative district of Gmina Jarocin, within Jarocin County, Greater Poland Voivodeship, in west-central Poland.
