= Antoni Wysocki =

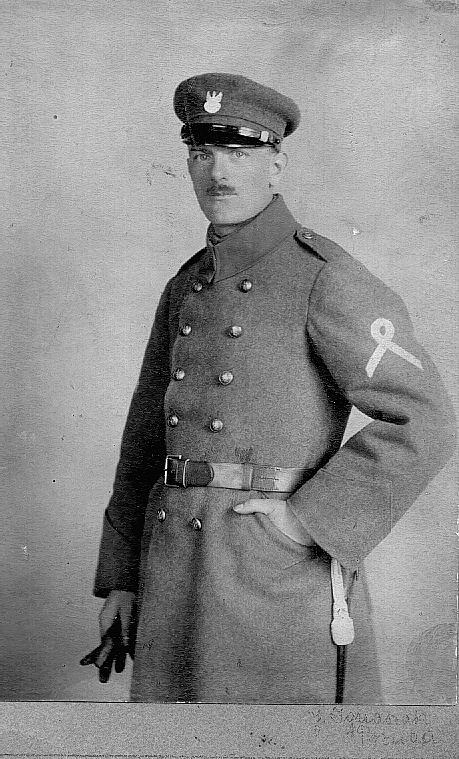
Antoni Wysocki

Antoni Wysocki (May 25, 1884 – October 22, 1940) was a Polish military commander. He was a member of the Greater Poland Uprising, the commander of the Wilda military campaign, which was the first to reach the Bazar Hotel on the day of the outbreak of the insurrection.

== Biography ==
Antoni Wysocki was born on May 25, 1884, in Poznań. He was a son of Michal (a saddler) and Maria Stępniak. From 1902 to 1904 he was learning to become a printer. He obtained the vocational certificate and worked in the vocation until the outbreak of the I World War.

In August 1912, he started to organize the first scout teams in Poznań. Initially, these groups went under the name of Towarzystwo Gier i Zabaw dla Młodzieży “Zorza” (The Association of Games and Fun for the Youth “The Dawn”), later Towarzystwo Skautów “Zorza” (The Association of Scouts “The Dawn”), and finally the name got shortened to Hufiec “Zorza” (“The Dawn” Regiment). Wysocki became the commander of the regiment.

In 1914, Wysocki became very active in Towarzystwo Gimnastyczne “Sokół” (The Gymnastic Association “The Falcon”). Among the authorities of the association, he represented the independent way of thinking (in contrast to the legalistic one). In January 1914, a new organization emerged from the Gymnastic Association. Its name was Towarzystwo Gier i Zabaw Ruchowych "Zorza" (The Association of Games and Physical Activities “The Dawn”). The aim of this organization was to promote physical activities and education. Wysocki was the initiator of this organization. One of the members of the committee was Salomea Kleps, who later became Wysocki's wife.

In the years 1914–1915, he was the cofounder of Tajna Organizacja Niepodległościowa (The Secret Organization for the Independence).

Shortly after the beginning of World War I, Wysocki was recruited to the Prussian Army and fought in the Eastern Front. In 1916 he was nominated to the rank of a non-commissioned officer.

In 1916, the organization of Główna Kwatera Skautowa na Rzeszę Niemiecką (The Scouts Headquarters for the Third Reich) came into being. Its aim was to unite all separately working scout teams. The organization was joined by all scout teams except for Hufiec „Zorza” (“The Dawn” Regiment) under Wysocki's command. Wysocki did not want to lose autonomy and, contrary to other teams, he focused attention on military education and training rather than to educational work.

In August 1918 Hufiec “Zorza” (“The Dawn” Regiment) led by Wysocki joined Polska Organizacja Wojskowa (Polish Military Organization) and received the order to invigilate sappers’ barracks in the district of Wilda and the railway storehouses. Soon afterwards Wysocki was nominated to the commander of the Wilda district in Poznań. He also became a member of the police-military commission of Rada Ludowa m. Poznania (The People's Council of Poznań).

== Participation in the Greater Poland Uprising ==
A month before the outbreak of the Greater Poland Uprising, Wysocki took part in the first session of Polska Komenda Straży Obywatelskiej (Polish Civic Guard Headquarters) in Poznań. In anticipation of the beginning of the fights, he was nominated the military commander of the Poznań-Wilda district.

On December 27, 1918, Wysocki led the 100-men military campaign from wildecka kompania Straży Ludowej (Wilda's People's Guard). His contingent was the first to reach the Bazar Hotel. Afterwards, he participated in the seizure of the sappers’ barracks in Wilda.

On January 6, 1919, he took part in the seizure of the airbase in Ławica in Poznań.

== Activity after the Greater Poland Uprising ==
In April 1919, when the Greater Poland Uprising was over, Wysocki was nominated to the commander of II baon Straży Ludowej (The Second Contingent of the People's Guard). Following the organizational changes, he moved to Obrona Krajowa (Domestic Defense). In June, he was nominated to the rank of second lieutenant. In the years 1919-1922 he served in the second contingent of the Domestic Defense and later formations of this contingent.

Between 20 and 25 August 1920 he participated in the Second Silesian Uprising.

On March 5, 1921, he was nominated to lieutenant.

Between May 3 and July 5, 1921, he participated in the Third Silesian Uprising.

In 1935 he was a junior department- officer in the department of control in the Greater Poland Military Museum in Poznań. He was a deputy director of Karol Marcinkowski and a very active member of the Greater Poland Uprising veterans’ organizations. He published Zarys historii Towarzystw Powstańców (‘The Outline of the History of Insurgents Associations”) in Jednodniówka Powstańca Wielkopolskiego (The Insurgents Magazine). He also stayed in touch with Poznań scouting. In August 1935, he chaired the annual ceremony of the Insurgents and Soldiers Association. He gave a speech about the heroic fights of the Polish Army against Bolsheviks.

== World War II ==
On September 4, 1939, Wysocki removed himself from Poznań along with Armia Poznań to the east banks of the Vistula. He was in charge of a convoy of cars to Lviv, which was being organized as the transfer spot by the Greater Poland-Pomerania Committee. It was meant to be the transfer location for the Polish people through the Hungarian and Romanian borders. On September 20, 1939, he participated in the defense of Lviv. He was the deputy commander of the assault troops.

On October 5, 1939, Wysocki was captured by Soviet authorities - NKVD. On August 2, 1940, he was tried in Lviv. Wysocki was sentenced to death by shooting on the basis of articles 54-2 (charge: armed uprising or armed invasion on the soviet territory, taking over the power) and 54-11 (charge: organized activities aiming to take over the power) of the penal code of the Ukrainian Soviet Socialist Republic.

Before the execution Wysocki was being kept in prison no 2. in Lviv. The execution took place on October 22, 1940.

== Honors ==
- Cross of Independence
- Cross of Valor
- Śląski Krzyż Powstańczy (Silesian Uprisings Cross)
- Srebrny Krzyż Zasługi (Silver Cross of Merit)

== Bibliography ==
- Powstanie Wielkopolskie 1918-1919 - zarys dziejów - Antoni Czubiński, Zdzisław Grot, Benon Miśkiewicz - Państwowe Wydawnictwo Naukowe, Poznań 1978
- Wilda–dzielnica Poznania 1253-1939 – Magdalena Mrugalska-Banaszak – Wydawnictwo Miejskie, Poznań 1999
- Z postępowych tradycji oręża polskiego 1917-1939 - Ignacy Pawłowski - Wydawnictwo Ministerstwa Obrony Narodowej, Warszawa 1966
- Wielkopolska w walce o niepodległość 1918-1919 - Leszek Grot, Ignacy Pawłowski, Michał Pirko - Wydawnictwo Ministerstwa Obrony Narodowej, Warszawa 1968
- Dokumenty Obrony Lwowa 1939 – Artur Leinwand – Instytut Lwowski, Warszawa 1997
