= Radlin =

Radlin may refer to:

- Radlin, Silesian Voivodeship, a town in Wodzisław County (south Poland)
- Radlin II, a district of Wodzisław Śląski (south Poland)
- Radlin, Lublin Voivodeship, a village (east Poland)
- Radlin, Świętokrzyskie Voivodeship, a village (south-central Poland)
- Radlin, Greater Poland Voivodeship, a village (west-central Poland)
