= Jarocin =

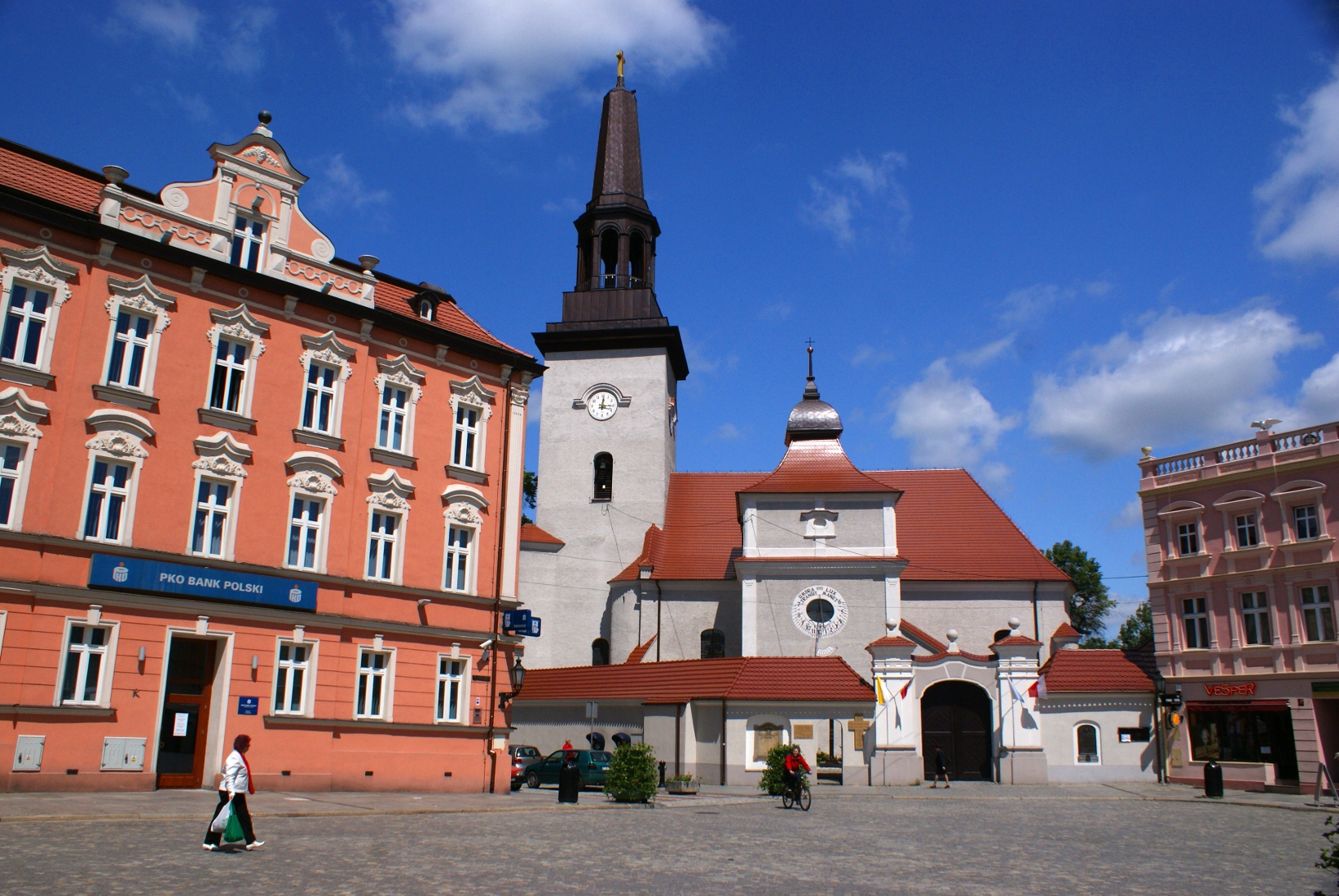
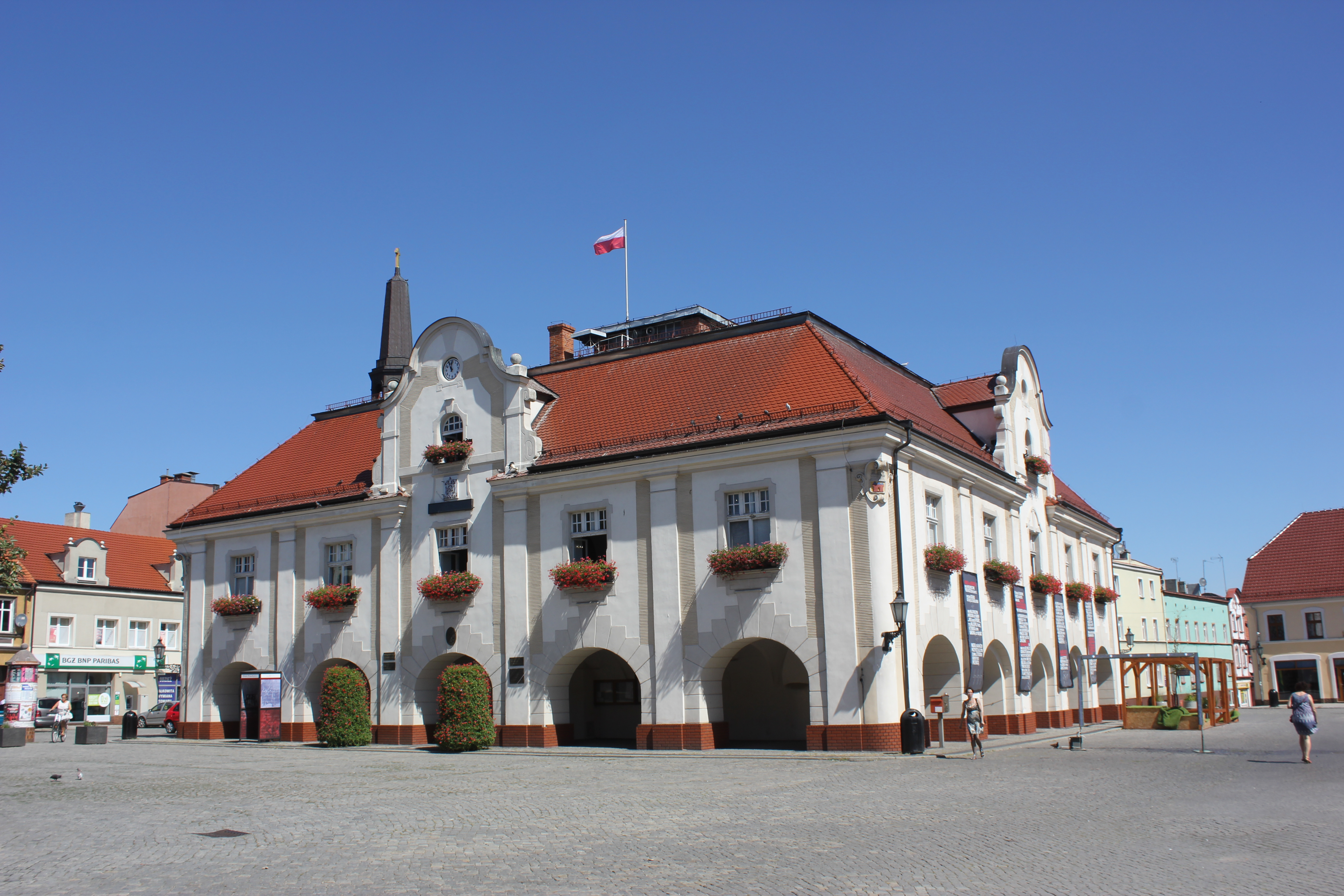
- St Martin's Church with marketplace (top) and town hall (bottom)

- Flag Coat of arms

- Location within Poland
- Coordinates: 51°58′N 17°30′E
- Country: Poland
- Voivodeship: Greater Poland
- County: Jarocin
- Gmina: Gmina Jarocin
- Established: 13th century
- Town rights: 1257

Government
  - Mayor: Urszula Wyremblewska-Korzyniewska

Area
  - Total: 14.44 km^{2} (5.58 sq mi)

Population (2025)
  - Total: 26,253
  - Density: 1,818/km^{2} (4,709/sq mi)
- Time zone: UTC+1 (CET)
  - Summer (DST): UTC+2 (CEST)
- Postal code: 63-200
- Area code: +48 62
- Car plates: PJA
- Climate: Cfb
- Website: http://www.jarocin.pl/

Jarocin (Polish pronunciation: [jaˈrɔt͡ɕin]) is a town in west-central Poland with 26,253 inhabitants (2024), the administrative capital of Jarocin County in Greater Poland Voivodeship.

Jarocin is a historical town, having been founded and granted city rights in the 13th century. The marketplace features a Ratusz town hall built between 1799 and 1804, which is now home to the Jarocin Regional Museum.

The town also became famous in the 1980s thanks to the Jarocin Festival, one of the first rock-punk music festivals of the former Warsaw Pact and in Europe. The first event was organised in 1980.

== Names ==
The town has medieval origins and is recorded as early as the 13th century. In 1257 it appeared as Iaroczino. In the 1600s, the town's name was already known as Jarocin. Jarocin's name in Yiddish is ירוטשין In german, town was called Kesselberg during the middle ages, and Jarotschin later.

== History ==
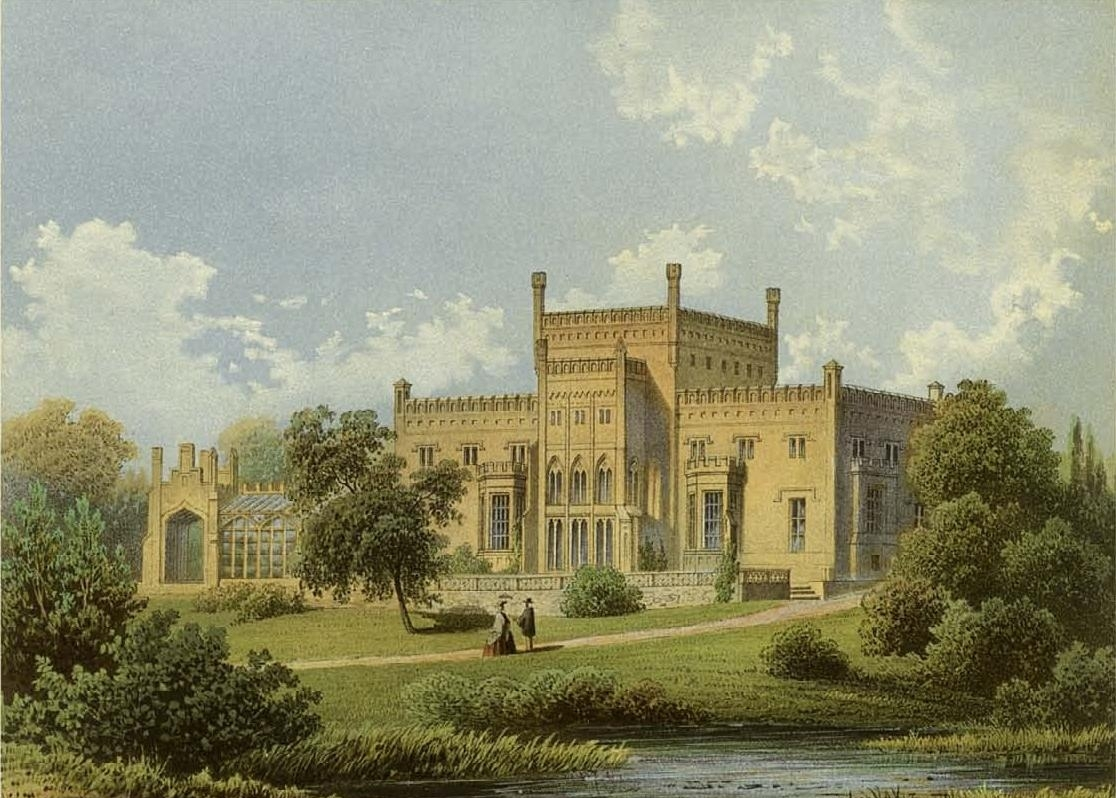
Radoliński Palace, a 19th century depiction

The lordship of Jarocin was first mentioned in a 1257 deed issued by Duke Bolesław the Pious of Greater Poland. The town was conveniently located at the intersection of the trade routes from Wrocław to Toruń and from Poznań to Kalisz.

It was a private town of Polish nobility, administratively located in the Pyzdry County in the Kalisz Voivodeship in the Greater Poland Province of the Kingdom of Poland.

Jarocin was annexed by the Kingdom of Prussia in the 1793 Second Partition of Poland and administered within the newly formed province of South Prussia. It was part of the Duchy of Warsaw from 1807–13 during the Napoleonic Wars, but was restored to Prussia afterwards. The town was included within the Grand Duchy of Posen from 1815 and the Province of Posen from 1848. It became part of the German Empire in 1871. In 1889 it was included within the newly created Jarotschin District of the Province of Posen.

Jarocin participated in the Greater Poland Uprising (1918–1919) and had the first soldiers' council in the Province of Posen. Polish insurgents captured the local military barracks and rail junction on November 8–9, 1918, just days before Poland declared independence on November 11. It was subsequently included in the Second Polish Republic. 42 Polish insurgents from Jarocin and nearby settlements were killed in the uprising. In the interbellum Jarocin was a county seat in the Poznań Voivodeship.

The town was annexed by Nazi Germany in 1939 during World War II and administered within the newly formed province Reichsgau Wartheland as part of the district or county (kreis) of Jarotschin. Poles arrested during the Intelligenzaktion were imprisoned in the local prison.

Many Polish citizens, especially Jews, were expelled and replaced with ethnic Germans from the Baltic states, Volhynia, and Bukovina in accordance with the German Lebensraum policy. Many inhabitants were also deported to forced labour in Germany. The Germans devastated the memorial at the mass grave of the fallen Polish insurgents of 1918–1919. A forced labor prison operated in the vicinity from January 1941 to January 1945.

Nevertheless, the Polish resistance movement was organized in the town, including the Secret Military Organization and structures of the Polish Underground State. Several resistance members were captured by the Germans and then sentenced to death and executed in Dresden in 1943. Following the arrival of the Red Army and the end of the war in 1945, Jarocin was restored to Poland with however, a Soviet-installed communist regime that stayed in power until the Fall of Communism in the 1980s. The devastated insurgents' tombstone was renovated in 1948.

It was administratively located in the Kalisz Voivodeship from 1975 to 1998. In 2016, town limits were slightly expanded by including a part of the village of Bachorzew.

== Sights ==
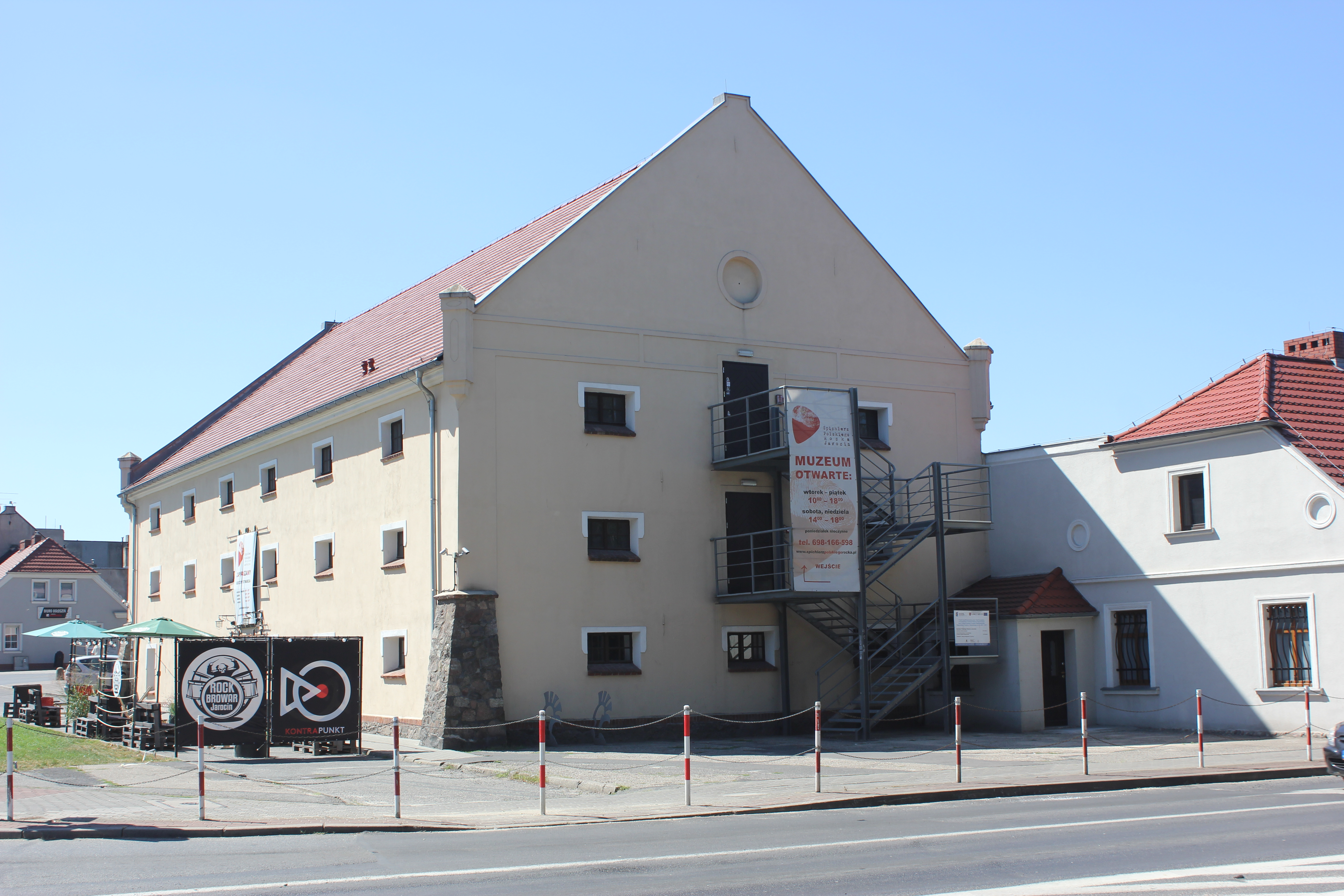
Polish Rock Granary, a museum dedicated to Polish rock music

Main landmarks and points of interest include the old Radoliński Palace with an adjacent park, the Polish Rock Granary, a museum dedicated to Polish rock music, the Rynek (Market Square) filled with historic architecture, including the town hall, which also houses the historic museum, and the St. Martin's Church, and several Greater Poland Uprising memorials.

== Sports ==
The town's most notable clubs are rugby union team Sparta Jarocin, which competes in the Ekstraliga (Poland's top division), and football team Jarota Jarocin, which competes in the lower leagues. The town has a parkrun event that meets in Radoliński Park.

== Education ==
- Wielkopolska Wyższa Szkoła Humanistyczno-Ekonomiczna w Jarocinie

== Twin towns ==
Jarocin is twinned with:

- Libercourt, France
- Veldhoven, Netherlands
- Hatvan, Hungary
- Schlüchtern, Germany
- Oleksandriia, Ukraine
- Korkuteli, Turkey

== Gallery ==
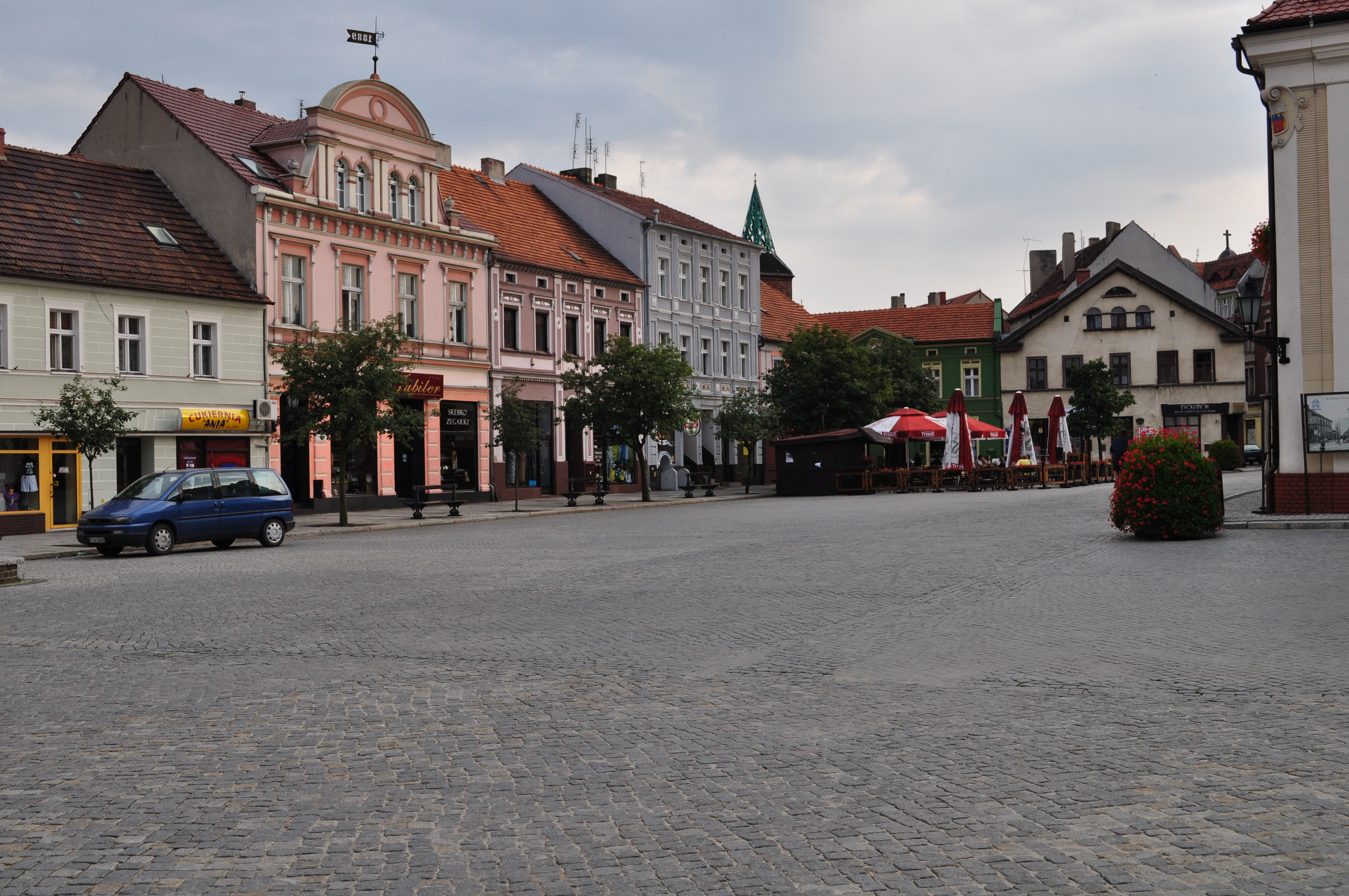
Rynek (Market Square) filled with colourful historic townhouses

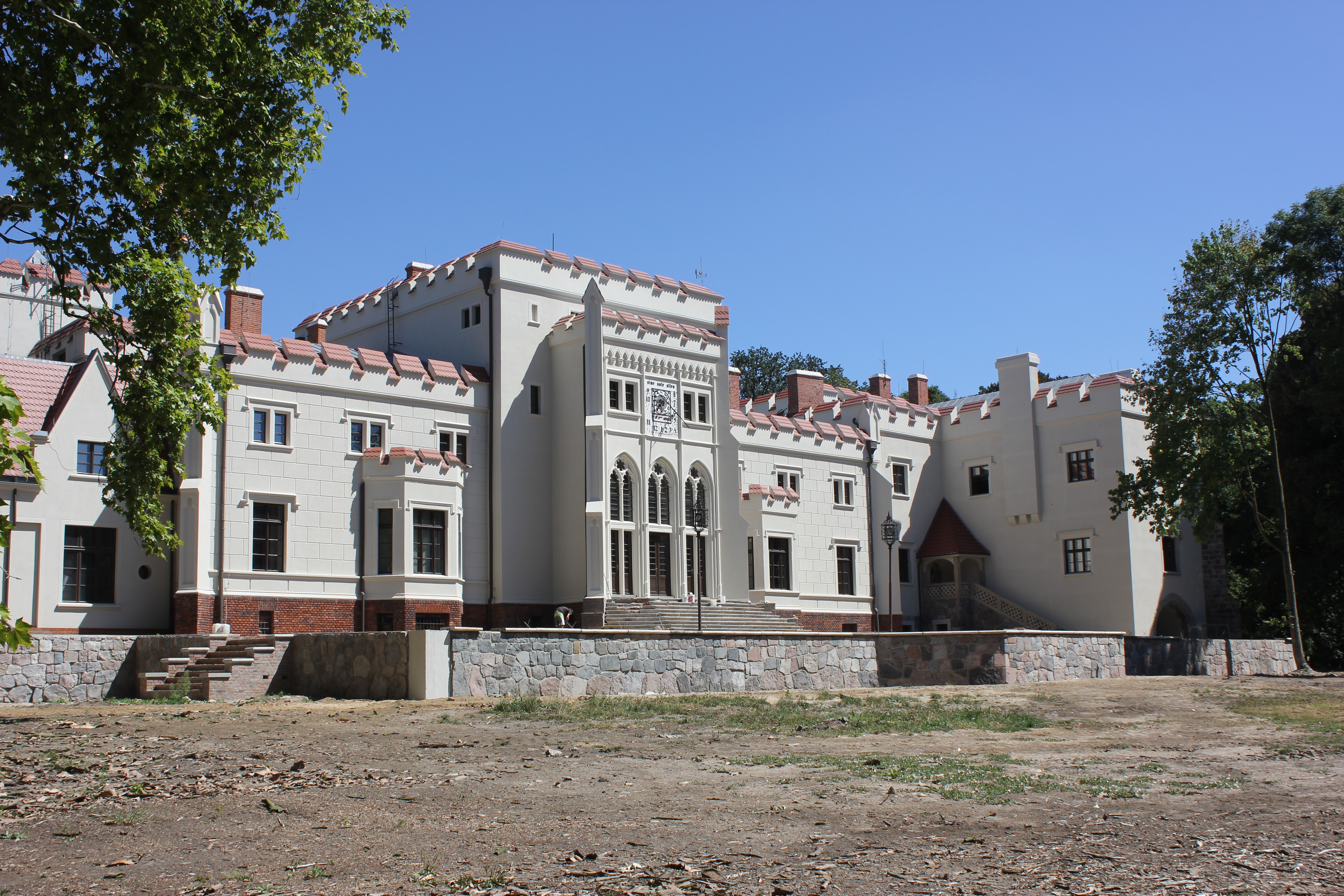
Radoliński Palace

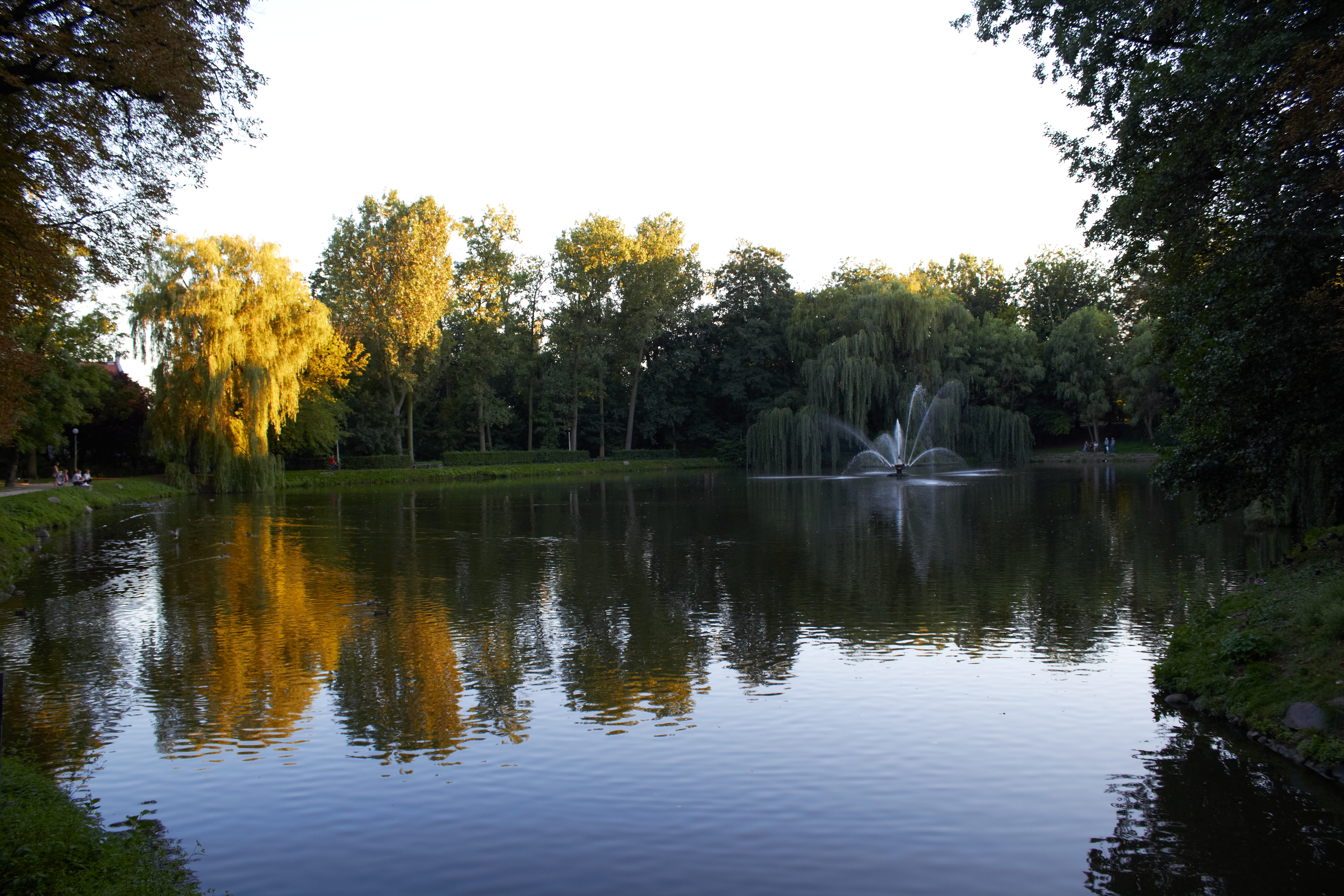
Radoliński Park

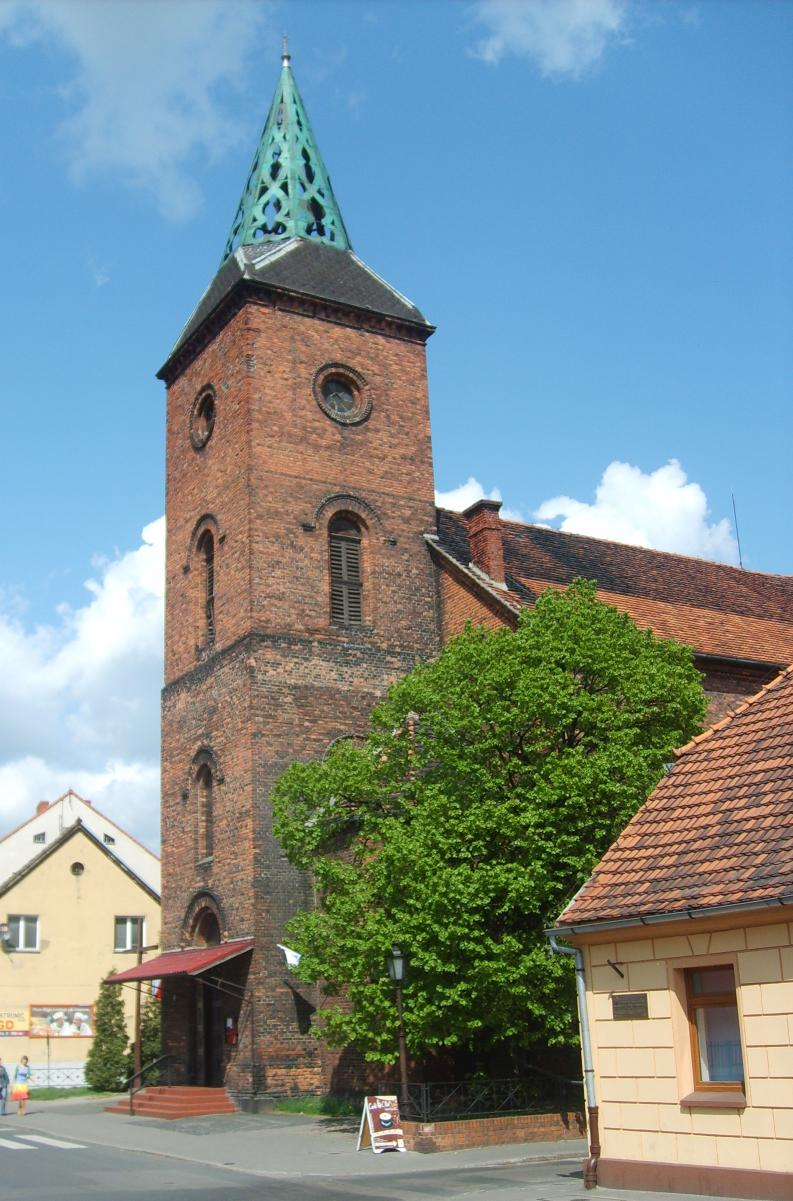
St. George Church

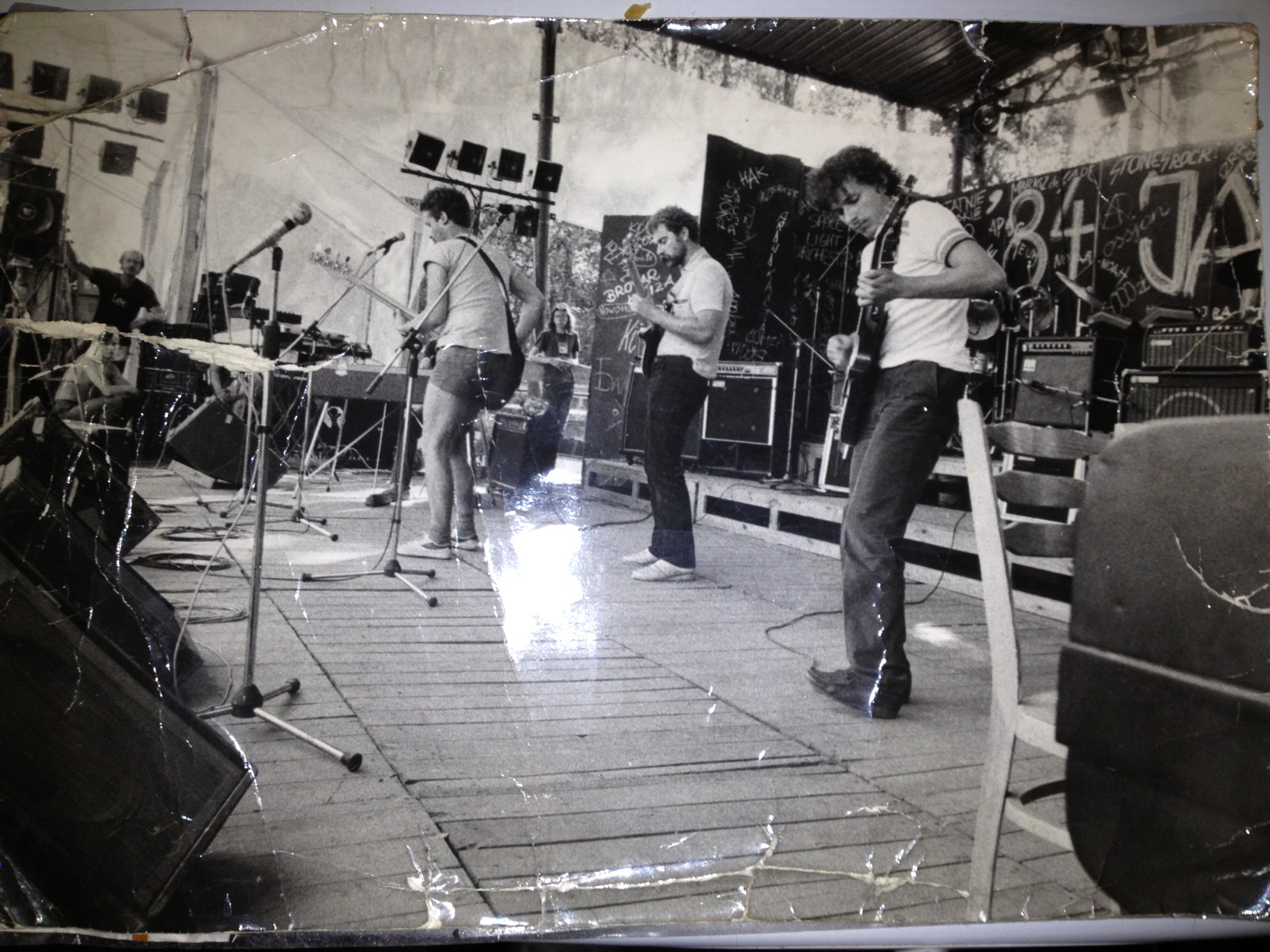
Jarocin Festival, 1984

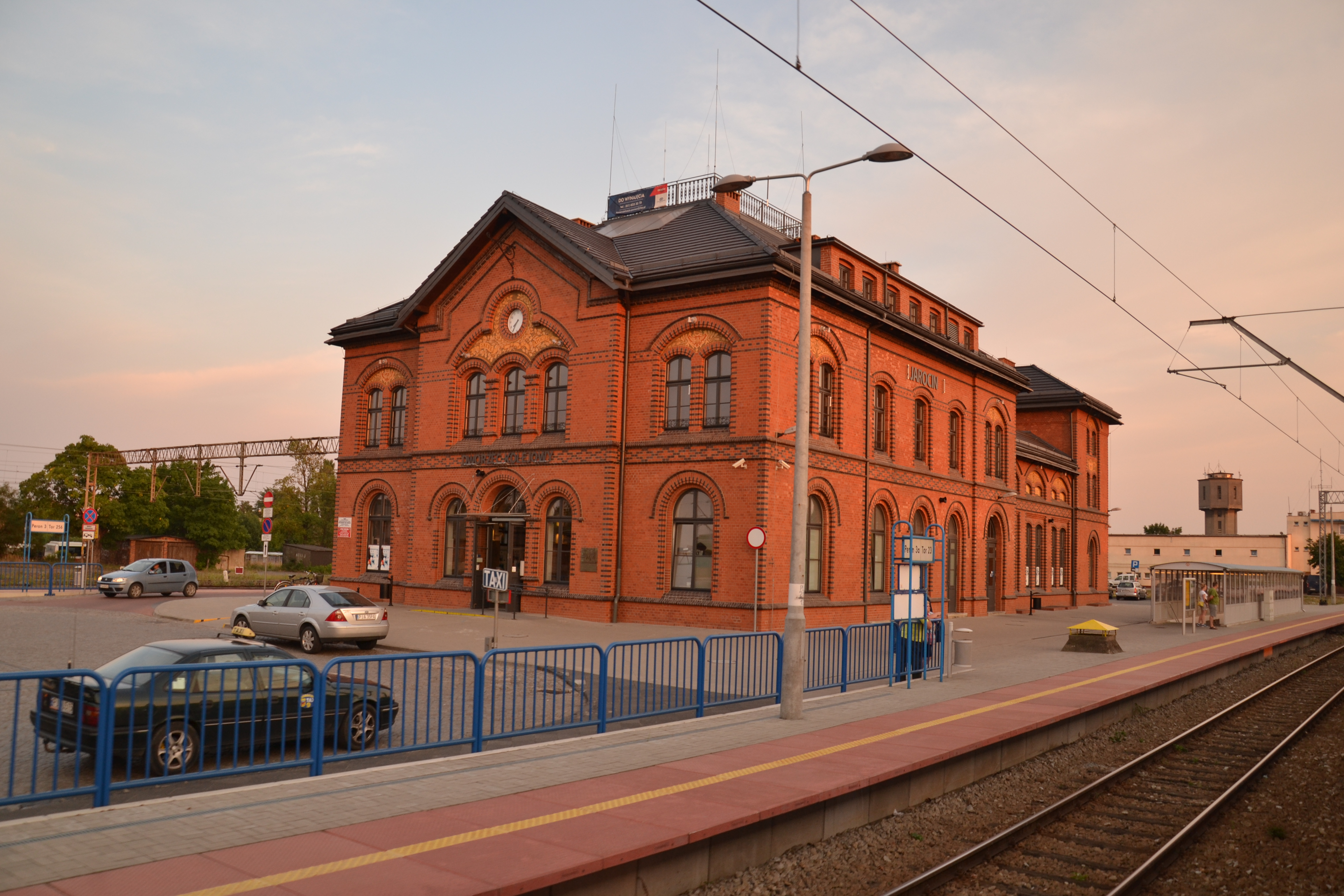
Railway station

== People ==
- Eduard Lasker (1829–1884), politician
- Gustav Wegner (1903–1942), German athlete
- Dame Elisabeth Schwarzkopf (1915–2006), operatic lyric soprano
- Czesław Madajczyk (1921–2008), Polish historian
- Sławomir Majusiak (born 1964), Polish long-distance runner
- Robert Baran (born 1994), Polish wrestler
