= Wilkowyja, Jarocin County =

Wilkowyja
- Village
- Location within Poland
- Coordinates: 52°0′N 17°32′E
- Country: Poland
- Voivodeship: Greater Poland
- County: Jarocin
- Gmina: Jarocin
- Population: 1,470
- Website: http://www.wilkowyja.cba.pl

Wilkowyja [vilkɔˈvɨja] is a village in the administrative district of Gmina Jarocin, within Jarocin County, Greater Poland Voivodeship, in west-central Poland.
