= Supreme People's Council (Prussian Poland) =

Polish political organisation in the German Empire

- Naczelna Rada Ludowa
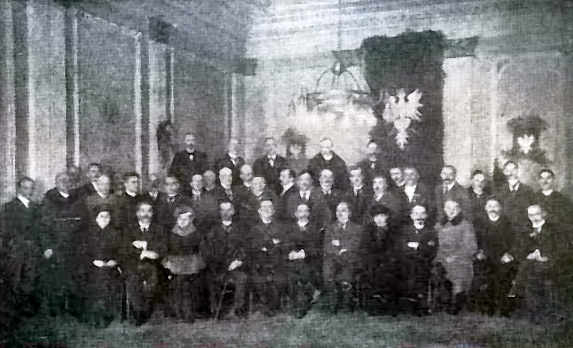
- Abbreviation: NRL
- Successor: Ministerstwo byłej Dzielnicy Pruskiej
- Established: 1916; 110 years ago
- Founded at: Posen, Province of Posen, German Empire
- Dissolved: August 19, 1919; 106 years ago
- Purpose: Promotion of Polish independence
- Region served: Prussian Partition
- Key people: Stanisław Adamski; Wojciech Korfanty; Józef Rymer
- Affiliations: Polish National Committee

The Supreme People's Council (Polish: Naczelna Rada Ludowa (NRL)) was a political organization in the Prussian Partition of Poland, which played a major role during the Greater Poland Uprising. It was established in 1916 in Poznań as an underground Interparty Committee (Polish: Komitet Międzypartyjny), also known as the Central Citizens’ Committee (Polish: Centralny Komitet Obywatelski). After the World War I armistice, the committee renamed itself to the People's Council and later to the Supreme People's Council. The Council self-disbanded on August 19, 1919, when power in the area was transferred to the re-united Second Polish Republic.
