= Ciświca =

- Village
- Location within Poland
- Coordinates: 51°57′N 17°30′E
- Country: Poland
- Voivodeship: Greater Poland
- County: Jarocin
- Gmina: Jarocin

Ciświca [t͡ɕiɕˈfit͡sa] is a village in the administrative district of Gmina Jarocin, within Jarocin County, Greater Poland Voivodeship, in west-central Poland.

== History ==
Following the invasion of Poland and the outbreak of the Second World War in September 1939, Ciświca was occupied by the German Wehrmacht. Administered within Reichsgau Wartheland as part of the district or county (kreis) of Jarotschin, it was renamed Schoberdorf. After the arrival of the Red Army in January 1945 and the end of the war, it became a part of the People's Republic of Poland.
