= Cielcza =

- Village
- Location within Poland
- Coordinates: 52°1′N 17°29′E
- Country: Poland
- Voivodeship: Greater Poland
- County: Jarocin
- Gmina: Jarocin
- Population: 2,044

Cielcza [ˈt͡ɕɛlt͡ʂa] is a village in the administrative district of Gmina Jarocin, within Jarocin County, Greater Poland Voivodeship, in west-central Poland.

== History ==
Following the invasion of Poland and the outbreak of the Second World War in September 1939, Cielcza was occupied by Nazi Germany and renamed Fürstenau. It was administered within Reichsgau Wartheland as part of the district or county (kreis) of Jarotschin. Following the arrival of the Red Army in January 1945 and the end of the war, it became part of the People's Republic of Poland.
