= Siedlemin =

- Village
- Location within Poland
- Coordinates: 51°56′N 17°28′E
- Country: Poland
- Voivodeship: Greater Poland
- County: Jarocin
- Gmina: Jarocin

Siedlemin [ɕɛˈdlɛmin] is a village in the administrative district of Gmina Jarocin, within Jarocin County, Greater Poland Voivodeship, in west-central Poland.
