= Roszków, Greater Poland Voivodeship =

Roszków
- Village
- Location within Poland
- Coordinates: 51°57′N 17°26′E
- Country: Poland
- Voivodeship: Greater Poland
- County: Jarocin
- Gmina: Jarocin

Roszków [ˈrɔʂkuf] is a village in the administrative district of Gmina Jarocin, within Jarocin County, Greater Poland Voivodeship, in west-central Poland.
