= Józef Rymer =

Silesian politician

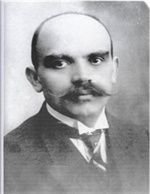
- Born: February 9, 1882; Zabelkau, Province of Silesia, German Empire
- Died: December 5, 1922 (aged 40); Katowice, Silesian Voivodeship, Second Polish Republic
- Occupation: Miner
- Organization: Supreme People's Council
- Spouse: Teresa née Kozubek
- Children: 9
- Parents: Józef (father); Joanna née Zielonka (mother)

Józef Rymer (1882–1922) was a Polish and Silesian activist and politician.

== Biography ==
Rymer was born in Zabełków on February 2, 1882. Before the First World War he was an activist in the Zjednoczenie Zawodowe Polskie (Polish Union of Unions), a Polish labor union organization in Imperial Germany (see also German partition). He was also a member of the Naczelna Rada Ludowa (pro-endecja) Polish political organization in Germany. He was the target of assaults and even an assassination attempt by nationalist German extremists (Freikorps); eventually he became one of the leaders of the Silesian Uprisings. Elected to the Polish parliament (Sejm), he also became the first voivode of the Silesian Voivodeship in June 1922. On December 5 that year, he died of a stroke and was buried at the Francuska Street Cemetery in Katowice.
