= Radlin, Greater Poland Voivodeship =

Radlin
- Village
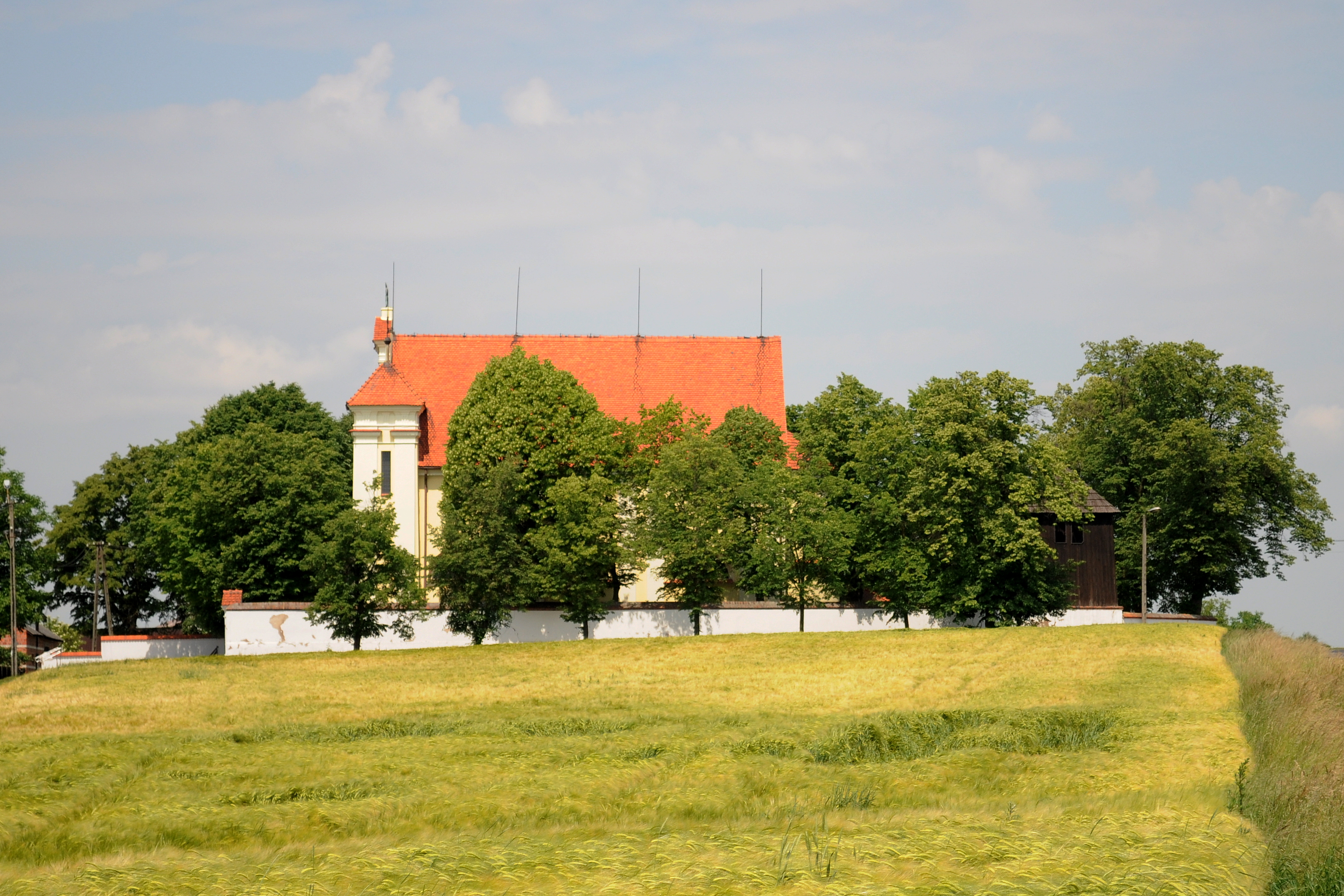
- Saint Valentine church in Radlin

- Location within Poland
- Coordinates: 52°1′59″N 17°29′54″E
- Country: Poland
- Voivodeship: Greater Poland
- County: Jarocin
- Gmina: Jarocin
- Postal code: 63-200

Radlin [ˈradlʲin] is a village in the administrative district of Gmina Jarocin, within Jarocin County, Greater Poland Voivodeship, in west-central Poland.
