= Roszkówko, Jarocin County =

Roszkówko
- Village
- Location within Poland
- Coordinates: 51°54′50″N 17°34′00″E
- Country: Poland
- Voivodeship: Greater Poland
- County: Jarocin
- Gmina: Jarocin

Roszkówko [rɔʂˈkufkɔ] is a village in the administrative district of Gmina Jarocin, within Jarocin County, Greater Poland Voivodeship, in west-central Poland.
