= Bachorzew =

- Village
- Location within Poland
- Coordinates: 52°0′N 17°34′E
- Country: Poland
- Voivodeship: Greater Poland
- County: Jarocin
- Gmina: Jarocin
- Population: 360

Bachorzew [baˈxɔʐɛf] is a village in the administrative district of Gmina Jarocin, within Jarocin County, Greater Poland Voivodeship, in west-central Poland.
