= Anhelli =

1838 poem by Juliusz Słowacki

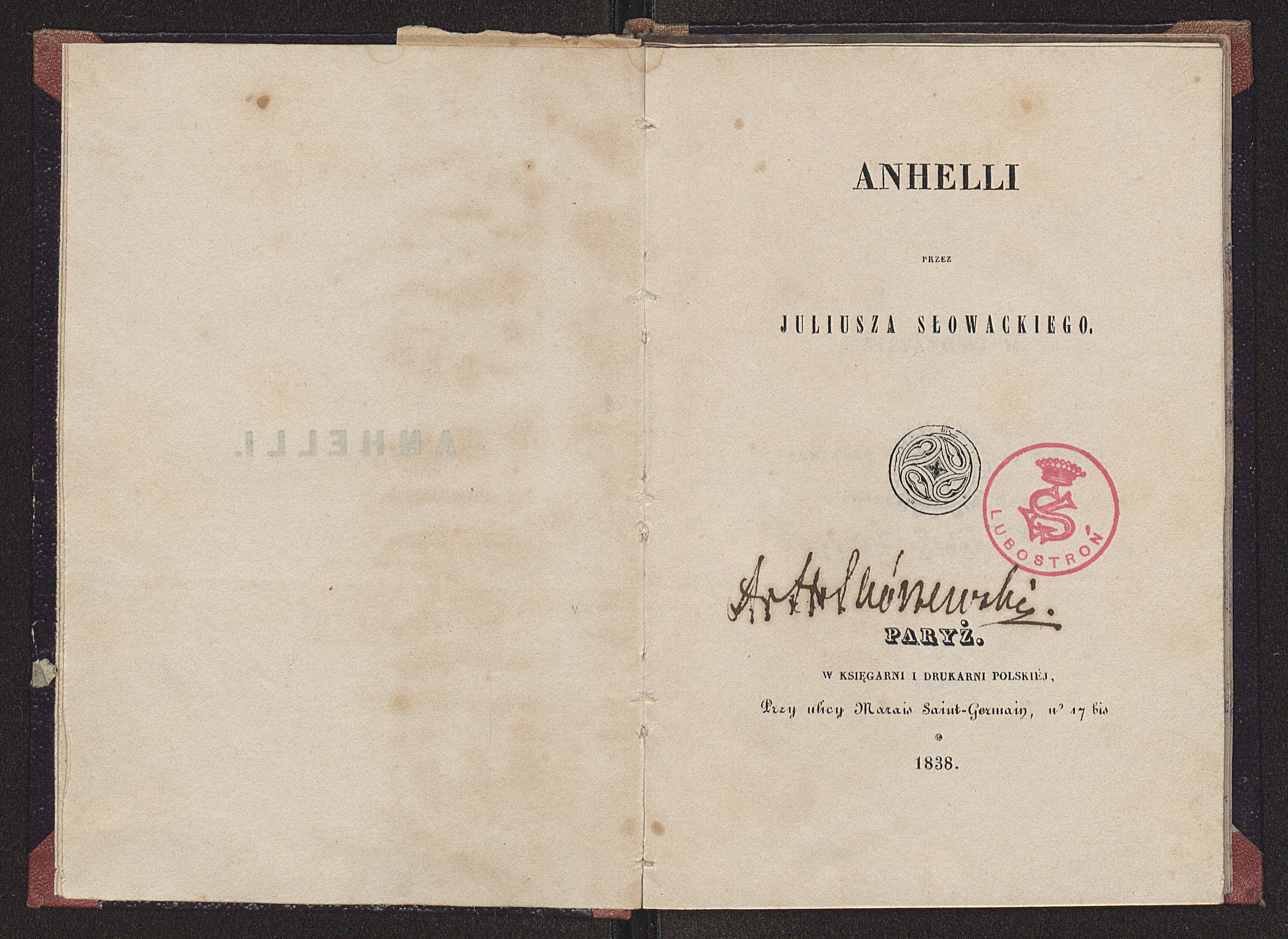
- Title page of the first edition of Anhelli, 1838
- Author: Juliusz Słowacki
- Language: Polish
- Genre: prose poetry
- Publisher: Księgarnia i Drukarnia Polska
- Publication date: 1838
- Publication place: France

Anhelli is a prose poem written by Polish Romantic-era poet and dramatist Juliusz Słowacki in 1837 and published the following year in Paris.

== History ==
The poem was written in the spring of 1837 in an Armenian monastery known as Betcheszban (Resting Place of the Dead) in Ghazir, a town in the mountains of Lebanon. Słowacki wrote that he created the poem "full of those feelings and thoughts, which were freshly inspired in me by the Holy Land and a night spent by the tomb of Jesus". The poem was edited in Florence and published in Paris in 1838 in the Polish Library and Printing Press located at Marais Saint-Germain No 17. The print on the 108 pages of the poem was produced by Bourgogne et Martinet printing house. Słowacki dedicated his work to Stefan Hołyński.

The poem conveys a pessimistic vision of the future of Polish emigration and the fight for the country's independence. It directly alludes to Adam Mickiewicz's Books of the Polish Nation and Polish Pilgrimage by employing stylized biblical prose. It portrays antagonized Polish exiles who are destined for destruction in the realities of Siberia, a place strongly associated with the martyrology of the Polish nation. It sends a messianistic message and poses the question whether the whole nation can ever be saved by an individual or an entire generation of emigrants.

Anhelli served as inspiration for the symphonic poem of the same name by Ludomir Różycki composed in 1909. The poem is also the basis of Anhelli. The Calling, the last part of a theatrical triptych Gospels of Childhood produced by Wrocław-based ZAR Theatre.

== Plot ==
The main plot of the work revolves around the journey through Siberia undertaken by the titular character, a youth named Anhelli, and his guide Shaman, leader of a Siberian tribe. Anhelli was chosen by Shaman from Polish exiles as the redeemer because of his "purity and sinlessness" and he was to be subjected to an initiation by taking part in a journey to see the suffering of the nation. Siberia is portrayed in Słowacki's poem as "white hell" for Polish exiles, a place of execution and spiritual downfall. The main characters wander through various places from deserts and abandoned graveyards through forests to the dark mines of Siberia. Their journey is reminiscent of Dante's journey through hell where the main protagonist, accompanied by Virgil, crosses the circles of hell meeting the damned along the way. Polish exiles are depicted as travelling across a deserted, hostile and hellish country, working hard in mines, suffering in cold dungeons with shackles on their legs and enduring beatings and humiliation. Their children are starving and are subjected to forced Russification.

Anhelli and Shaman's journey starts from the House of Exiles and was supposed to end there as well. However, Shaman's death resulting from a fight among the exiles forces Anhelli to embark on another journey to a faraway desert in the north where he dwells in a hut carved out from ice. Upon the death of Ellenai, a penitent and Anhelli's exiled companion, he is visited by two angels heralding the end of the world as well as his own death. Soon after, he also passes away and is not awakened by the call of the armoured Knight to resurrect and take revenge on the oppressors.

== Gallery ==
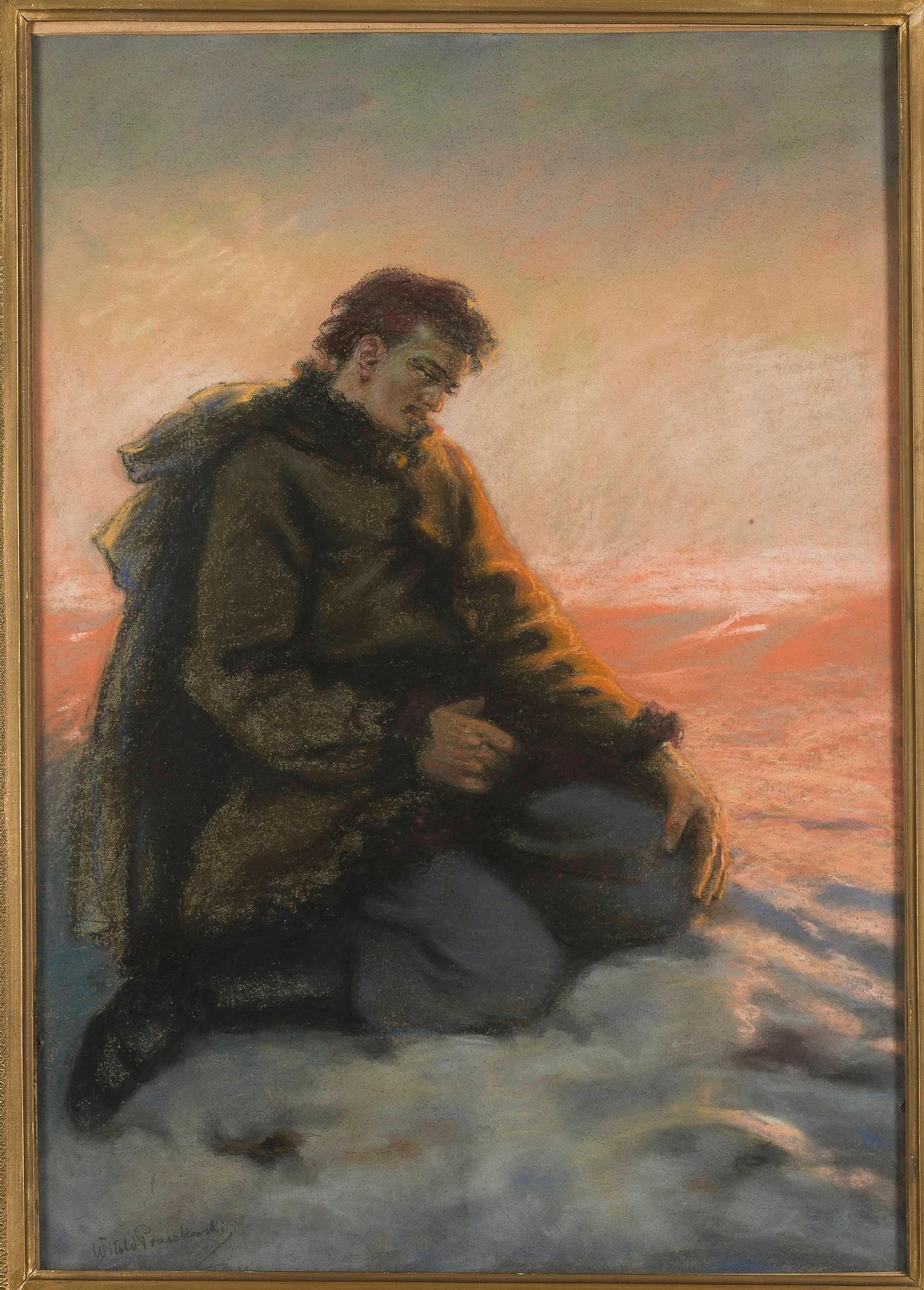
Anhelli (Before His Death) by Witold Pruszkowski, 1889

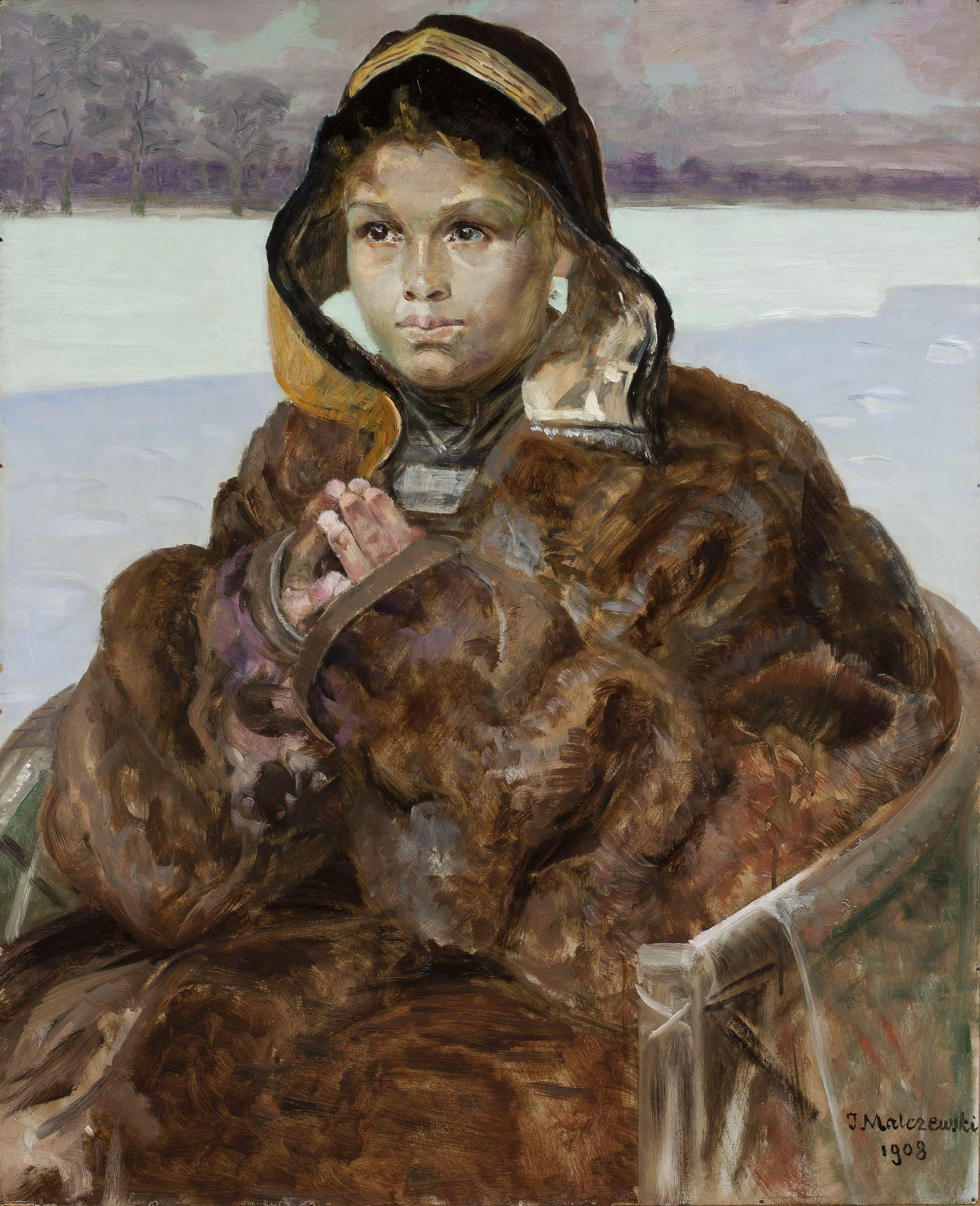
Ellenai by Jacek Malczewski, 1908

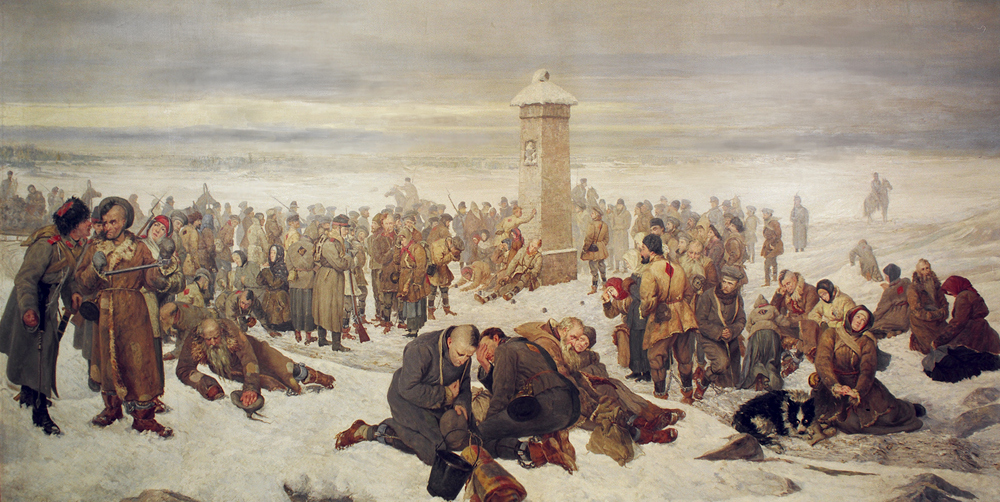
Farewell to Europe, by Aleksander Sochaczewski depicting Sybiraks, 1894

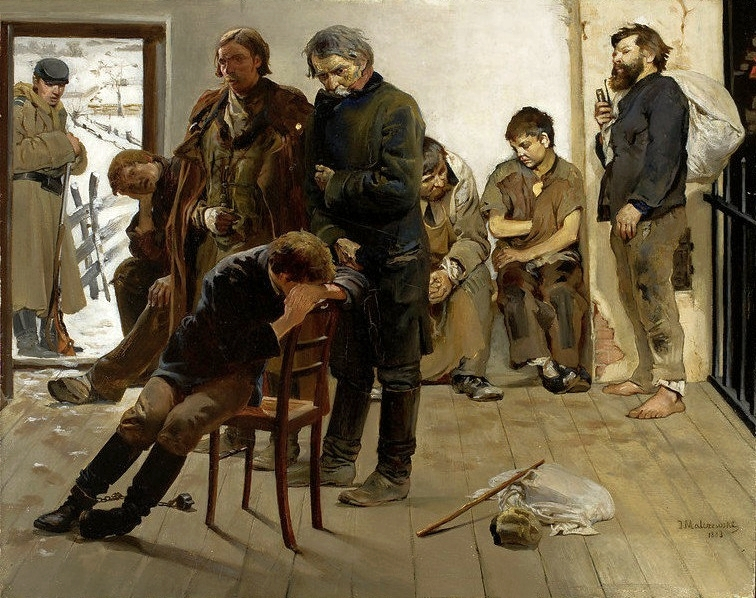
The Prisoners, Jacek Malczewski, 1883

== See also ==
- Polish poets
- Three Bards
- Kordian
