= Witold Pruszkowski =

Polish painter and graphic artist

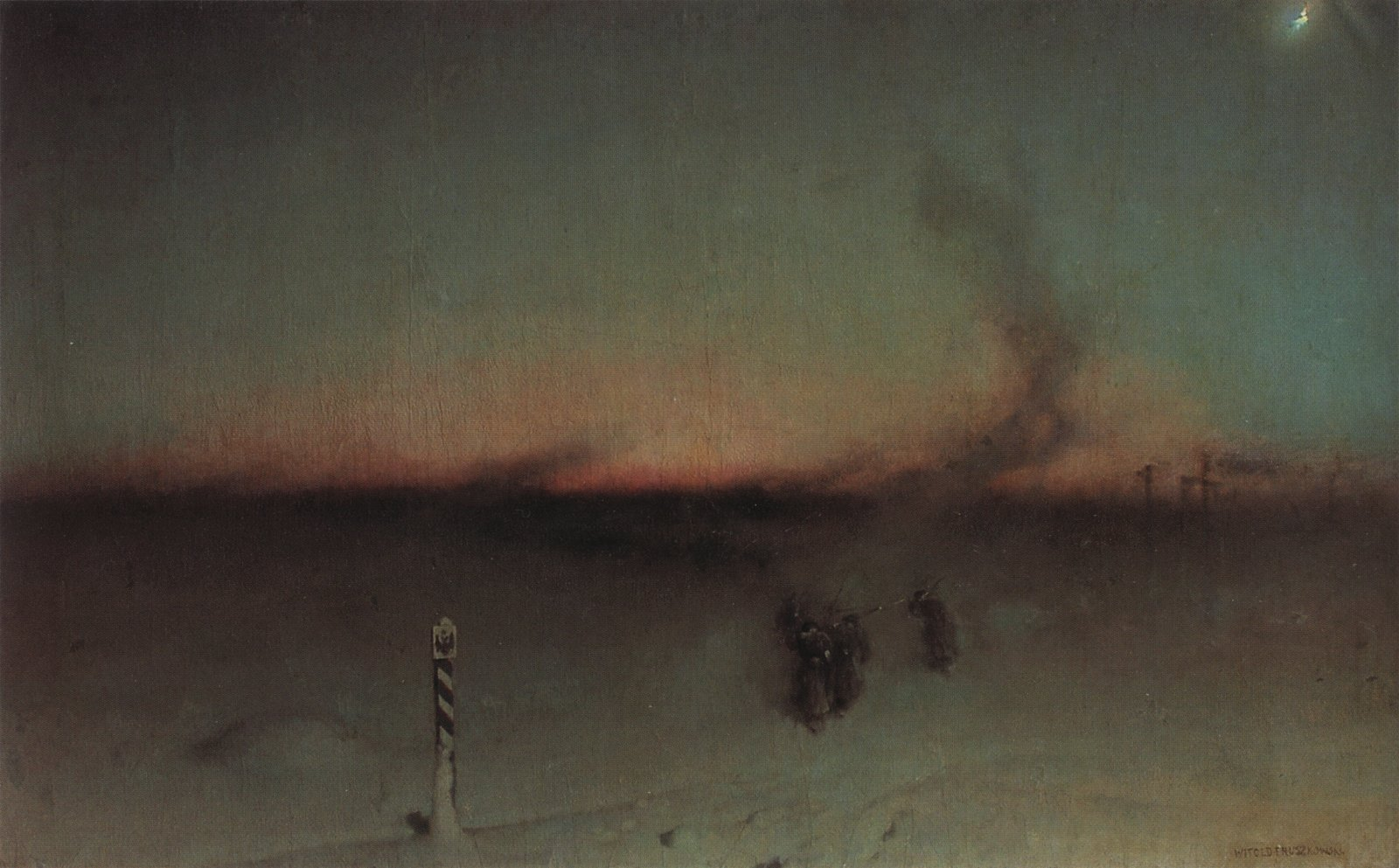
March to Siberia, 1893, Lviv National Art Gallery

Witold Pruszkowski (Polish pronunciation: ['vi:tɔld ˌpruʂ'kɔvski]) (14 January 1846, Bershad – 10 October 1896, Budapest) was a Polish painter and graphic artist in the Symbolist style.

== Biography ==
Witold Pruszkowski was born on 14 January 1846 in Bershad in modern day Ukraine. He spent his childhood in Odesa and Kyiv (also in modern Ukraine). The family emigrated to Dieppe in 1860, and he relocated to Paris in 1866, where he had his first drawing lessons with the portrait painter, Tadeusz Gorecki, the son-in-law of Adam Mickiewicz. From 1869 to 1872, he studied at the Academy of Fine Arts, Munich with Alexander von Wagner then, from 1872 to 1875, at the Kraków Academy of Fine Arts with Jan Matejko. His unique color palette and soft focus led critics to label him as Poland's first impressionist.

In 1882, he settled in Mników. Over the next few years, he and his brother travelled to Algeria, Tunisia and Italy. He also held several exhibitions in Warsaw and Lviv. Later, he exhibited internationally, including shows in San Francisco and Chicago. In 1892, he became a member of the construction committee for a monument to Artur Grottger, whose works inspired a trio of Pruszkowski's most famous paintings: Lithuania, Poland, and War. These established his style as an artist who drew subjects from national literature, but commented on the scenes rather than simply illustrating them. In the early 1890s, Pruszkowski was inspired by the prose poem Anhelli by Juliusz Słowacki (1837) to create multiple pastels and oil paintings illustrating the plight of the Polish exiles in Siberia. Though each scene represents an event in the epic, critics see a commentary on the connection between this world and another. For example, in Eloe among the Graves, the angel does not command the unquiet dead to cease their groaning with a thunderclap of his wings as in the epic, but instead is an ethereal feminine figure that gently spreads its arms in a soothing gesture.

Although he painted portraits and rural scenes, he is best known for his depictions of fairy tales and folklore; working in pastels as well as oils. He also drew inspiration from the works of Juliusz Słowacki and Zygmunt Krasiński. His most familiar work is, perhaps, "March to Siberia", painted in 1893. Its whereabouts were unknown for many years, but it was found in a private collection after World War II and is now in the Lviv National Art Gallery.

He was ill for several years before his death in 1896. While visiting with family in Kołomyja, he suddenly disappeared. He was found at the train station in Budapest, suffering from extreme exhaustion, and was taken to a hospital, where he died two days later.

== Selected paintings ==
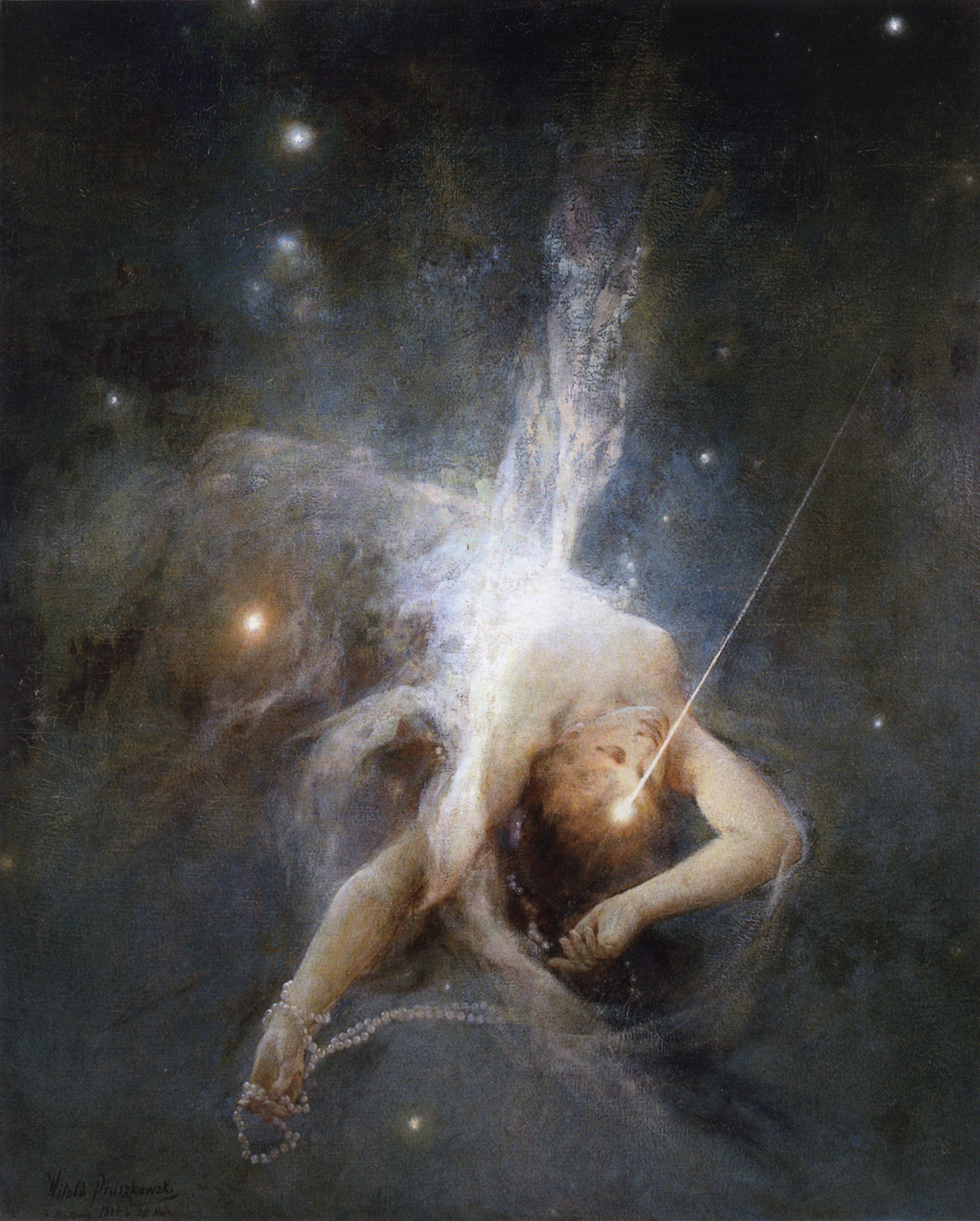
Falling Star, 1884, National Museum, Warsaw

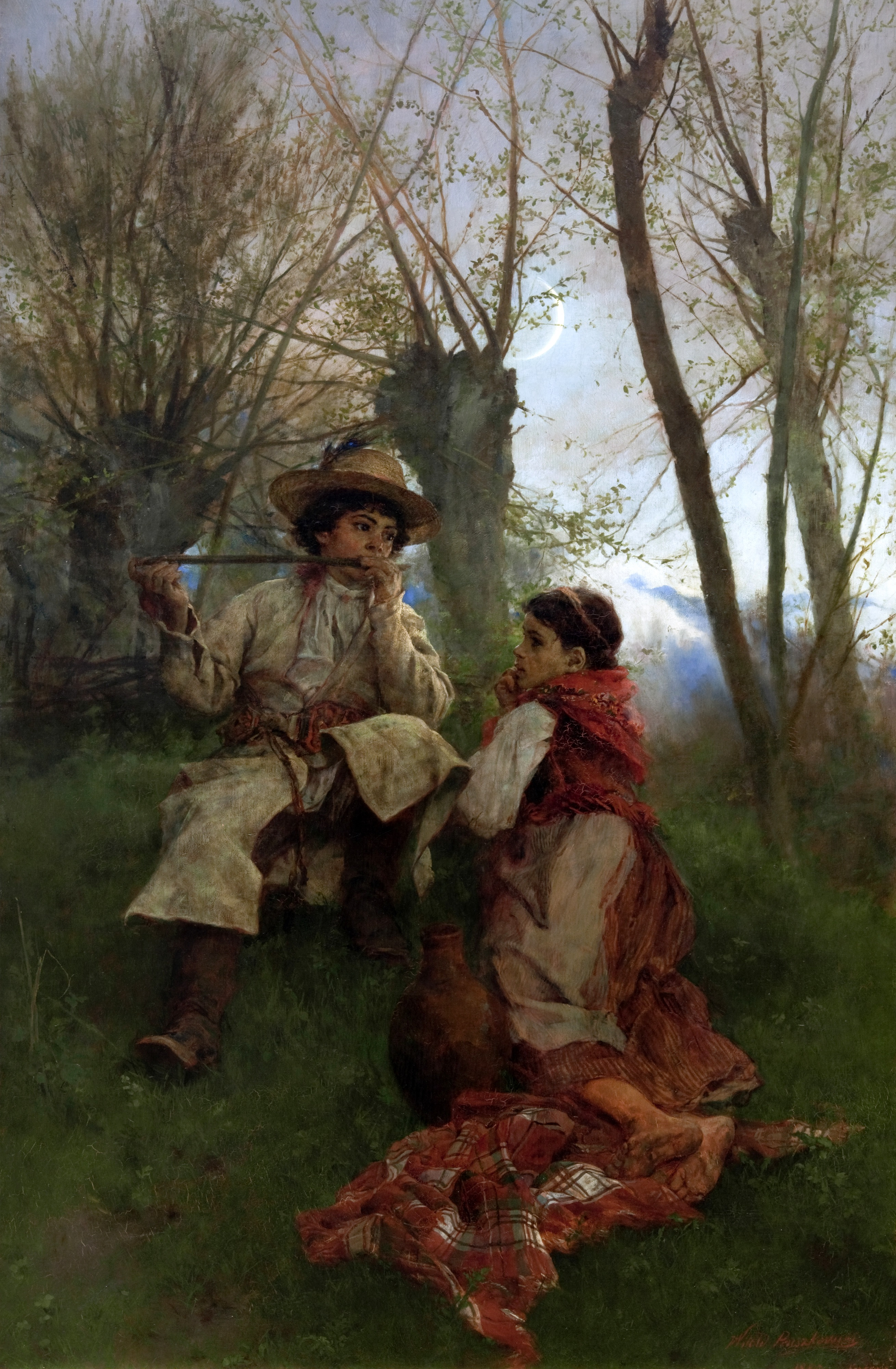
Idyll, 1880, National Museum, Kraków

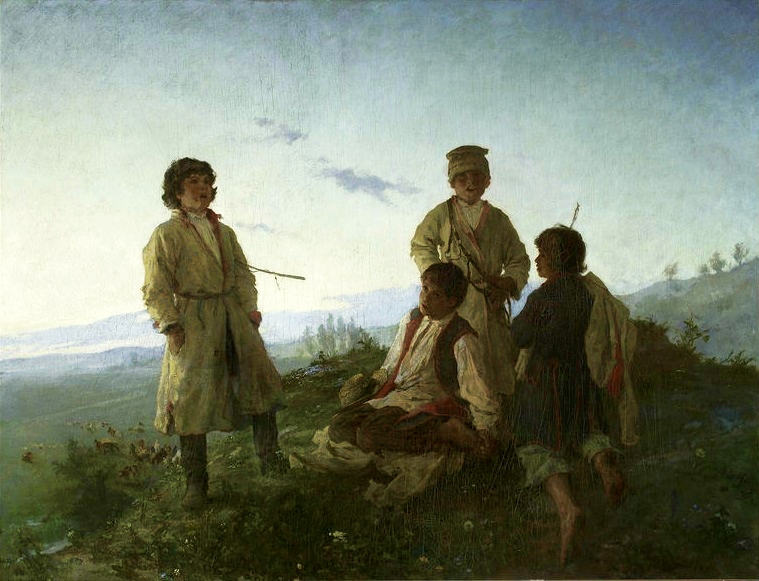
When Dawn is Breaking, 1876, National Museum, Warsaw

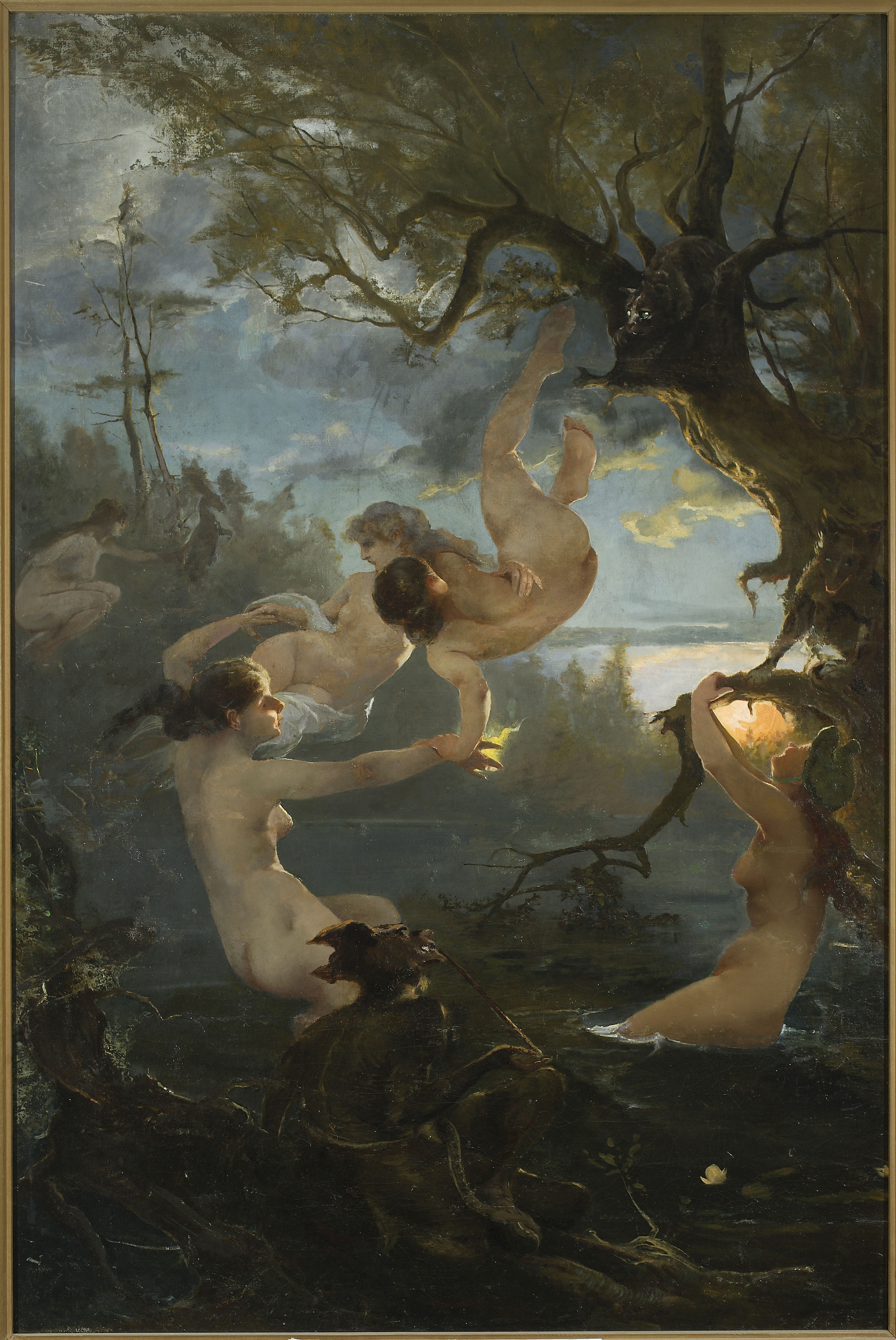
Water nymphs, National Museum, Warsaw

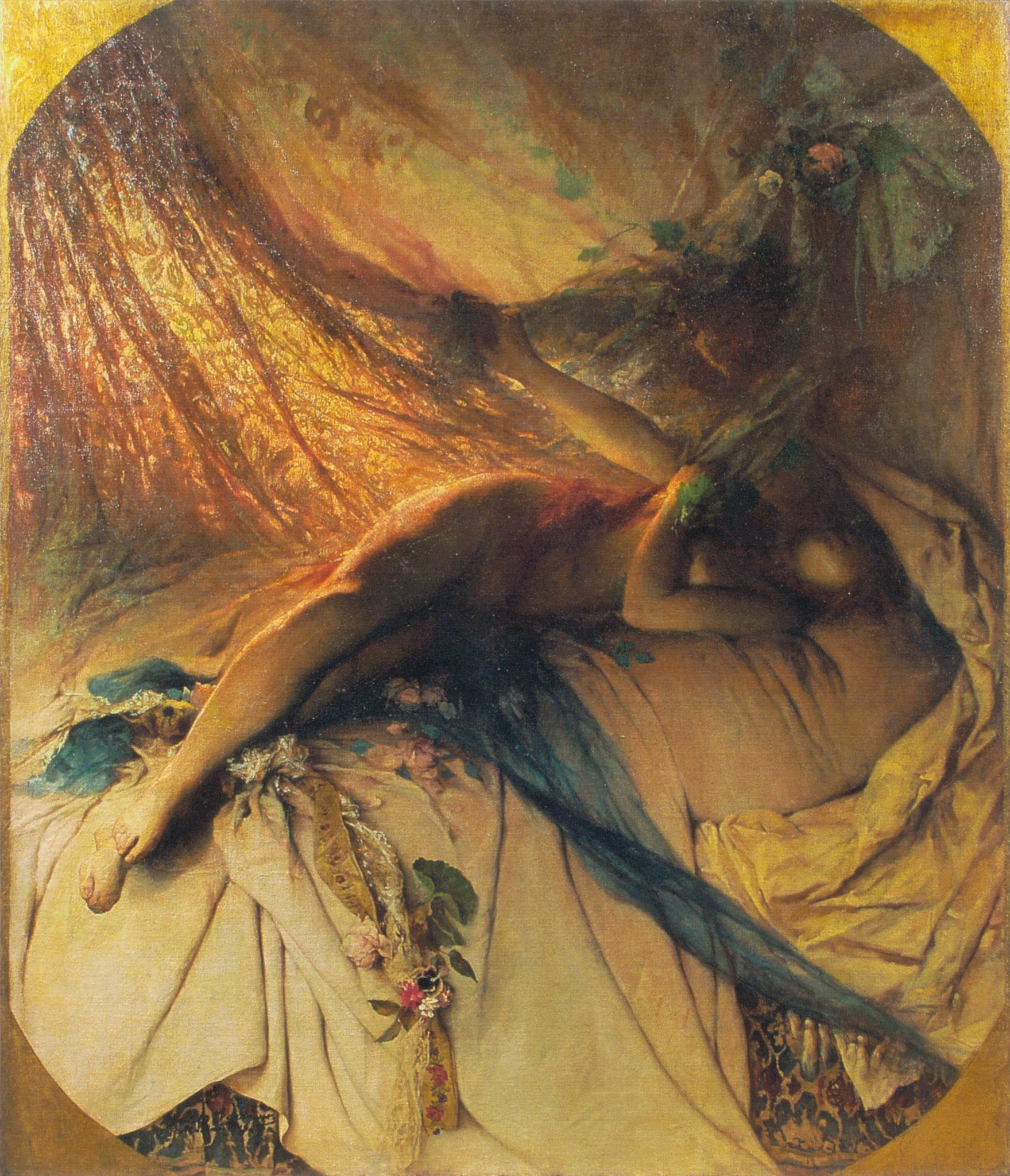
Maenad, 1885, Lviv National Art Gallery

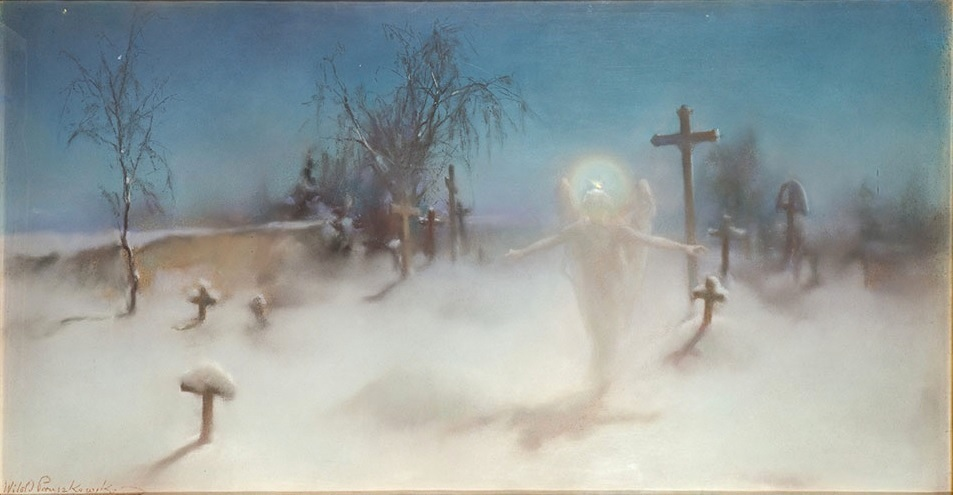
Eloe Among the Graves [from Anhelli, Ch. 11], 1892, National Museum, Wrocław
