= Pośród niesnasków Pan Bóg uderza... =

Pośród niesnasków Pan Bóg uderza... - "Among the discord God rings [a bell]..." - is a poem written by Juliusz Słowacki in 1848, in which the poet prophesied the coming of a first Slavic pope.

The poem was not popular with Słowacki's contemporaries and was mostly forgotten until a century later, when it gained huge popularity after Polish cardinal Karol Wojtyła was elected pope in 1978, as it has explicit predictions regarding a future Slavic pope (in Polish: "Słowiański Papież"). It was frequently cited by John Paul II.
