= Testament mój =

Poem by Polish poet Juliusz Słowacki

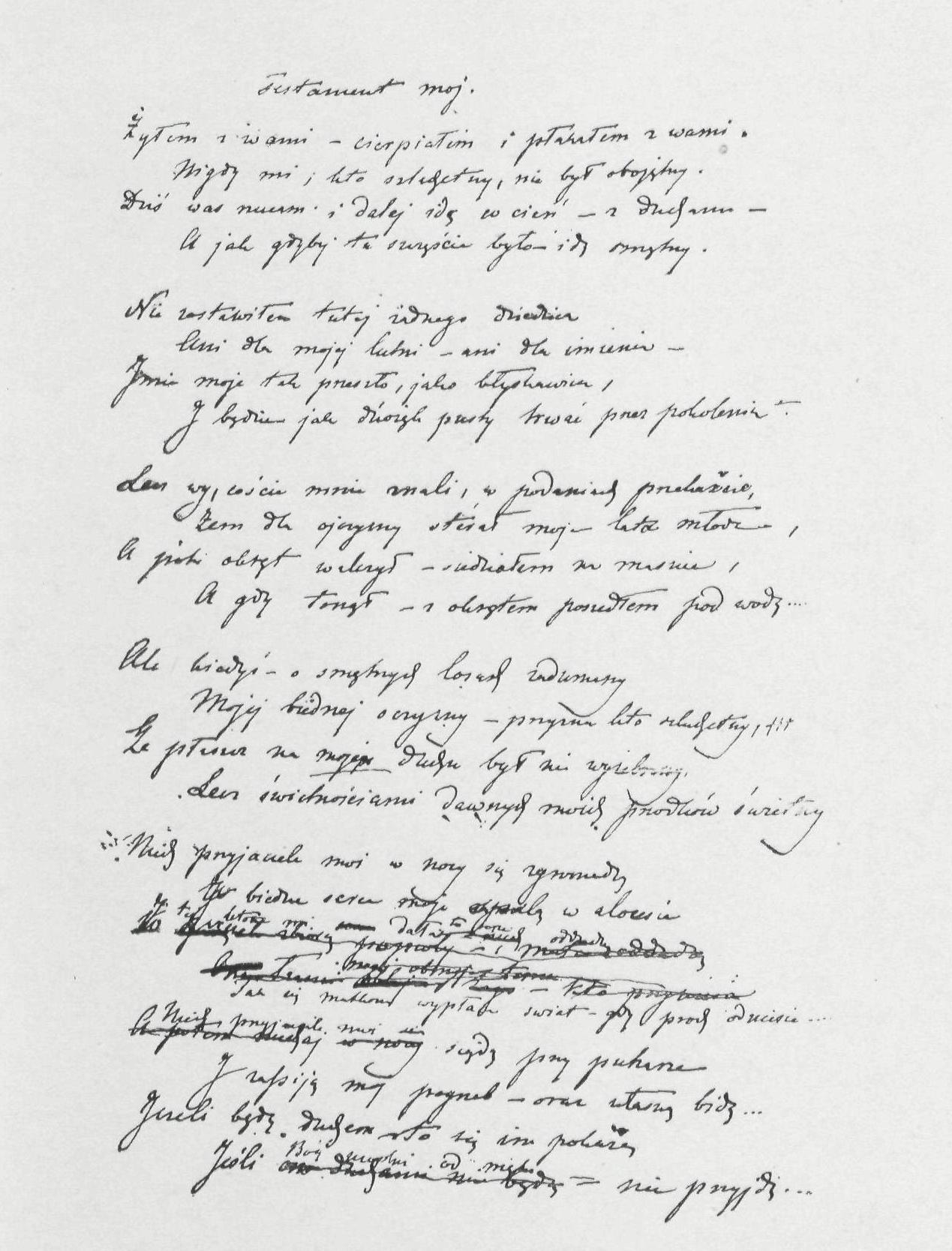
The poem

Testament mój (variously translated as My Testament, My Last Will, The Testament of Mine, My Will and Testament and likewise) is a poem written by Juliusz Słowacki, one of the Three Bards of Polish poetry, in Paris around 1839 and 1840. This poem has been described as one of Słowacki's most famous works.

== History ==
The exact date Słowacki's created this poem is not known. The work was written around 1839-1840 in Paris. Kamela dates the work to "likely the end of 1839". At this time Słowacki was a target of a number of Polish literary critics, hostile to his works and ideology, and this poem was one of his replies to them.

== Meaning and significance ==
This poem is an example of the poetical testament (testament poetycki) genre. In this type of work, somewhat similar to a brief autobiography in verse, and inspired by "Non omnis moriar" (Latin for "Not all of me will die") of Horace, the poet usually conveys his or her ideologies and beliefs, as well as wishes and hopes.

Testament... describes Słowacki's faith that despite the grim reality of the present his works will endure and gain renown after his death. Słowacki expresses his sadness at being alone and not understood, as well as pride from his achievements. He also conveys his beliefs that the mission of a poet must be continued, no matter the costs and sacrifices. The poem is also characteristic of the Polish romanticism for idealizing self-sacrifice.

This poem served as an inspiration for the title of the 1943 book Kamienie na szaniec (lit. Stones for the Rampart) by Aleksander Kamiński, where it is used as a reference to the sacrificial and insurrectionist traditions of Polish romanticism. It was also an inspiration for the 1942 poem Non omnis moriar by a Polish Jewish poet, Zuzanna Ginczanka.

The poem, in a sung version, is also a hymn of several high schools of whose Słowacki is a patron of.
