= Beniowski =

Beniowski is a poem written and composed by one of Poland's "Three National Bards", Juliusz Słowacki. The first section was published in 1841, however the remaining parts were written by Antoni Malecki after Słowacki's death in 1849.

The content of the poem summarizes the events that occurred during the infamous Bar Confederation; the fight against the Russians and rebellious Ruthenian peasants, which took place in the Eastern borderlands (Polish: Kresy) of the Polish-Lithuanian Commonwealth. It tells the story of Maurycy Beniowski, an impoverished nobleman and aristocrat in the region of Podolia, and his love to a wealthy lady living in a nearby castle with her intolerant family.

The poem is often described as digressive. It is a composition that marks a temporary shift of a subject; the digression ends when the plot returns to the main topic. Furthermore, Słowacki has intentionally used digression to create a somewhat rhetorical meaning to the text.
