= Poetical testament =

Poem genre

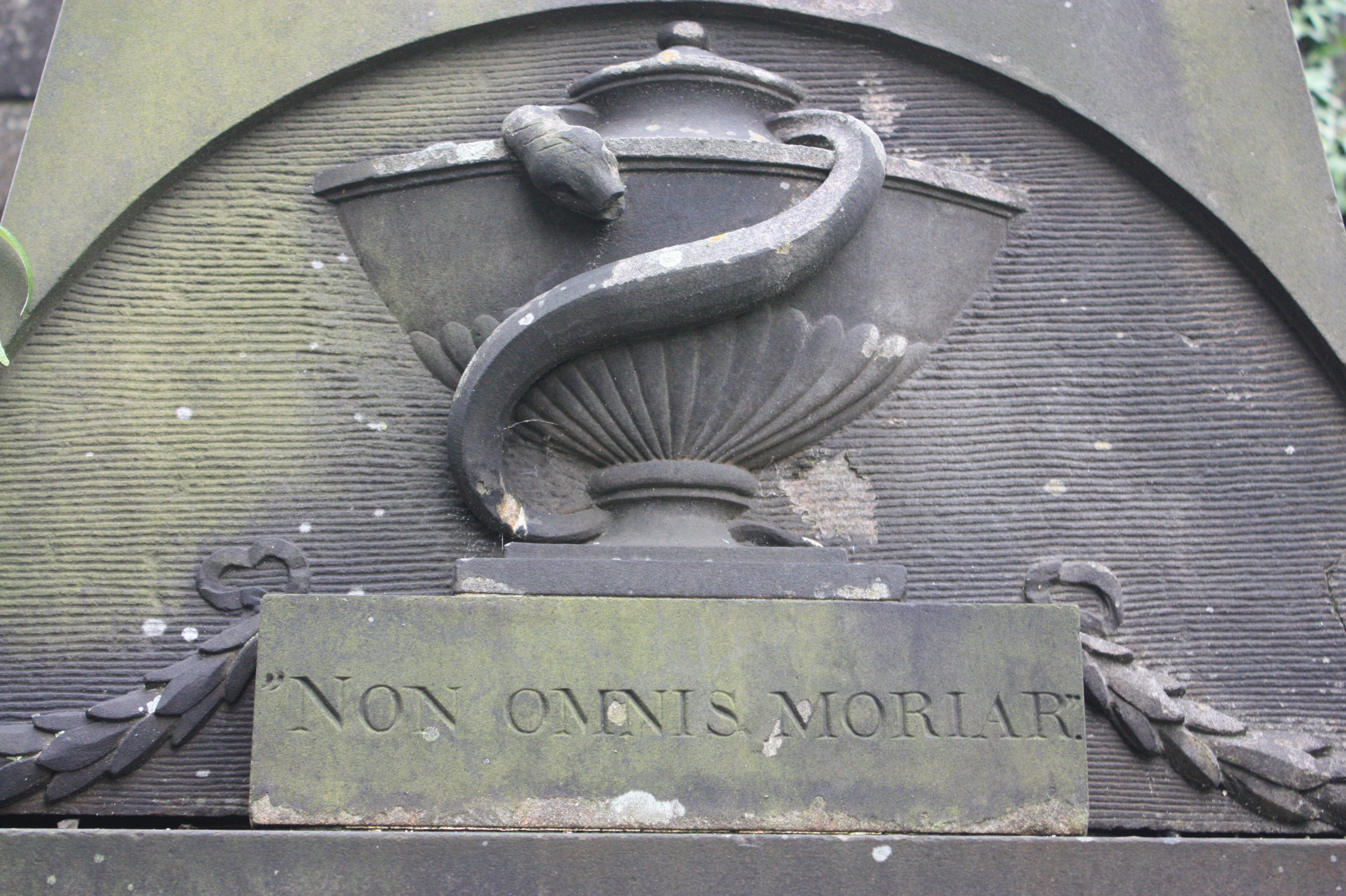
Non Omnis Moriar, Greyfriars Kirkyard, Edinburgh

Poetical testament is a poem genre, somewhat similar to a brief autobiography or last will in verse, in which the poet usually conveys his or her ideologies and beliefs, as well as wishes and hopes.

The oldest poetical testament was "Non omnis moriar" (Latin for "Not all of me will die") of Horace.

Examples:

- Le Testament
- Testament mój

== See also ==
- Chaucer's Retraction
- Devotions upon Emergent Occasions
