= Władysław Oleszczyński =

Polish sculptor (1807–1866)

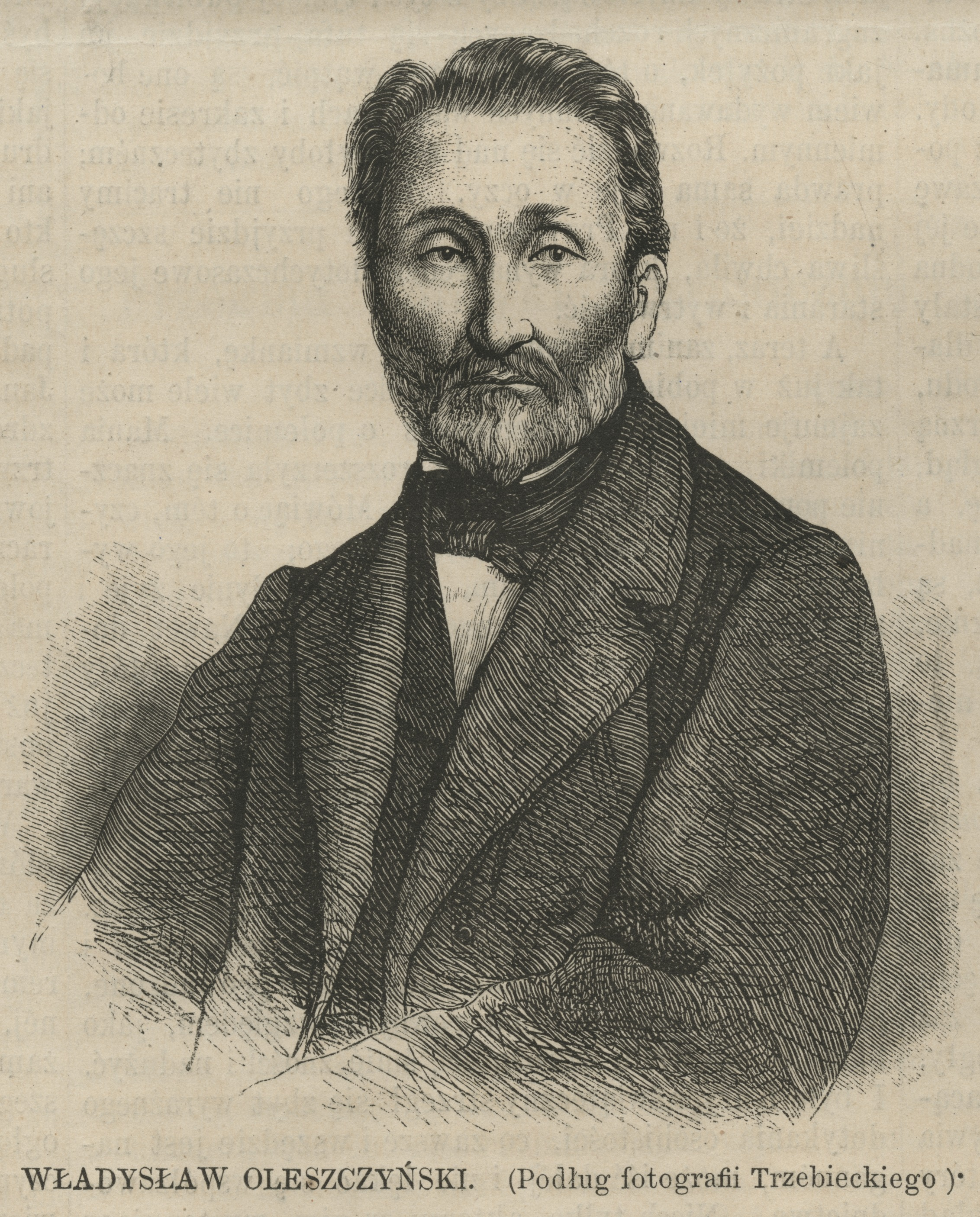
Władysław Oleszczyński

Władysław Oleszczyński (17 December 1807 in Końskowola – 11 April 1866 in Rome) was a Polish sculptor who created a monument of Adam Mickiewicz in Poznań and the tombstone of Juliusz Słowacki at the Montmartre Cemetery in Paris.
