= Charles Pétiniaud-Dubos =

French painter

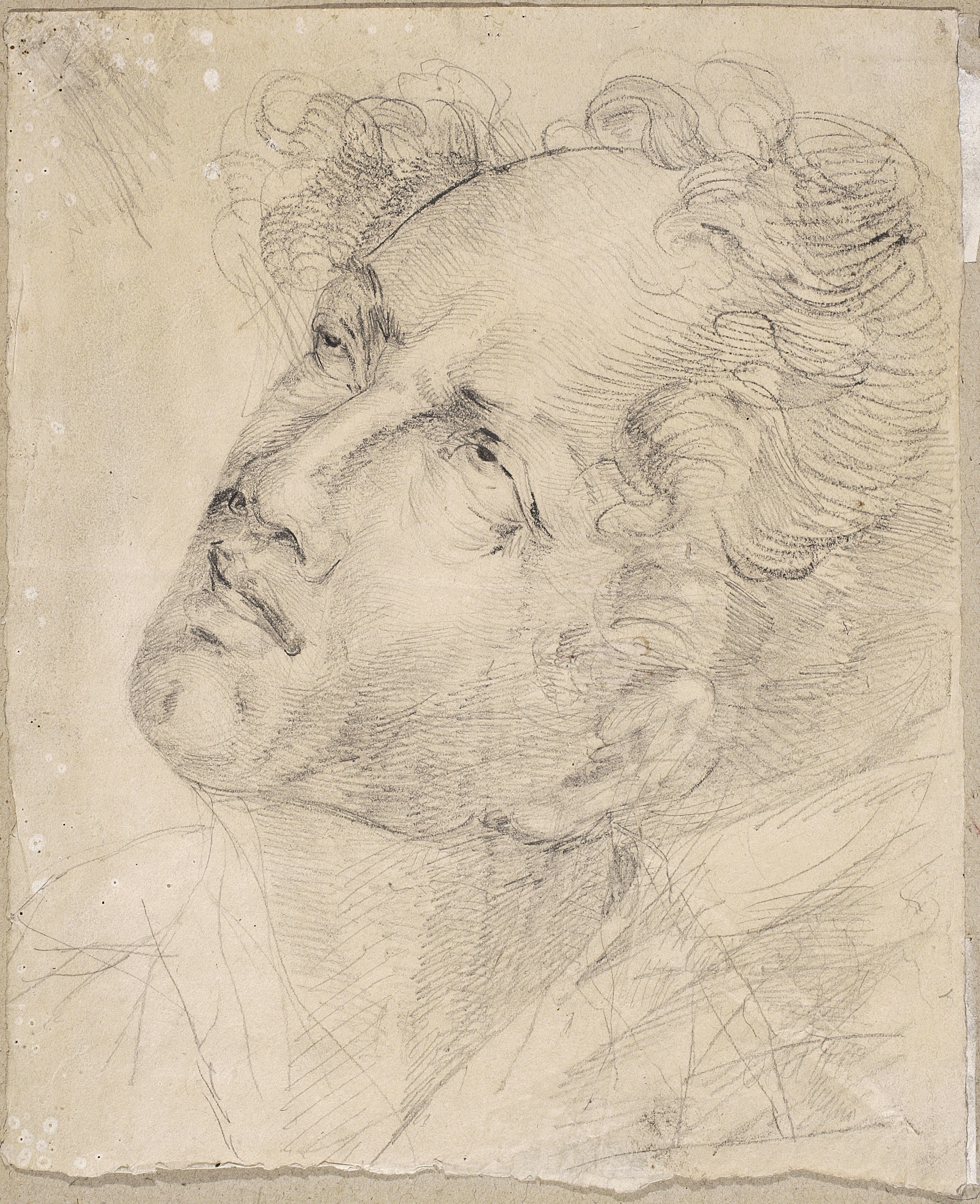
Juliusz Słowacki on deathbed. Sketch done by his friend, Charles Pétiniaud-Dubos (1849)

Charles Pétiniaud-Dubos (1822 or 1823 – 15 March 1906) was a French painter.

He created the interior decorations of the Saint-Étienne Limoges Cathedral in 1844. His work was displayed at Paris exhibitions in 1844, 1848, 1856, 1897 and 1906. He was also associated with Salon des Independants and Société des Artistes Indépendants. He took place in 21st Salon des Independants in 1905, showing off the works: Paysage, Asile de nuit, Vieux souvenirs, Paysage, Barderage, A Lesbos, Le Barbichet, and Coiffure limousine a la fete de l'egantine a Uzerche. In catalog he is credited as living in 67, rue Rochechouart in Paris and 60, rue du Chinchauvaud in Limoges.

He was a friend and executor of the last will of Polish poet Juliusz Słowacki, for whom he designed his first tombstone. He also drew a sketch of Słowacki at his deathbed in 1849.

In 1906 Władysław Alojzy Strzembosz, looking for Słowacki's remnants, found that Petiniaud displayled 7 paintings at exhibition of Société des Artistes Indépendants. He came too late to visit the painter, who already died 15 March and had his estate sold and money committed to the hospice in the hometown of Limoges.
