= National Bards crypt of the Wawel =

Crypt in the basements of the Wawel Cathedral on Wawel Hill

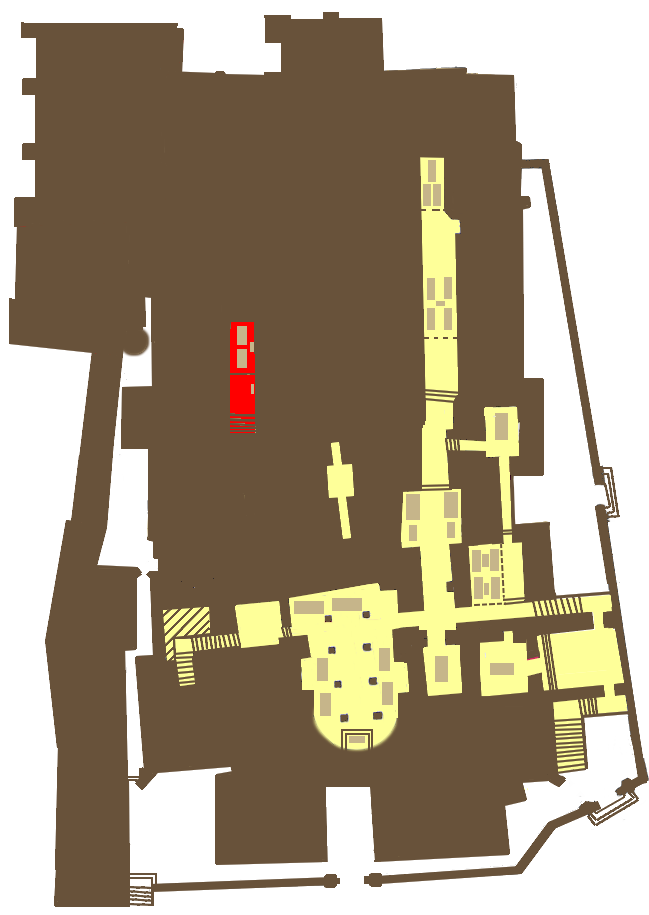
National Bards crypt (highlighted in red) on the plan of the cathedral's underground

National Bards crypt is a crypt located in the basements of the Wawel Cathedral on Wawel Hill. It serves as the burial place for Adam Mickiewicz and Juliusz Słowacki, two prominent poets of the Romantic era whose works have become an essential part of Polish culture. Both were recognized as spiritual leaders of the nation during its period of captivity, worthy of resting in the necropolis of former Polish rulers. The crypt also commemorates two other notable Poles, esteemed artists of the 19th century – the poet Cyprian Norwid and the composer and pianist Frédéric Chopin.

== Location ==
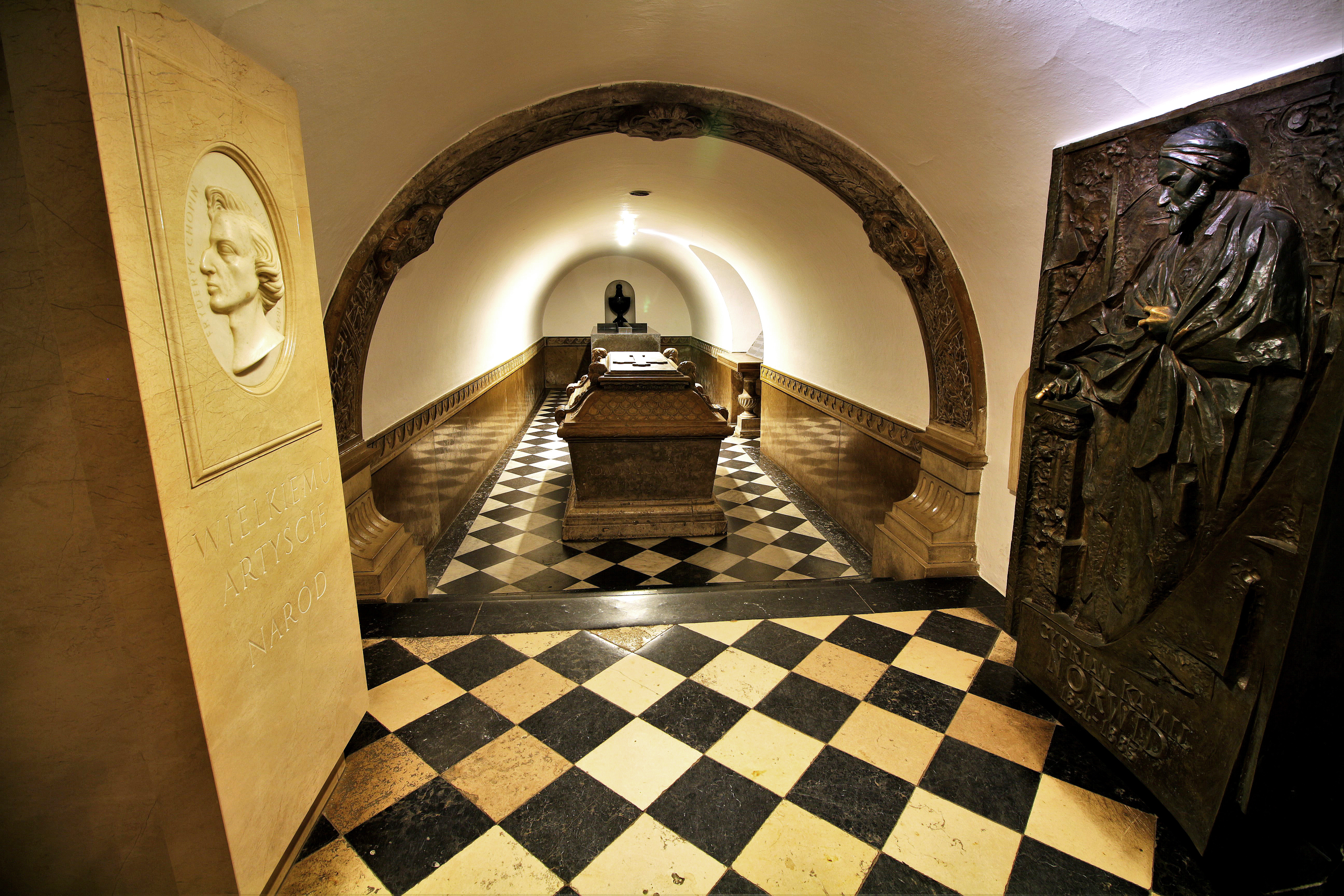
Interior of the crypt (2016)

The crypt is situated beneath the northern arm of the cathedral's ambulatory, (Note: Rożek (1995, p. 108) describes this part of the temple as the northern nave.) in front of the entrance to the Lipski Chapel.

== History ==
=== Circumstances of creation and significance ===
The crypt was established in 1890 according to the design of Sławomir Odrzywolski, as part of the preparations to place the remains of Adam Mickiewicz in the Wawel Cathedral. The idea of burying the poet in this temple emerged shortly after his death in 1855, and it was revisited at the beginning of the autonomous period during the Austrian Partition (1869) when a special committee was formed. However, this intention could not be realized at that time, and efforts were renewed in 1879, ultimately culminating in success only 11 years later.

The concept of burying the most distinguished Poles in the Wawel Cathedral to emphasize the historical continuity of the nation emerged after the Congress of Vienna when Prince Józef Poniatowski and Tadeusz Kościuszko were laid to rest there. The inspiration to honor Mickiewicz in the same way may have come from Westminster Abbey in London, where poets were buried alongside monarchs. Poles, at that time deprived of their own statehood, kings, and leaders, paid homage to the creator of Dziady by burying him in this place as a spiritual leader of the nation. In his poetry, Mickiewicz prophesied the regaining of independence.

The relocation of Mickiewicz's remains, and later those of Juliusz Słowacki, transformed the cathedral into a national pantheon, designated not only for monarchs and heroes of the struggle for independence but also for the "kings of spirit" – the most distinguished poets of the Romantic era, who died in exile and whose works contributed to the preservation of Polish national identity during the partitions. Their funerals also became significant patriotic manifestations.

Odrzywolski was tasked with creating a burial site for Mickiewicz in January 1890, and he adapted one of the existing crypts of the temple for this purpose, specifically a part of the underground beneath the northern arm of the ambulatory. It was separated from the others and covered with a barrel vault, on the arch of which shields with the coats of arms of Poland, Lithuania, and Ruthenia were carved. An altar mensa was embedded in the eastern wall of the crypt, above which was a mosaic depicting the image of Our Lady of the Gate of Dawn, funded by Konstanty Przezdziecki (made in the workshop of Antonio Salviati in Venice in the late 19th century). All work was carried out by the stone masonry workshop of the Trembecki brothers, and the materials used were intended to be of domestic origin. The necessity of preparing a separate burial place for Mickiewicz arose from the fact that the cathedral chapter, expressing its consent for his burial in June 1884, stipulated that he would not rest in the royal crypts, which were considered permanently closed.

=== Burials of Mickiewicz and Słowacki ===
On 20 June 1890, a special delegation set out to retrieve the remains of Adam Mickiewicz, which had been interred in Cimetière des Champeaux de Montmorency. The solemn burial of the poet at the Kraków Cathedral took place on July 4 of the same year. After the ceremony, the coffin was taken down to the prepared crypt, where it was placed in a sarcophagus designed by Odrzywolski, made from Częstochowa marble, (Note: Świątecka (1956, p. 51) states that the sarcophagus was made of limestone.) and adorned with a medallion featuring the likeness of the bard, created by Stanisław Roman Lewandowski. The lid was carved with angel heads based on a model by Michał Korpal. Above it hung a lamp topped with a shade shaped like an eagle.

In 1927, after many efforts and complications, the ashes of Juliusz Słowacki were successfully transported from Montmartre in Paris to Kraków. After obtaining permission from Adam Stefan Sapieha, the Metropolitan of Kraków, for the burial in the cathedral and conducting a site inspection, an empty crypt adjacent to the one containing Mickiewicz's remains was chosen as the poet's final resting place. A partition wall was demolished between the two, creating a single room. The works were directed by Adolf Szyszko-Bohusz, who also oversaw the installation of a stone frieze made of light Kielce marble along the walls of the expanded crypt at a height of about one meter, while the floor was laid with square tiles of black Belgian marble and white Carrara marble. Additionally, the altar and mosaic were relocated to the southern wall of the crypt, where a niche was carved for them.

The solemn burial took place on June 28 of that year. (Note: Rokosz (2006, p. 362) states that the funeral ceremonies took place on June 28 and 29, while the actual burial occurred on June 30.) The coffin containing the poet's remains was placed in a modernist sarcophagus made of black Krzesławice marble, designed by Szyszko-Bohusz, and set on two steps. A simple cross was carved on top, while the shorter sides were adorned with wreaths made of cut silver sheet, crafted by engraver Henryk Waldyn. Above it, in a niche in the wall at the end of the crypt, an urn containing soil from the grave of Salomea Słowacka, Słowacki's mother, from the Tunick Cemetery in Kremenets, was placed. Additionally, an alabaster lamp hung from silver chains on the ceiling. The sarcophagus was made by the Trembecki Brothers.

Sarcophagi of Mickiewicz and Słowacki

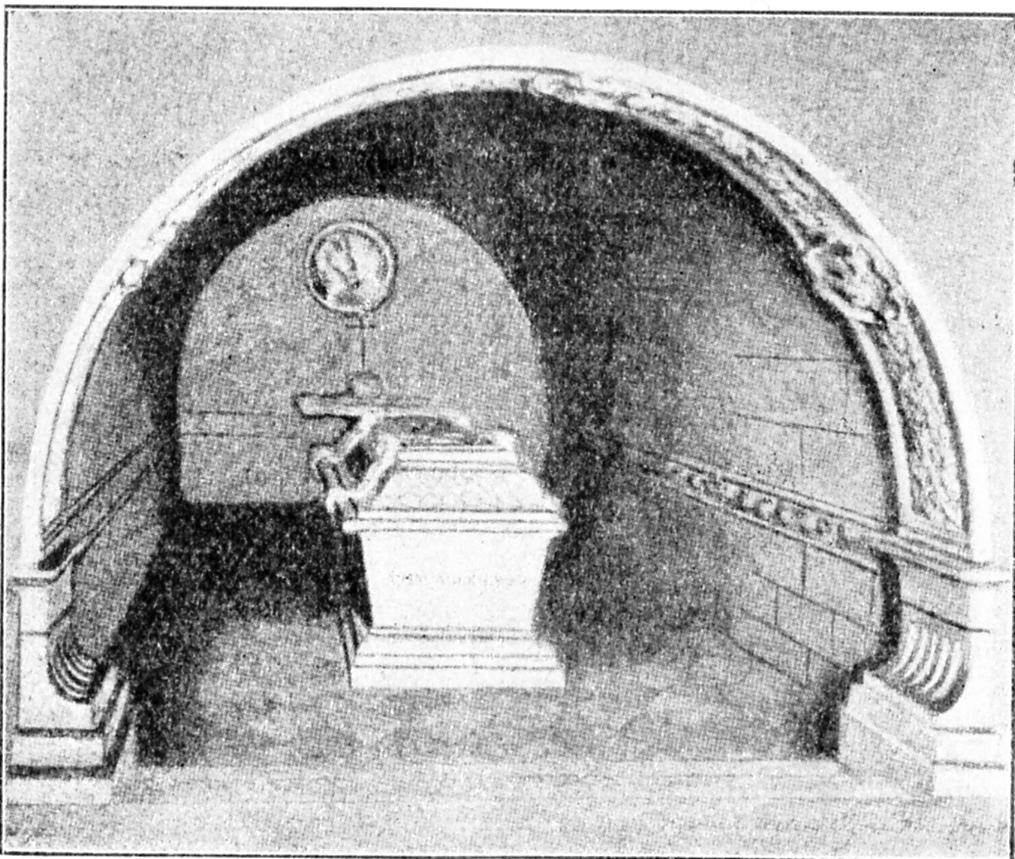
Crypt with Mickiewicz's sarcophagus

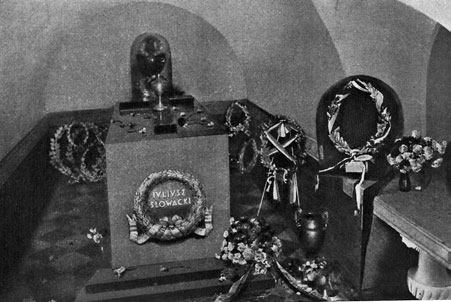
Crypt with Słowacki's sarcophagus after the funeral ceremony

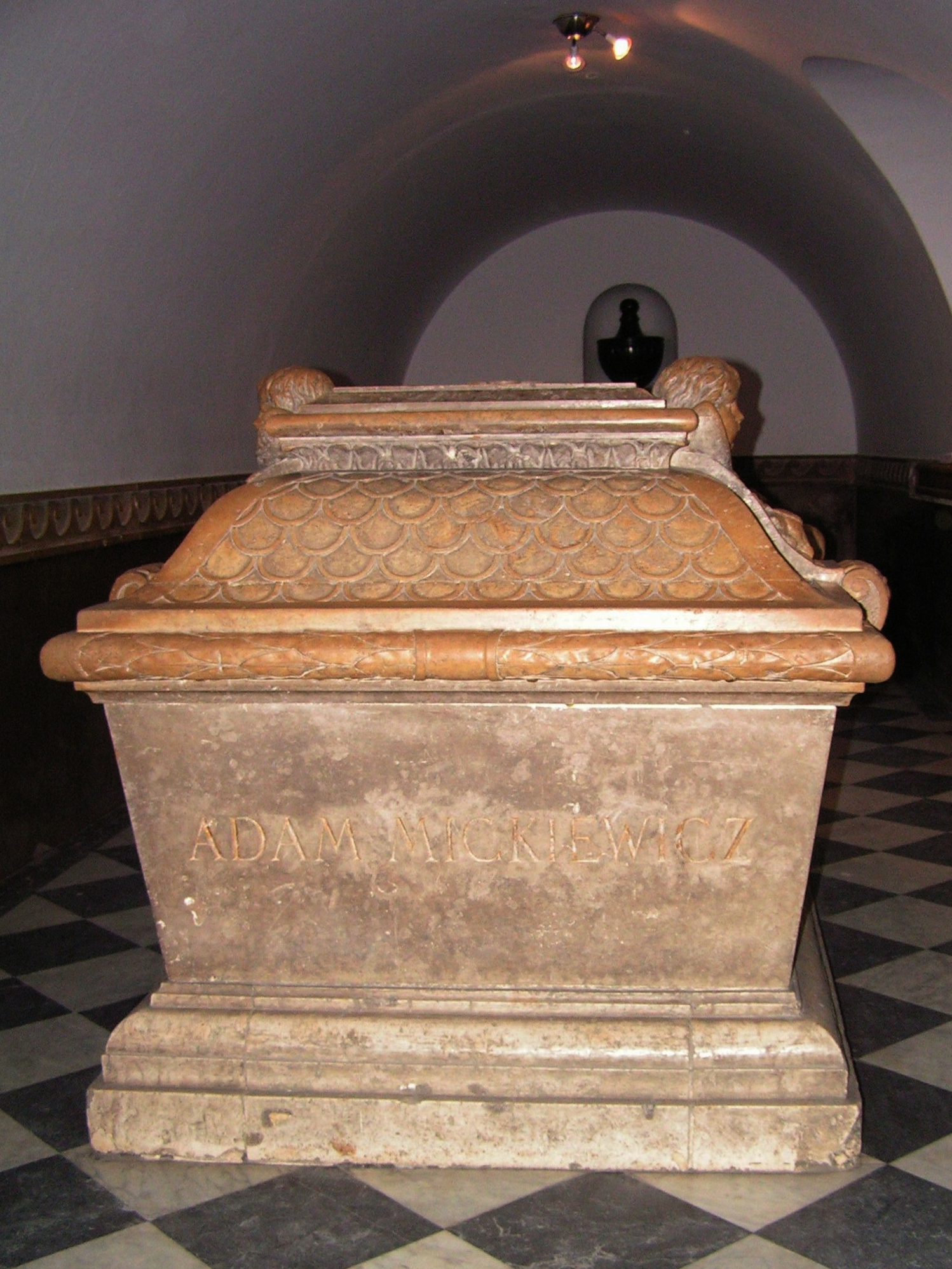
Mickiewicz's sarcophagus

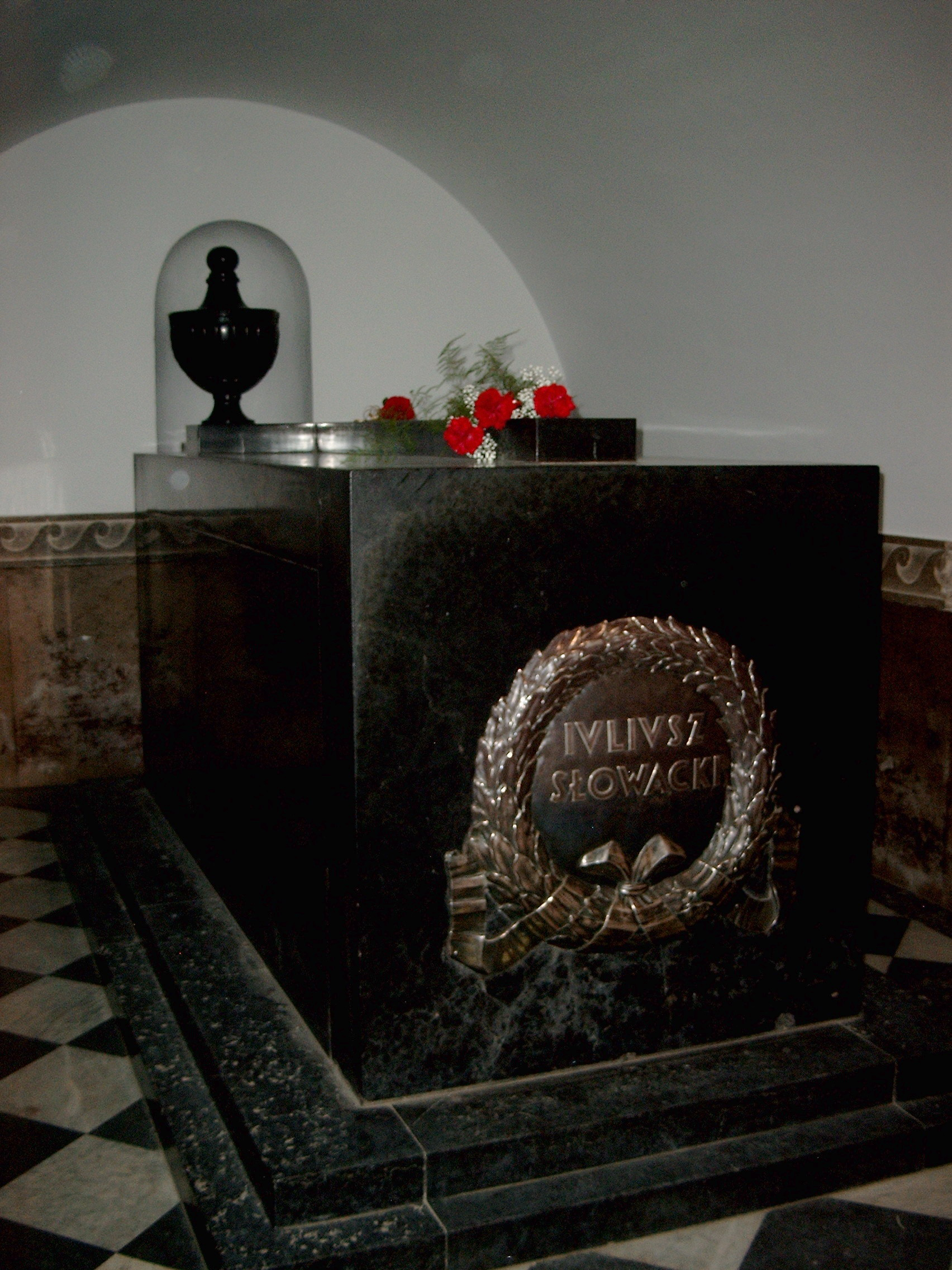
Słowacki's sarcophagus

=== Symbolic burial of Norwid ===
At the end of the 20th century, the idea of commemorating Cyprian Norwid in the National Bards crypt emerged. On 23 May 1993, the 110th anniversary of the poet's death, a bronze epitaph plaque in his honor, created by Czesław Dźwigaj, was unveiled near the entrance to the crypt. It was funded by the Józef Piłsudski National Remembrance Society and clergymen associated with the cathedral, including priests Stanisław Małysiak and Janusz Bielański (the then parson), and Cardinal Franciszek Macharski, the Archbishop of Kraków, who blessed the plaque.

A few years later, in 2001, Norwid's symbolic burial took place in the crypt. Since it was not possible to locate and identify his remains, at the initiative of Leszek Talko, president of the Historical-Literary Society in Paris, soil was taken from the mass grave in Cimetière des Champeaux de Montmorency, where the poet was buried. This was done ceremoniously on June 24, in the presence of representatives from the Polish Embassy, the Historical-Literary Society, the Society for the Care of Polish Graves in France, and the Institute of National Remembrance. The urn with the soil was transported to Rome, where it was blessed by Pope John Paul II on July 1, during a mass dedicated to the poet.

On 24 September, the 180th anniversary of Norwid's birth, with the ringing of The Sigismund Bell and following a solemn mass celebrated by Cardinal Macharski, the urn (made of brass and adorned with a broken heart in the shape of a lyre, designed by Czesław Dźwigaj) was placed in a small niche beside the epitaph plaque. The symbolic burial was attended by Prime Minister Jerzy Buzek and Minister of Culture and National Heritage Andrzej Zieliński. During the ceremony, a letter from Pope John Paul II dedicated to Norwid was read by Cardinal Macharski, and Zbigniew Zapasiewicz recited several of the poet's works, including Coś ty Atenom zrobił, Sokratesie.

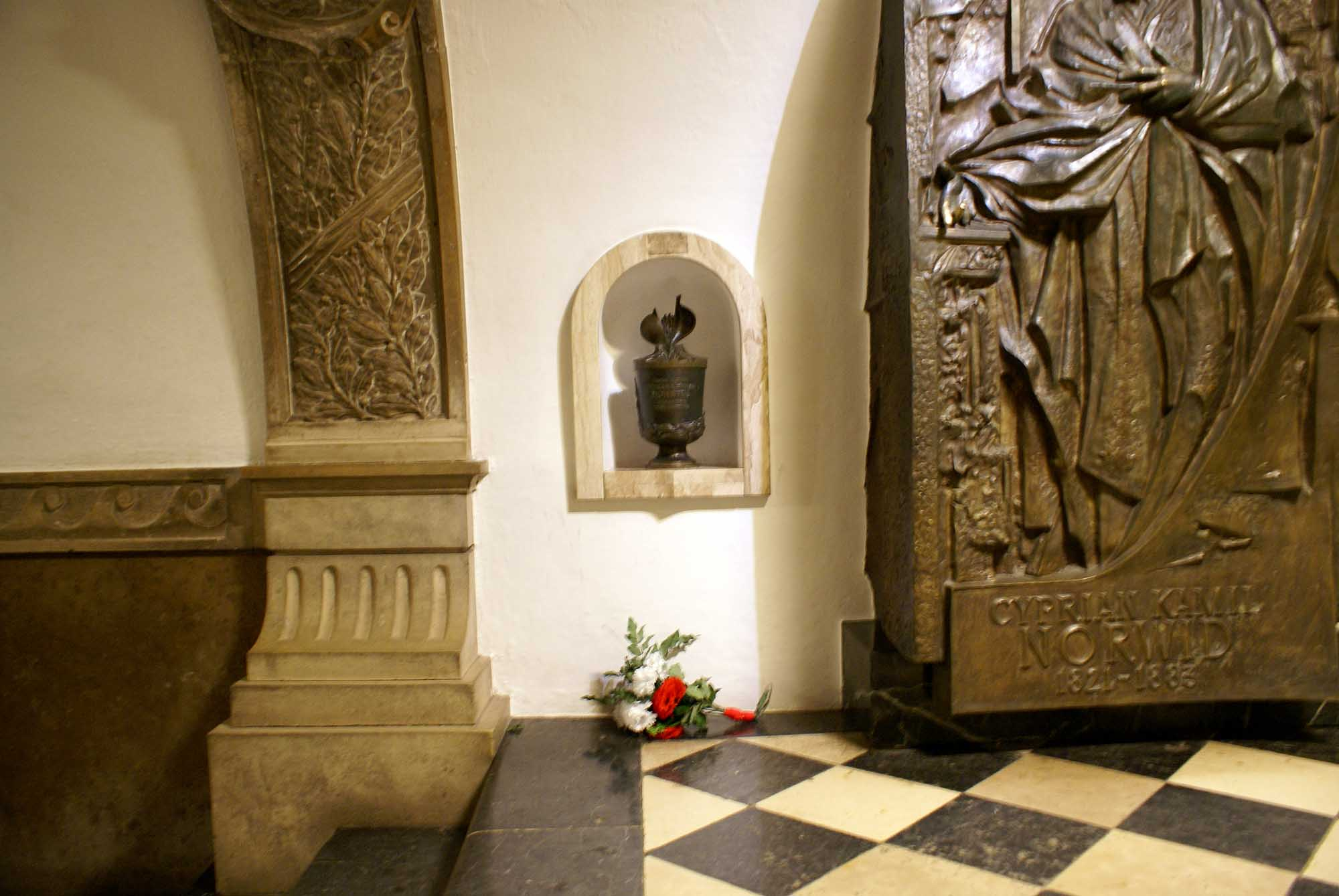
View of Norwid's epitaph plaque and urn with soil from his grave

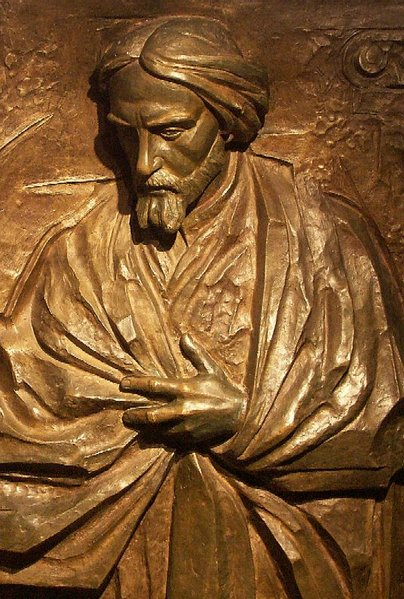
Fragment of the plaque in honor of Norwid

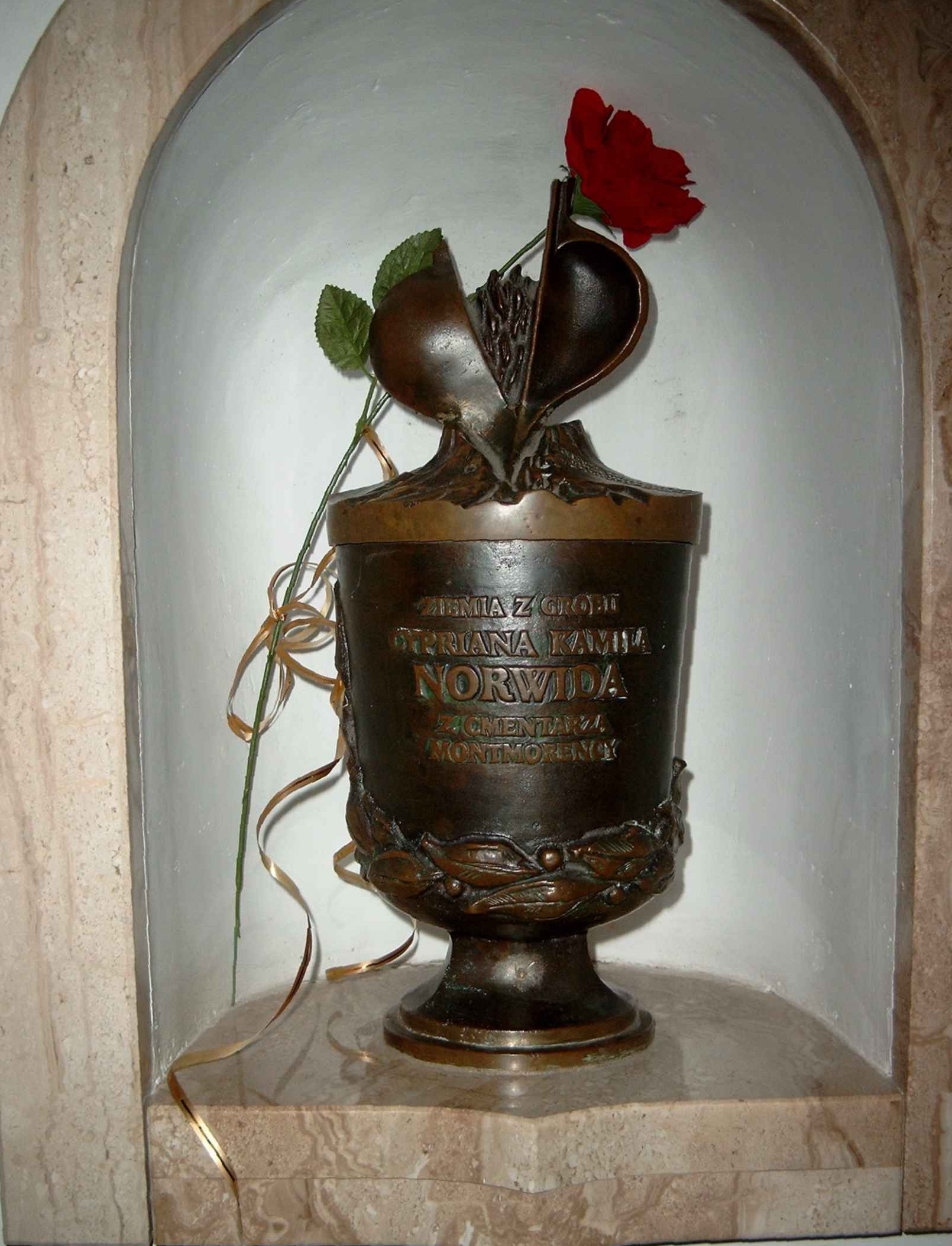
Urn with soil from Norwid's grave

=== Commemoration of Chopin ===
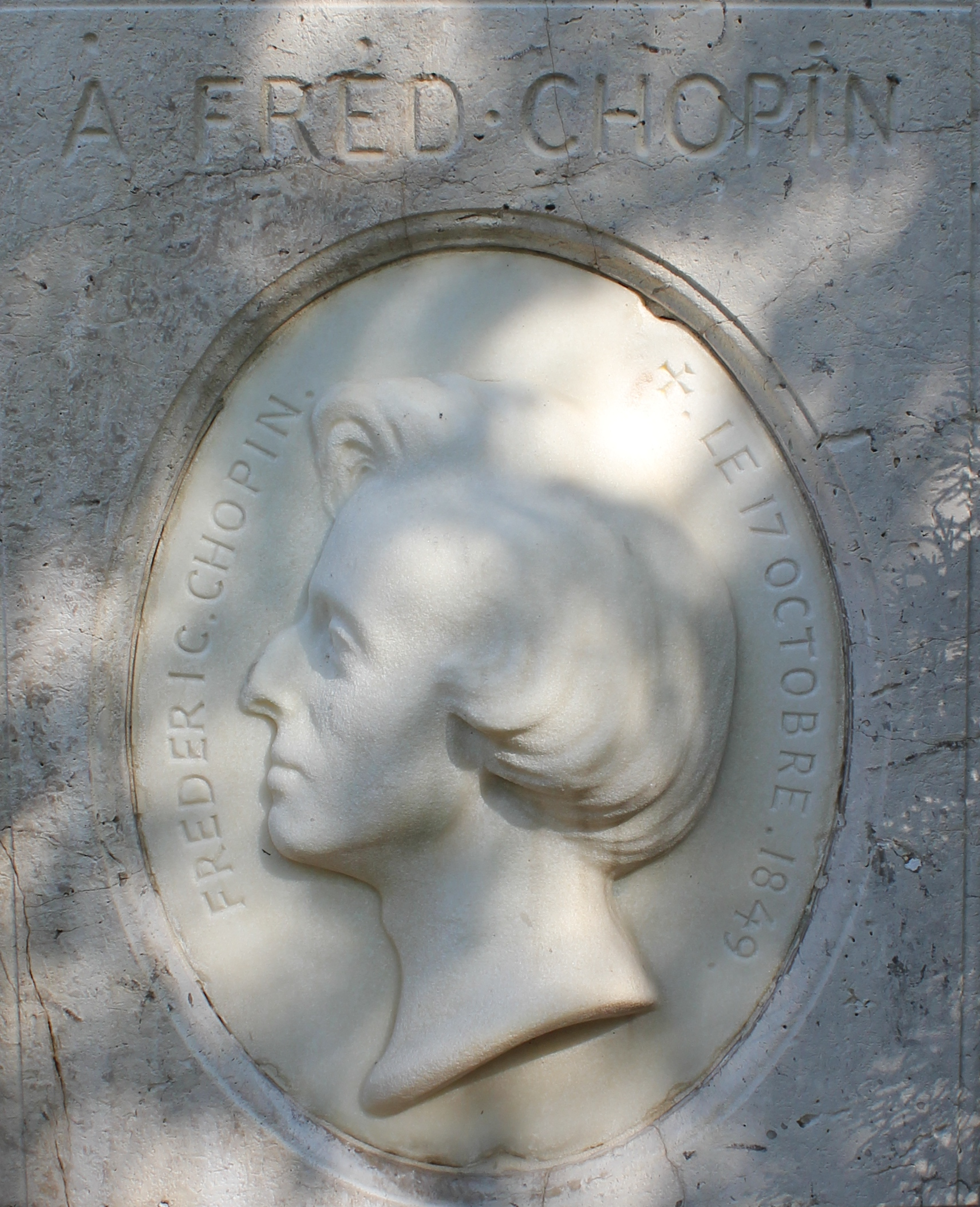
Fragment of Chopin's tombstone: medallion with the likeness of the pianist, a copy placed in the crypt

On 28 February 2010, Frédéric Chopin, the composer and pianist, a contemporary of Mickiewicz and Słowacki, was commemorated in the National Bards crypt. On the 200th anniversary of the artist's birth, a medallion was unveiled, a copy of the likeness from his tombstone at Père Lachaise Cemetery, created by Wojciech Kurdziel, made of white Greek marble, which was placed in a limestone slab with the inscription To the Great Artist – the Nation.

The idea of honoring the "poet of the piano" in this way was proposed by composer Stanisław Radwan and councilwoman Małgorzata Radwan-Ballada, while the medallion, placed opposite Norwid's slab, was funded by the authorities of Kraków. The unveiling was performed by Bogdan Zdrojewski, the Minister of Culture and National Heritage, Cardinal Stanisław Dziwisz, the Metropolitan of Kraków, and Jacek Majchrowski, the mayor of the city.

== Bibliography ==
- Czyżewski, Krzysztof J. (2002). Królewska katedra na Wawelu [Royal Cathedral on Wawel Hill] (in Polish). Kraków: Wydawnictwo św. Stanisława BM Archidiecezji Krakowskiej. ISBN 83-88971-37-9.
- Stachowski, Antoni Henryk, ed. (2000). Encyklopedia Krakowa [Encyclopedia of Kraków] (in Polish). Warsaw; Kraków: Polish Scientific Publishers PWN. ISBN 83-01-13325-2.
- Szablowski, Jerzy, ed. (1965). Katalog zabytków sztuki w Polsce [Catalogue of Artistic Monuments in Poland] (in Polish). Vol. IV. Warsaw: Instytut Sztuki Polskiej Akademii Nauk.
- Michalik, Marian B., ed. (1996). Kronika Krakowa [Chronicle of Kraków] (in Polish). Warsaw: Kronika. ISBN 83-86079-07-X.
- Nowak, Janusz Tadeusz (1986). "Pogrzeb Juliusza Słowackiego w Krakowie w 1927 r. (w 60-tą rocznicę sprowadzenia prochów wieszcza do kraju)" [The Funeral of Juliusz Słowacki in Kraków in 1927 (on the 60th Anniversary of Bringing the Poet's Ashes Back to the Country)]. Krzysztofory. Zeszyty Naukowe Muzeum Historycznego Miasta Krakowa (in Polish). 13.
- Rokosz, Mieczysław (2006). Dzwony i wieże Wawelu [Bells and Towers of Wawel] (in Polish). Kraków: Societas Vistulana. ISBN 83-88385-73-9.
- Rożek, Michał (2015). Groby Królewskie na Wawelu [Royal Tombs at Wawel] (in Polish) (IV ed.). Kraków: Petrus. ISBN 978-83-7720-257-9.
- Rożek, Michał (2015). Krakowska katedra na Wawelu. Dzieje – ludzie – sztuka – zwyczaje [Kraków Cathedral on Wawel: History – People – Art – Customs] (in Polish) (III ed.). Kraków: Petrus. ISBN 978-83-938389-2-9.
- Rożek, Michał (1995). Wawel i Skałka. Panteony polskie [Wawel and Skałka: Polish Pantheons] (in Polish) (III ed.). Wrocław; Warsaw; Kraków: Zakład Narodowy im. Ossolińskich. ISBN 83-04-04058-1.
- Świątecka, Maria (1956). "Sprowadzenie zwłok Adama Mickiewicza do kraju" [The Return of Adam Mickiewicz's Remains to the Country]. In Rederowa, Danuta (ed.). Kraków Mickiewiczowi [Kraków for Mickiewicz] (in Polish). Kraków: Wydawnictwo Literackie.
