= Kordian =

1834 drama written by Juliusz Słowacki

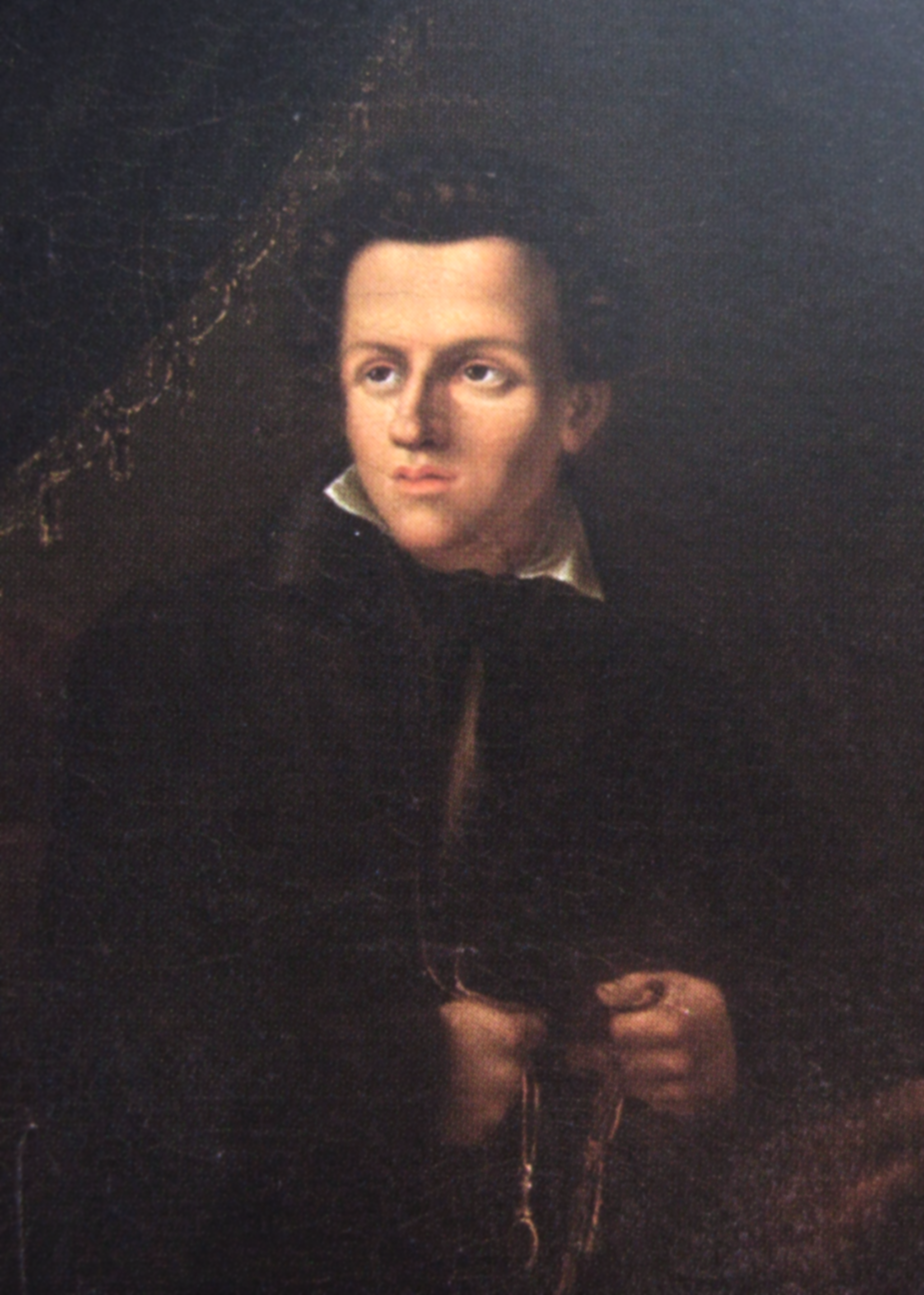
Juliusz Słowacki

Kordian: First Part of a Trilogy: The Coronation Plot (Polish: Kordian: Część pierwsza trylogii. Spisek koronacyjny), simply known as Kordian, is a drama written in 1833, and published in 1834, by Juliusz Słowacki, one of the "Three Bards" of Polish literature.

Kordian is one of the most notable works of Polish Romanticism and drama, and is considered one of Słowacki's best works.

== History ==
Słowacki began work on Kordian about early 1833, completing it in late November that year, while he was in Switzerland. It was published next year in Paris, anonymously, leading to speculation that it might have been written by the foremost Polish poet, Adam Mickiewicz. Still, it received little positive notice in the first years after its publication. It premiered in 1889 in Austrian-held Kraków, at the theatre now named after Słowacki. It had to wait until 1916 for its first performance in Russian-held Warsaw.

Another notable production occurred in 1956 under Erwin Axer. Other leading directors who have staged Kordian include Leon Schiller (in the 1930s) and Jerzy Grotowski (1962). The play has become a classic of Polish theatre repertory.

Though Kordian's title and some of Słowacki's letters indicate that he had planned to write, and may actually have written drafts of, second and third parts, they were never published and, if written, were either destroyed or remain lost.

Kordian has been required reading in Polish schools. In 1994 it aired on Polish TV Theatre.

== Plot ==
After Kordian, a 15-year-old romantic, suffers rejection in love and survives a suicide attempt, he travels through Europe, learning the importance of money. He changes from an adolescent dreamer into a youth in quest of a purpose; in a moment of epiphany, the tragic lover transforms into an idealistic patriot. Inspired by Arnold von Winkelried, he resolves to devote his life to assassinating Russian Tsar Nicholas I (Russia having been one of Poland's three partitioners). Ultimately Kordian fails in his mission because of qualms over the ethics of assassination—but possibly escapes with his life. The ending of the drama remains open.

The play was translated into English for the first time by Gerard T. Kapolka (The Green Lantern Press, 2011).

== Analysis ==
Kordian comprises three acts, written in rhymed Polish alexandrines.

The play, inspired by the failure of the November 1830 Uprising, is a study of a Polish romantic revolutionary's psyche. Kordian — his name was coined by Słowacki — is a typical romantic hero torn by his emotions. The play is also a polemic and a critique of romantic heroes in general, and in particular that of Mickiewicz's Dziady (Forefathers' Eve, 1823). Kordian is often contrasted with the latter's hero, Konrad, as Kordian contemplates a dishonorable means to achieve victory (assassination) and fails in his task. Słowacki intended to do more than merely show his disappointment with the failure of the November 1830 Uprising; he questioned whether Poland's fate was—as Mickiewicz suggested—in the hands of God, rather than being the plaything of Satan.

Słowacki employed old devices as well as new ones, previously not widely used in romantic dramas. He borrowed devices from Shakespeare (Kordian is often compared to Hamlet) but also emphasized fantastic elements as well as contemporary, real-world political events. Imitating Byron's ironical attitude, Słowacki in the introduction to his poem treats the contemporary actors in the revolution rather flippantly.

Kordian is considered a difficult piece to analyze and interpret. A common interpretation, seen by more recent scholars as unsatisfactory, is that of Kordian as a critique of romantic ideals.

== Cultural influences ==
Kordian has inspired the short story "Gotyk" (Gothic) by Jacek Dukaj (published in Xavras Wyżryn i inne fikcje narodowe, 2004), which is a science-fiction continuation of Kordian.

== Influences ==
- Leon Kruczkowski, Kordian i cham
- Jacek Dukaj, Gotyk

== See also ==
- Assassinations in fiction
- List of Poles
