= Juliusz Słowacki =

Polish Romantic poet (1809–1849)

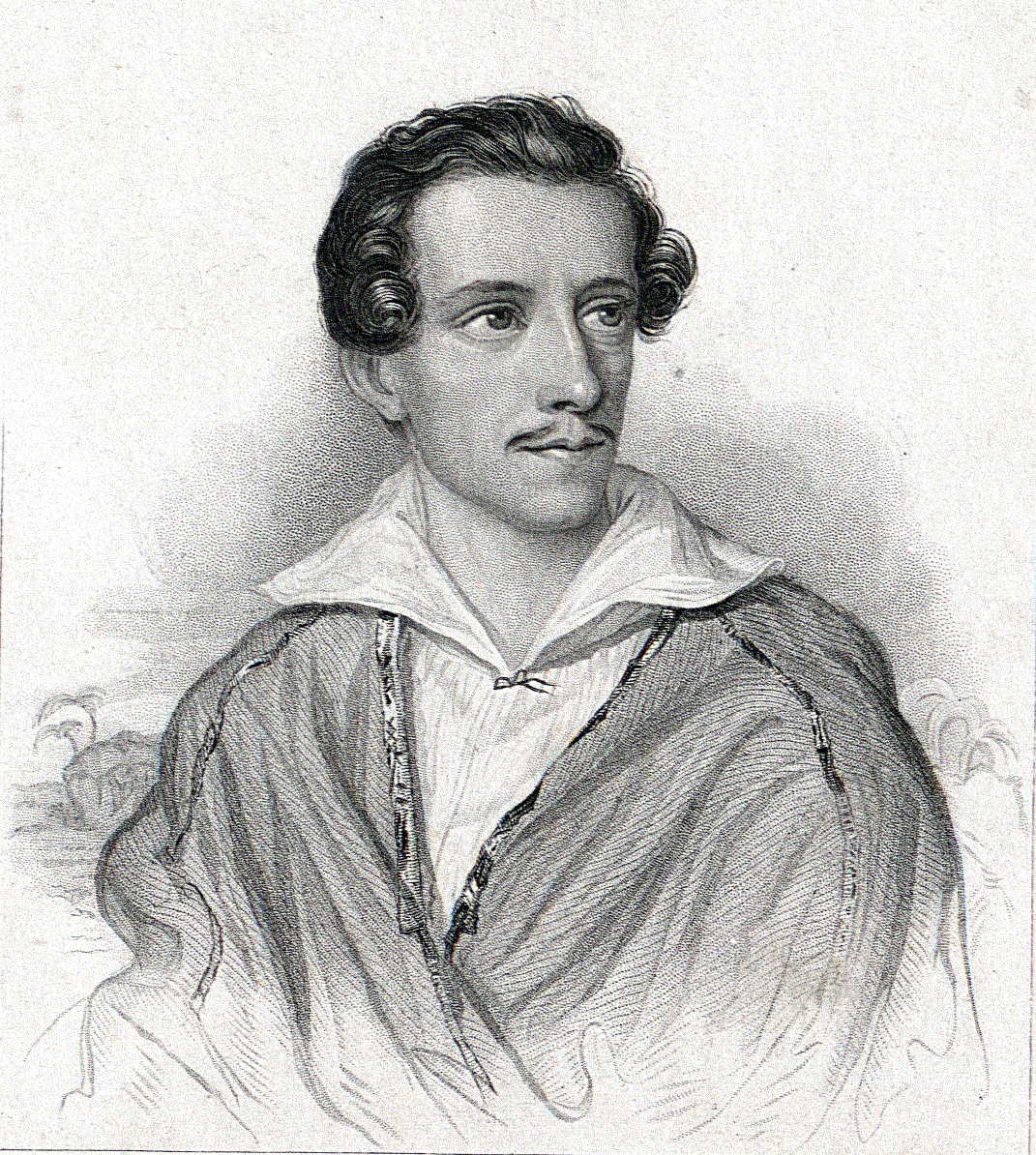
- Słowacki, by James Hopwood
- Born: Juliusz Słowacki; 4 September 1809; Kremenets, Russian Empire
- Died: 3 April 1849 (aged 39); Paris, France
- Education: Vilnius Imperial University
- Occupations: Poet, essayist
- Writing career
- Language: Polish
- Period: 1830 – posthumously
- Genres: dramas, lyrical poems
- Notable works: Kordian; Balladyna; Anhelli; Testament mój
- Movement: Romanticism

Signature
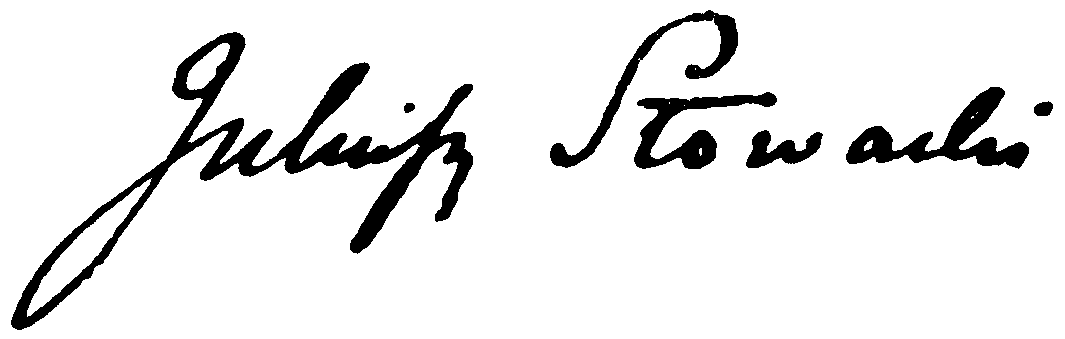

Juliusz Słowacki (/sloʊˈvɑːtski/; Polish: [ˈjuljuʂ swɔˈvat͡skʲi]; French: Jules Slowacki; 4 September 1809 – 3 April 1849) was a Polish Romantic poet. He is considered one of the "Three Bards" of Polish literature — a major figure in the Polish Romantic period, and the father of modern Polish drama. His works often feature elements of Slavic paganism, Polish history, mysticism and orientalism. His style includes the employment of neologisms and irony. His primary genre was the drama, but he also wrote lyric poetry. His most popular works include the dramas Kordian and Balladyna and the poems Beniowski, Testament mój and Anhelli.

Słowacki spent his youth in the so-called "Stolen Lands" within the Russian Empire, in Kremenets (Polish: Krzemieniec, now in Ukraine) and in Vilnius (now Lithuania). He briefly worked for the government of the Kingdom of Poland. During the November 1830 Uprising, he was a courier for the Polish revolutionary government. When the uprising ended in defeat, he found himself abroad and thereafter, like many compatriots, lived the life of an émigré. He settled briefly in Paris, France, and later in Geneva, Switzerland. He also traveled through Italy, Greece and the Middle East. Eventually he returned to Paris, where he spent the last decade of his life. He briefly returned to Poland when another uprising broke out during the Spring of Nations (1848).

== Life ==
=== Youth ===
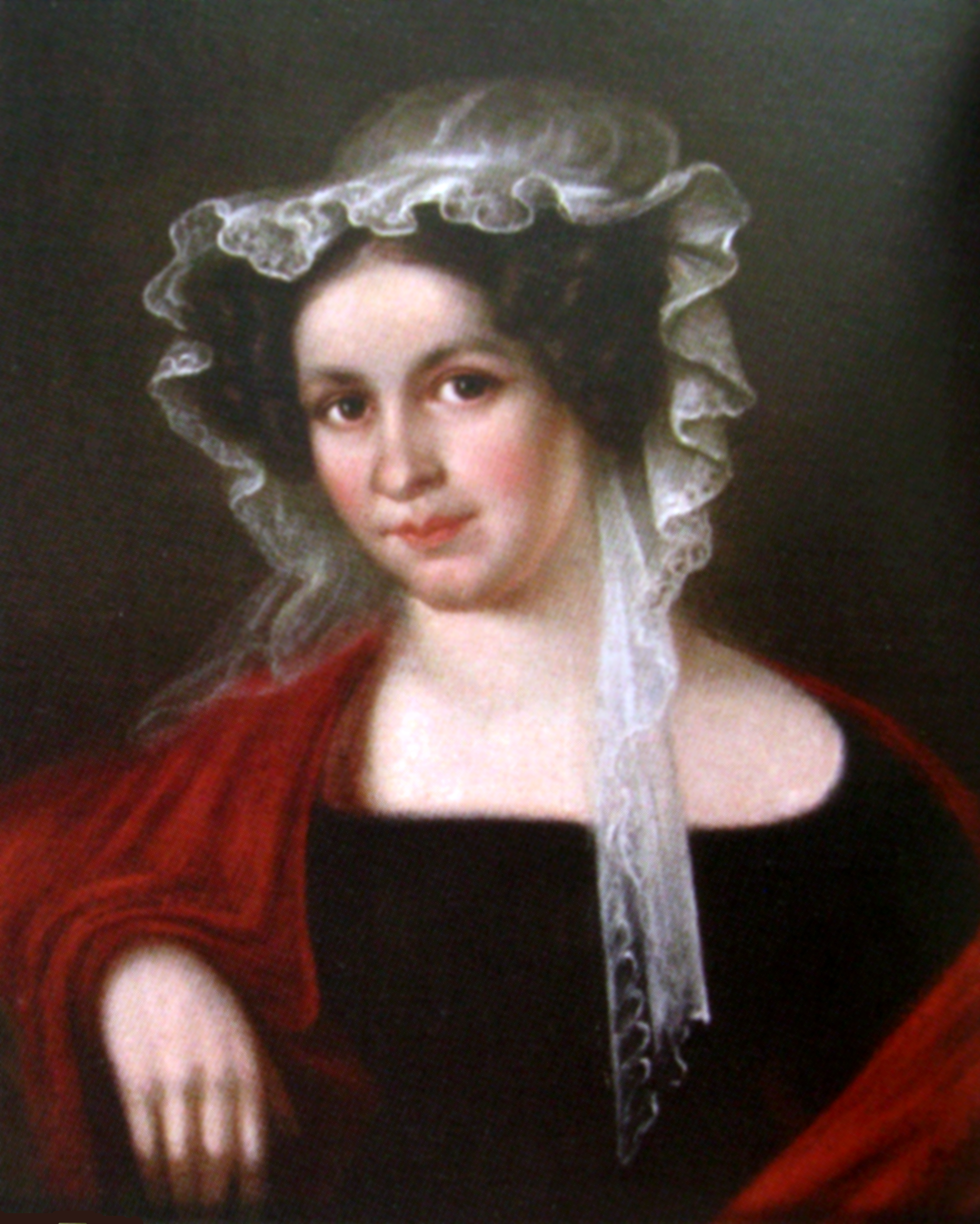
Poet's mother, Salomea, née Januszewska

Słowacki was born on 4 September 1809 at Kremenets (in Polish, Krzemieniec), Volhynia, formerly part of the Polish–Lithuanian Commonwealth but then in the Russian Empire and now in Ukraine.

His father, Euzebiusz Słowacki, a Polish nobleman of the Leliwa coat of arms, taught rhetoric, poetry, Polish language, and the history of literature at the Krzemieniec Lyceum in Kremenets; from 1811 he held the chair (katedra) of rhetoric and poetry at Vilnius Imperial University. He died in 1814, leaving Juliusz to be raised solely by his mother, Salomea Słowacka (née Januszewska). In 1818 she married a professor of medicine, August Bécu. She ran a literary salon where young Juliusz was exposed to diverse influences. It was there in 1822 that the 13-year-old met Adam Mickiewicz, the first of the Three Bards of Polish literature. Two years later, in 1824, Mickiewicz was arrested and exiled by the Russian authorities for his involvement in a secret patriotic Polish student society, the Philomaths; Słowacki likely met with him on Mickiewicz's final day in Vilnius.

Słowacki was educated at the Krzemieniec Lyceum, and at a Vilnius Imperial University preparatory gymnasium in Vilnius. From 1825 to 1828 he studied law at Vilnius Imperial University. His earliest surviving poems date to that period, though he presumably wrote some earlier, none of which have survived. In 1829 he moved to Warsaw, where he found a job in Congress Poland's Governmental Commission of Revenues and Treasury. In early 1830 he debuted his literary career with the novel Hugo, published in the periodical Melitele. That year, the November Uprising began, and Słowacki published several poems with patriotic and religious overtones. His Hymn, first published in Polak Sumienny (The Conscientious Pole) on 4 December 1830, and other works such as Ode to Freedom (Oda do Wolności), won acclaim and were quickly reprinted several times.

In January 1831 he joined the diplomatic staff of the revolutionary Polish National Government, led by Prince Adam Jerzy Czartoryski. Initially he served as a copyist. On 8 March 1831 he was sent on a courier mission to Dresden (some sources say this was not an official mission but a private journey). Many others left Warsaw around that time, in the aftermath of the Battle of Olszynka Grochowska and in expectation of a Russian advance on Warsaw. In Dresden, Słowacki was well received by the local Polish émigré community, and even welcomed as "the bard of fighting Warsaw." In July 1831 he volunteered to deliver messages from the National Government to its representatives in London and Paris, where he heard about the fall of the Uprising. Details of his mission (what letters he was carrying, and to whom) are not known.

=== Emigration ===
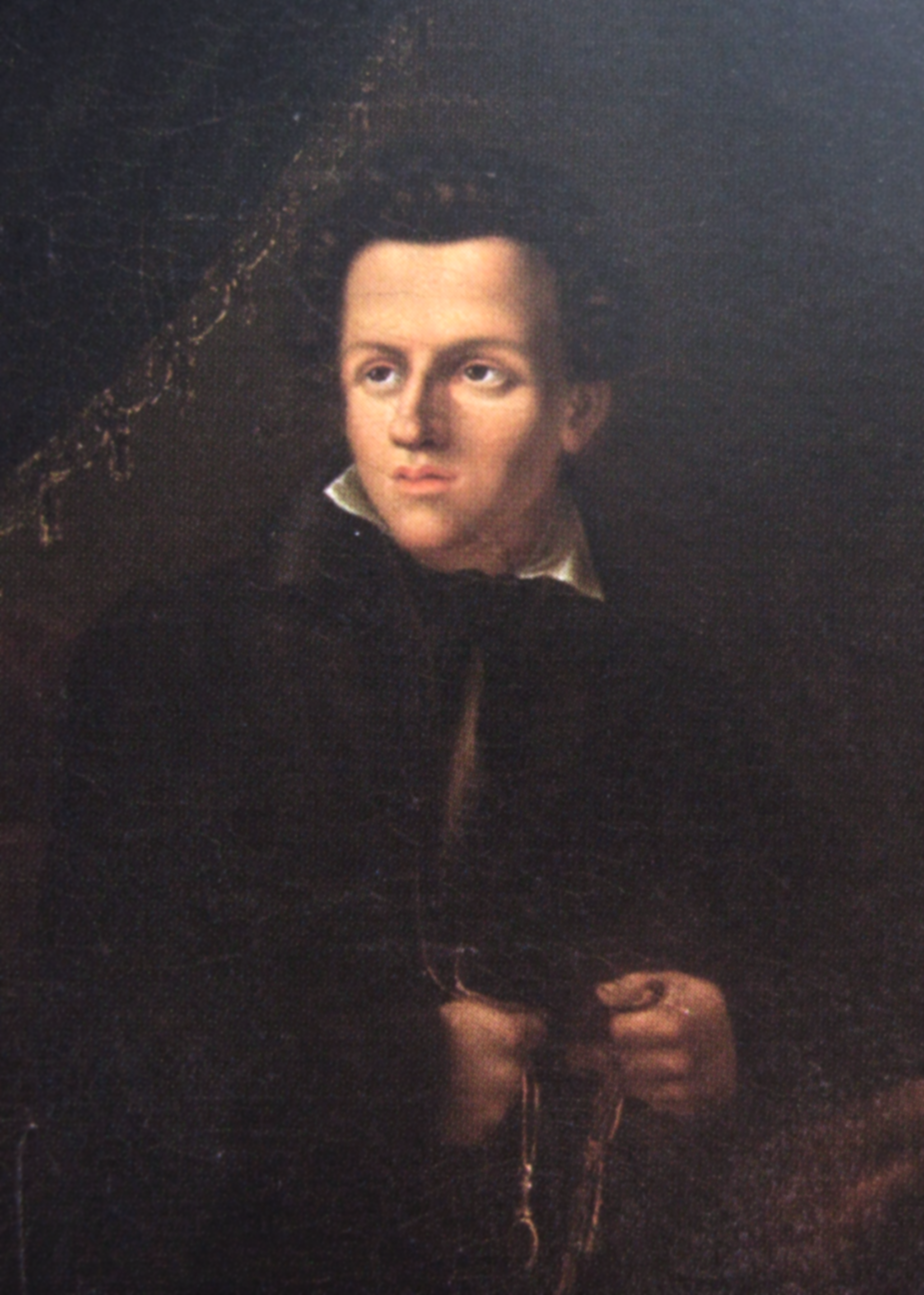
Słowacki in his younger years, depicted by Tytus Byczkowski

Like many of his countrymen, Słowacki decided to stay in France as a political refugee. In 1832 he published his first collections of poems and his first two dramas (Mindowe and Maria Stuart). He also met Mickiewicz again; reportedly, Mickiewicz approached his younger colleague and shook his hand. However, Słowacki's poems, written in the 1820s, were unpopular among his Polish compatriots, as they failed to capture the sentiment of a people living under foreign occupation. Słowacki was also angered by Mickiewicz, who not only stole the limelight with his Księgi narodu polskiego i pielgrzymstwa polskiego (Books of the Polish nation and pilgrimage), but his part three of Dziady (1832) cast Słowacki's stepfather, professor Bécu, in the role of a villain. In a letter to his mother Słowacki wrote that immediately after reading that work he was ready to challenge Mickiewicz for a duel; that did not come to pass but from that moment on, Słowacki would see Mickiewicz as his main rival. Few days later, antagonized by worsening reception of his works among the Polish émigré community in Paris, including sharp criticism from Mickiewicz, Słowacki left on a trip to Geneva, Switzerland. The French authorities denied him the right to return to France as part of a larger program to rid the country of the potentially subversive Polish exiles who had settled there.

From 1833 to 1836, he lived in Switzerland. The third volume of his poems, published in 1833 and containing works from the period of the Uprising, was far more nationalist in tone and won more recognition in his homeland. At the same time, he wrote several works featuring Romantic themes and beautiful scenery, such as W Szwajcarii (In Switzerland), Rozłączenie (Separation), Stokrótki (Daisies) and Chmury (Clouds).

In 1834 he published Kordian, a Romantic drama relating to the soul-searching of the Polish people in the aftermath of the failed insurrection; this work is considered one of his best creations.

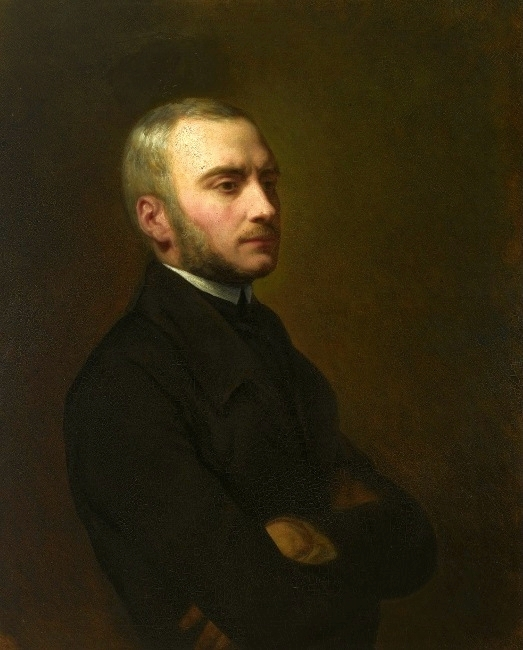
Zygmunt Krasiński

In 1836, Słowacki left Switzerland and embarked on a journey that started in Italy. In Rome he met and befriended Zygmunt Krasiński, the third of the Three Bards. Krasiński is considered the first serious literary critic of Słowacki's work. Słowacki would dedicate several of his works, including Balladyna, to Krasiński and they would exchange a number of letters. From Rome, Słowacki went to Naples and later, to Sorrento. In August he left for Greece (Corfu, Argos, Athens, Syros), Egypt (Alexandria, Cairo, El Arish) and the Middle East, including the Holy Land (Jerusalem, Bethlehem, Jericho, Nazareth) and neighboring territories (Damascus, Beirut). It was a journey Słowacki described in his epic poem Podróż do Ziemi Świętej z Neapolu ("Travel to the Holy Land from Naples"); his other works of that period inclucded the poem Ojciec zadżumionych (The Father of the Plague-stricken), Grób Agamemnona (Agamemnon's Grave), Rozmowa z piramidami (A talk with the pyramids), Anhelli and Listy poetyckie z Egiptu (Poetic Letters from Egypt). In June 1837 he returned to Italy, settling briefly in Florence, and moved back to Paris in December 1838.

In 1840 Mickiewicz was elected to the position of professor of Slavic literature at Collège de France; it was one of the events that cemented his position over Słowacki in the Polish émigré community. The rivalry between the two Bards for primacy would continue till the ends of lives. In 1841 Słowacki traveled briefly to Frankfurt, but Paris would become his main home till his death. In 1840 and 1841 he wrote two notable dramas: Mazepa, the only of his dramas that was put on stage during his lifetime, and Fantazy, published posthumously, well received by critics. Over the next few years Słowacki wrote and published many works, including Testament mój (My Last Will), in which he described his faith that his works would endure after his death.

Between 1841 and 1846, he published Beniowski, considered by some his best lyrical poetry. Starting as a story of a historical figure, it developed into a discussion of the poet's own life and opinions. In 1842 he joined the religious-philosophical group, Koło Sprawy Bożej (Circle of God's Cause), led by Andrzej Towiański. This group included, among others, Mickiewicz. Towiański's influence is credited with a new, mystical current in Słowacki's works, seen in works such as the Beniowski and the drama Ksiądz Marek (Father Mark). Słowacki left the Circle a year later, in 1843.

In the summers of 1843 and 1844 Słowacki traveled to Pornic, a resort on the Atlantic coast in Brittany. It was there, in 1844, that he wrote Genezis z Ducha (Genesis from the Spirit). This work introduced his philosophical system that would have a visible influence on his works in his last decade. Around 1839 Słowacki put his capital into the Parisian stock market. He was a shrewd investor who earned enough from the investments to dedicate his life to his literary career; he was also able to pay the costs of having his books published.

=== Last years ===
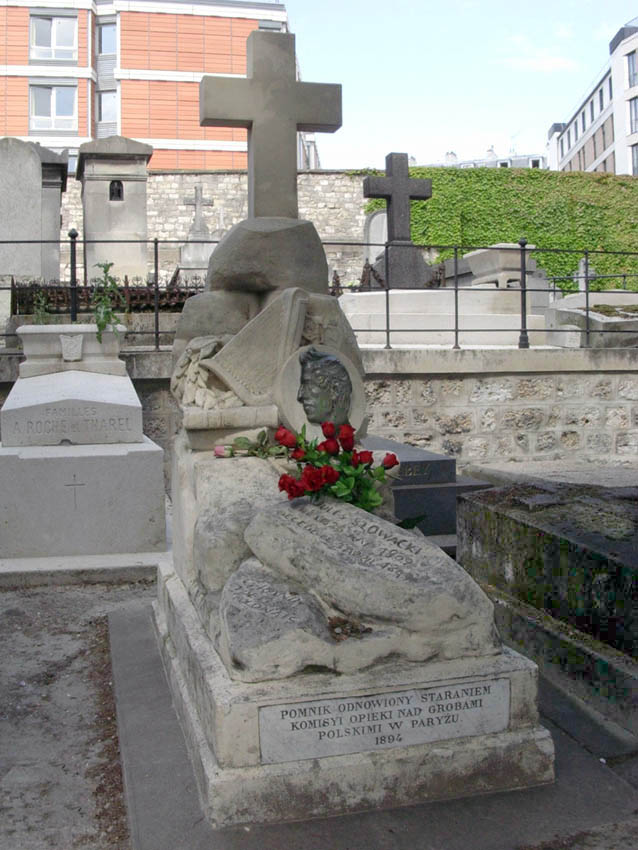
Tomb, Montmartre Cemetery, Paris

In the late 1840s Słowacki attached himself to a group of like-minded young exiles, determined to return to Poland and win its independence. One of his friends was the pianist and composer Frédéric Chopin. Others included enthusiasts of his work, such as Zygmunt Szczęsny Feliński, Józef Alojzy Reitzenheim and Józef Komierowski. Despite poor health, when he heard about the events of the Spring of Nations, Słowacki traveled with some friends to Poznań, then under Prussian control, hoping to participate in the Wielkopolska Uprising of 1848. He addressed the National Committee (Komitet Narodowy) in Poznań on 27 April. "I tell you", he declared as the rebels faced military confrontation with the Prussian Army, "that the new age has dawned, the age of holy anarchy." But by 9 May, the revolt was crushed.

Arrested by the Prussian police, Słowacki was sent back to Paris. On his way there, he passed through Wrocław, where in mid-June he was reunited with his mother, whom he had not seen for almost twenty years. He returned to Paris in July 1848. His poem Pośród niesnasków Pan Bóg uderza... (Among the discord God hits...), published in late 1848, gained new fame a century later when it seemed to foretell the 1978 ascent of Karol Wojtyła to the throne of St. Peter as Pope John Paul II. His final dramas (Zawisza Czarny, Samuel Zborowski), attempted to explain history of Poland through Słowacki's genesic philosophy. In March 1849, Słowacki, his health failing, was visited three times by another Polish writer and poet, Cyprian Norwid, who later wrote about his visits in Czarne kwiaty. Białe kwiaty (Black Flowers. White Flowers). Up to his final days, Słowacki was writing poetry; a day before his death he dictated passages of his final work, Król-Duch (King-Spirit). This grandiose, visionary-symbolic poem, "summary of the entire Romantic culture", Słowacki's masterpiece, weaving together Poland's history and its contemporary political and literary thought, was never finished.

Słowacki died in Paris on 3 April 1849 from tuberculosis, and on 5 April he was buried in the Montmartre Cemetery in Paris. He never married. Only about 30 people attended his funeral. Krasiński, although estranged from Słowacki in the last few years, wrote of the funeral:

There were 30 compatriots at the funeral – nobody rose to speak, nobody uttered even one word to honour the memory of the greatest master of Polish rhymes

Słowacki's tombstone at Montmartre was designed by his friend and executor of his last will, painter Charles Pétiniaud-Dubos; it did not weather the passage of time well however, and in 1851 a new, similar tombstone was put in place, this one designed by Polish sculptor Władysław Oleszczyński. In 1927 Słowacki's remains were moved to Wawel Cathedral in Poland, but an empty grave still remains at Montmartre.

== Work ==
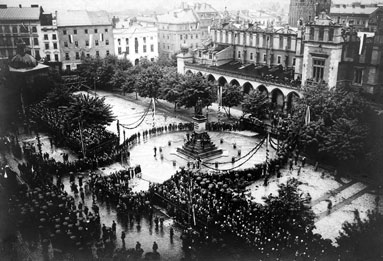
Funeral, Kraków, 1927

Słowacki was a prolific writer; his collected works (Dzieła wszystkie) were published in 17 volumes. His legacy includes 25 dramas and 253 works of poetry. He wrote in many genres: dramas, lyrical poems, literary criticism, letters, journals and memoirs, fragments of two novels, and a political brochure; he was also a translator. His letters to his mother are among the finest letters in all Polish literature.

Although the majority of his works were in Polish, he tried his hand at several works in French language (Le roi de Landawa, Beatrix Cenci). Many of his works were published only posthumously, often under arbitrary titles, as Słowacki never named them himself. He also left notes on works that he never began or never completed. Słowacki is also considered the father of modern Polish drama.

Polish literary historian Włodzimierz Szturc divides Słowacki's work into four periods: Wolter's circle (pseudoclassicism), Christian ethic, Towiański's ethic and genesic ethic. Other scholars offer slightly different periodizations; for example dividing his works into a classical period, a Swiss period, a Parisian period and a genesis period. Philologist Jarosław Ławski combines Towiański's period with the genesic ones, speaking of a "mystical" period. Overall, Słowacki's early work was influenced by Byron and Shakespeare, and included works that was often historical in nature, like (as in Maria Stuart or Mindowe), or exotic, Oriental locales (as in Arab). His work took on a more patriotic tone following the failed November Uprising of 1830–1831. His final works are heavy in mystical and philosophical undertones. In the 1840s he developed his own philosophy, or mystical system, with works such as Król-Duch and Genesis z Ducha being an exposition of his philosophical ideas ("genesic philosophy") according to which the material world is an expression of an ever-improving spirit capable of progression (transmigration) into constantly newer forms. As Ławski notes, his philosophical works can transcend clear boundaries of simple literary genres.

Słowacki's works, situated in the period of romanticism in Poland, contain rich and inventive vocabulary, including many neologisms. They use fantasy, mysticism and symbolism and feature themes related to Poland's history, essence of Polishness, and relation to a larger universe. Ławski, enumerating the main characteristics of Słowacki's writings, notes first that he was a "creationist", in the sense of creating new meanings and words (many of his characters bear names he invented himself, such as Kordian). Second, he notes that Słowacki was not only inspired by works of others, from poets and writers to scholars and philosophers, but that his texts were often a masterful, ironic-grotesque polemic with other creators. For example, Słowacki was so impressed by Antoni Malczewski's Maria that he wrote a sequel to it, Jan Bielecki. Likewise, Kordian is seen as building on William Shakespeare's Hamlet, and as Słowacki's response to Mickiewicz's Dziady. This Ławski calls "ivy-like imagination", comparing Słowacki's approach to that of an ivy, growing around works of others and reshaping them into new forms in a sophisticated literary game. Third, Słowacki was a master of irony; he used it not only on others, but on himself, and even on irony itself – the "irony of irony".

== Legacy ==
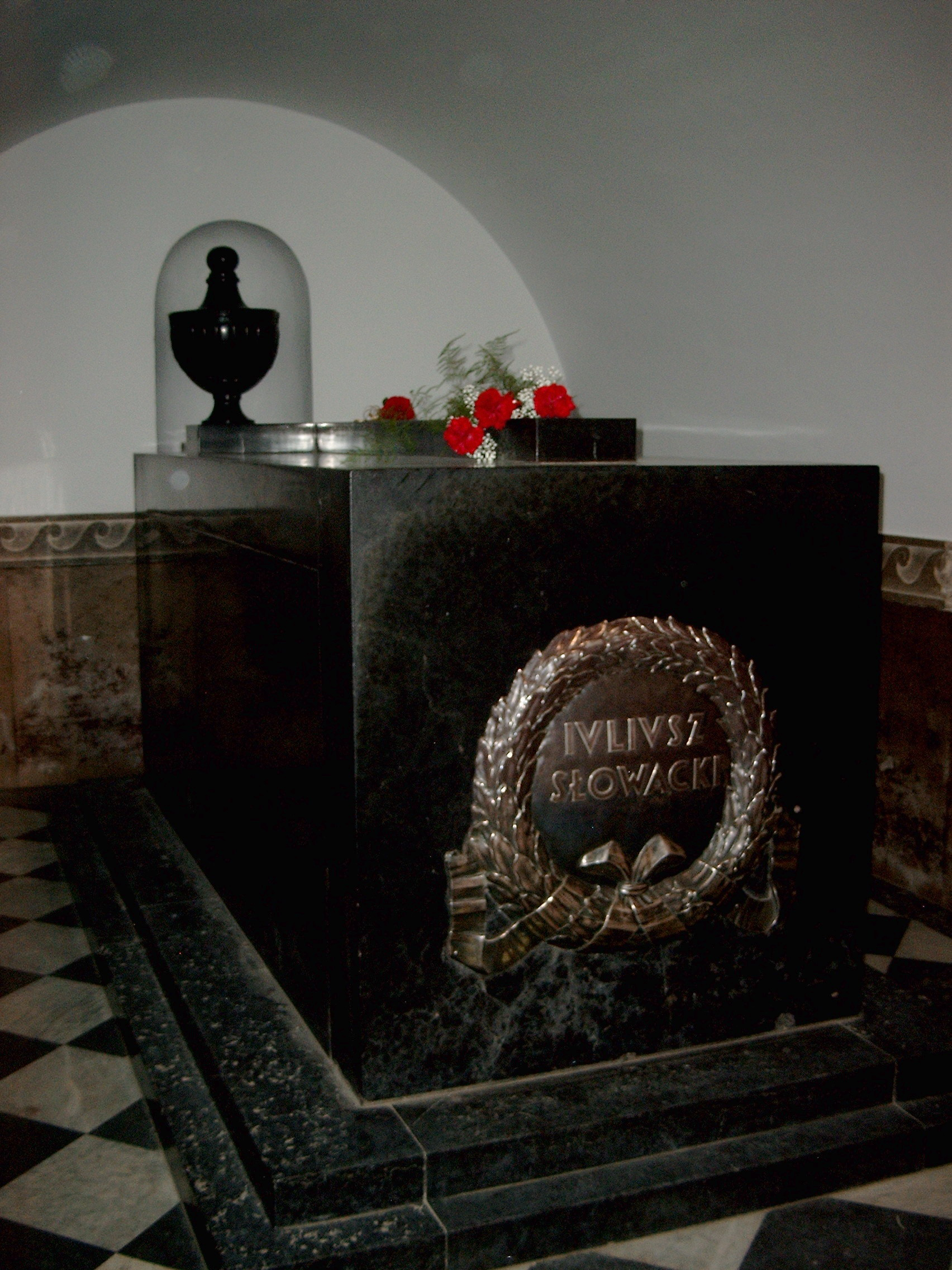
Tomb, Wawel Cathedral, Kraków

After his death, Słowacki acquired the reputation of a national prophet. He is now considered to be one of the "Three Bards" (Polish: trzej wieszcze) of Polish literature. Słowacki was not a very popular figure in Paris, nor among his contemporaries. He wrote many dramas, which can be seen as his favorite genre, yet he was a playwright who never saw any of his work performed on stage (only Mazepa was staged during his lifetime, and not in his presence). His works, written in Polish, dense with Slavic myths, philosophy and symbols, were difficult to translate to other languages. Słowacki's unpopularity among other Polish émigrés can be attributed to his unwillingness to pander to contemporary tastes; and in particular, his refusal to comfort his compatriots, shaken by the loss of Polish statehood and the failure of the November Uprising. Słowacki's ironic and sometimes pessimistic attitude was not appreciated by his contemporaries, nor was his denial of Polish uniqueness.

Whereas Mickiewicz followed the Messianic tradition and in Konrad suggested that Poland's fate was in the hands of God, Słowacki's Kordian questioned whether his country was not instead a plaything of Satan. However, the same work has God and the Angels watching over Poland and the Earth. In Anhelli, Słowacki's describes the tragic fate of Polish exiles in Siberia, painting a gloomy vision of Poland's destiny; the same topic was taken by Mickiewicz in the Books of the Polish Nation and of the Polish Pilgrimage as a call for Poles to spread hope and spirituality across Europe. While a small circle of his friends talked about his wit, perseverance and inspiration, in popular memory he was a "sickly man of weak character", egocentric, bitter due to his failed rivalry with Mickiewicz. Mickiewicz himself wrote of Słowacki's work as a "beautiful church, but without God inside".

After his death, Słowacki gained a cult-like status in Poland; in particular, in the cultural center of Kraków. Several obituaries and longer articles appeared in the Polish press upon Słowacki's death. His works, many of them published posthumously for the first time, found growing acceptance among a new generation; an 1868 work noted that "Słowacki took the fancy of the Polish youth. He was its singer, its spiritual leader in the full meaning of the term". Through undoubtedly a poet of the romantic era, he was increasingly popular among the positivists and the authors of the Young Poland period in the late 1800s and early 1900s. His works were popularized by other writers, such as Adam Asnyk and Michał Bałucki, and his dramas were shown in theaters. He became a major literary figure for the new generation of Polish writers. He also became respected abroad; a 1902 English language book edited by Charles Dudley Warner noted that "the splendid exuberance of his thought and fancy ranks him among the great poets of the nineteenth century".

In 1927, some eight years after Poland had regained independence, the Polish government arranged for Słowacki's remains to be transferred from Paris to Wawel Cathedral, in Kraków. He was interred in the Crypt of the National Bards, beside Mickiewicz. Słowacki's interment at Waweł Cathedral was controversial, as many of his works were considered heretical by Polish Catholic-Church officials. It took almost two decades and the backing of Józef Piłsudski, for whom Słowacki was a favorite poet, to obtain the Church's agreement to interring Słowacki at Wawel Cathedral. At the 1927 ceremony, Piłsudski commanded:

W imieniu Rządu Rzeczypospolitej polecam Panom odnieść trumnę Juliusza Słowackiego do krypty królewskiej, bo (Note: There are actually two versions of Piłsudski's pronouncement: "bo królom był równy" ("for he was the peer of kings"), and "by królom był równy" ("that he may be the peer of kings").) królom był równy.

Translation:

Gentlemen, in the name of the government of Poland I bid you carry the coffin of Juliusz Słowacki into the royal crypt, for he was the peer of kings.

Several streets and schools in modern Poland bear Juliusz Słowacki's name. Three parks are dedicated to him: in Bielsko-Biała, in Łódź and in Wrocław. (in Polish) There are several monuments of Juliusz Słowacki, including ones in Warsaw (2001) and Wrocław (1984).

Among the most notable landmarks bearing his name is the Juliusz Słowacki Theatre in Kraków, and the Juliusz Slowacki Museum in Kremenets, Ukraine, opened in 2004 at his family's former manor house. In 2009 the Polish Sejm (parliament) declared that year, the two-hundredth anniversary of Słowacki's birth, to be the Year of Juliusz Słowacki. The oldest monument to Juliusz Słowacki, unveiled in 1899, is in Miloslaw Park.

In 2014, his 205th birthday was honored with a Google Doodle.

== Selected works ==
=== Drama ===
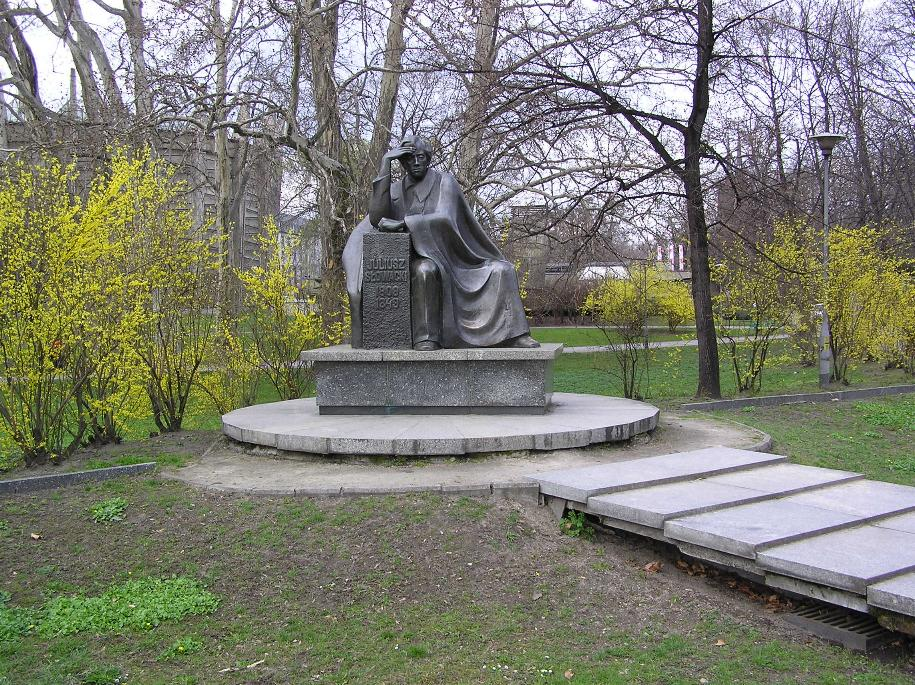
Słowacki monument, Wrocław

- Balladyna (1834, published 1839, performed 1862)
- Fantazy (1841, published 1866, performed 1867)
- Horsztyński (1835, published 1866, performed 1871)
- Kordian (1833, published 1834, performed 1899)
- Ksiądz Marek (Father Marek, 1843, published same year, performed 1901)
- Książę niezłomny (The Constant Prince, after Pedro Calderón de la Barca, 1843, published 1844, performed 1874)
- Lilla Weneda (1839, published 1840, performed 1863)
- Maria Stuart (1830, performed 1862)
- Mazepa (1839, published 1840, performed in Hungarian 1847, performed in Polish 1851)
- Sen srebrny Salomei (The Silver Dream of Salomea, 1843, published 1844, performed 1900)
- Samuel Zborowski (1845, published 1903, performed 1911)

=== Poetry ===
- Anhelli (1838)
- Arab (1830)
- Lambro, powstańca grecki (Lambro, a Greek insurgent, 1833)
- Beniowski (1841–1846)
- Genezis z Ducha (Genesis from the Spirit, 1844)
- Godzina myśli (An Hour of Thought, 1832–1833)
- Hugo. Powieść krzyżacka (Hugo. Teutonic Order Novel, 1830)
- Król-Duch (The Spirit King, portions published 1847, published in full 1925)
- Ojciec zadżumionych (The Father of the Plague-stricken, 1838)
- Podróż do ziemi świętej ("Voyage to the Holy Land", 1866)
- Testament mój (My Last Will, 1839–1840)
- W Szwajcarii (In Switzerland, 1835, published 1839)
- Wacław (1838)

Family coat-of-arms, Leliwa
