= Jełowicki family =

Ruthenian-Polish noble family

Bożeniec Jełowicki
- Princely House of Poland
- Jełowicki coat of arms
- Current region: Grand Duchy of Lithuania, Poland
- Origin: Smolensk Oblast, Jałowicze then Łanowce
- Members: Antonina Niemiryczowa; Edward Jełowicki; Aleksander Jełowicki; Jerzy Jełowicki
- Connected families: Czartoryski, Rzewuski, Radziwiłł
- Estates: Łanowce; Hubnik; Ożenin

The Jełowicki family (Ukrainian: Яловицькі, romanized: Jalovycjki), sometimes called Jałowiecki, (feminine form: Jełowicka, plural: Jełowiccy) is a Polish princely family of Ruthenian-Lithuanian origin, bearing the Jełowicki arms. They use the prefix Bożeniec. Their estates were originally in Volhynia to the east of the Kingdom of Poland. As Ruthenian nobility, they held the title of kniaz (prince). By the late 16th century, the family converted from Orthodox to Catholicism and became polonized. They eventually left their original settlements at Jałowicze/Jełowicze and Bożeniec. Following their victorious exploits against the invading Tartars King Casimir IV Jagiellon rewarded them in 1444 with the domain of Łanowce in present day Ukraine. They remained on the same land from father to son from 1444 to 1865. Across the centuries, the family produced many civic officials, Prelates and clergy. They are related to other notable houses in the region, including Czartoryski, Rzewuski and Ostrogski. The family is possibly the supposedly "extinct" branch of the Kropotkin family.

== History ==
=== Etymology of the name ===
Jełowicki stems from the place name Jałowicze, Jałowicz or Jełowicze, (Ukrainian: Яловичі, romanized: Jalovychi), in Rivne Oblast, where they were on the Lithuanian record since 1528. The village got its name from the word "yalovnyk" (Ukrainian: яловник; "young stock" or "young cattle", that is, calves). The village therefore probably originated as a dairy farm.

=== Princely title ===
Kasper Niesiecki SJ, the historian and genealogist, regards the family as descendants of the princes of Pereiaslav, and Józef Jabłonowski declares Izaslav prince of Pereiaslav to be their ancestor. According to another source, Adam Kosiński, the Jelowicki are likely descendants of the Kropotka Jełowicki family branch which apparently went extinct in the 16th-c. He argues this since their principal domain was Jalowicze/Jełowicz, and they used the Jełowicki seal indicating their origin as from Jełowicz. Moreover, on 28 February 1841 a decree of a special commission of certification granted the family the right to princely status confirmed by the Russian heraldic office in Saint Petersburg.

== Podolian branch ==
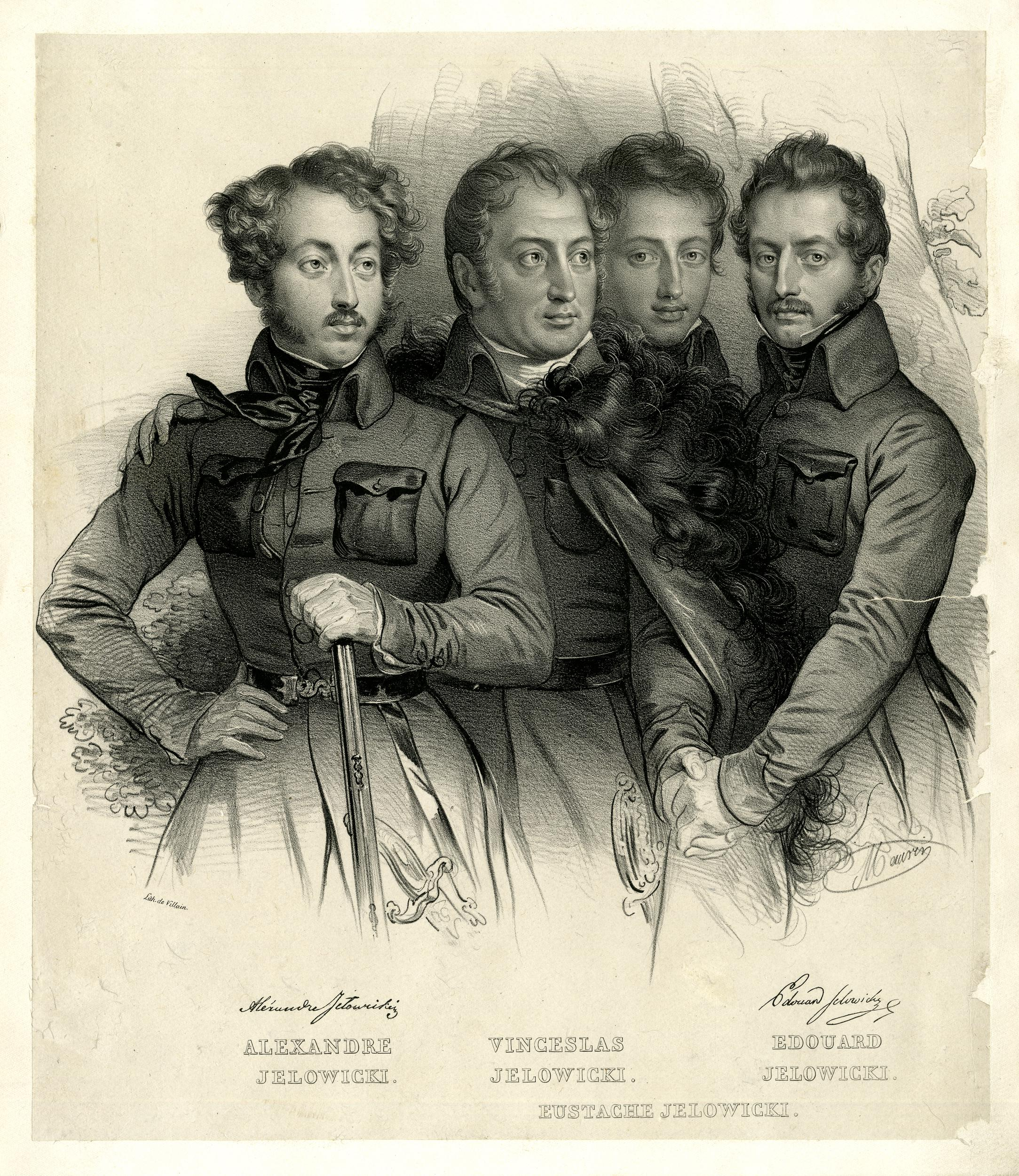
Contemporary etching of the November uprising from left to right Aleksander, Wacław Jełowicki father, Eustachy and Edward in 1831

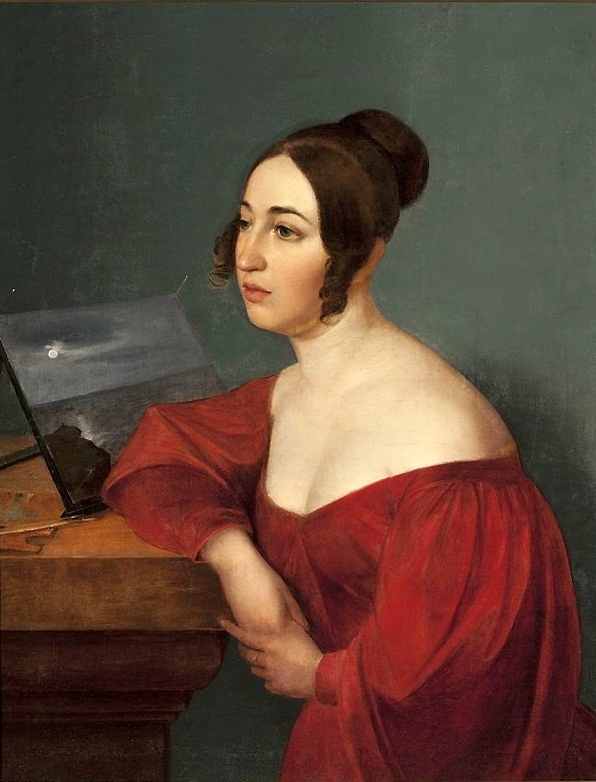
Hortensja Jełowicka Sobańska, daughter of Wacław by Wojciech Stattler

At the start of the 18th-century a branch of the family moved to Podolia to land in the Bratslav Voivodeship in the Vinnytsia Oblast where their huge estate was devoted to cereal production and prospered further with the opening and development of the port of Odessa from 1794.

Stefan Jełowicki married to an Iwankiewicz, became through her, heir to Antoni Jaroszyński and his property at Siennica in Mińsk Mazowiecki powiat.

In 1830 the Jełowicki of Podolia demonstrated their patriotism in the November Uprising. Wacław Jełowicki and his three sons Edward, Aleksander and Eustachy joined the battle in May 1831 but Waclaw momentarily separated from his sons was felled by a bullet.

== Notable family members ==
- Paszko Bożeniec Jełowicki (†1450) - vanquished the Tatars under Casimir IV Jagiellon
- Iwan Bożeniec Jełowicki (†1550)
- Gniewosz Bożeniec Jełowicki (†1565) - official to Sigismund II Augustus
- Sawa Bożeniec Jełowicki (†1590) - builder of Łanowce castle
- Zachariasz Jełowicki (†1629) – secretary to Sigismund III Vasa
- Józef Bożeniec Jełowicki (1667-1708) - Master of the hunt Volhynia
- Hieronim Jełowicki (1672–1732) – bishop
- Antonina Niemiryczowa (1702–1780), late baroque poet
- Stanisław Serwacy Jełowicki (1742–1811) – delegate to the Great Sejm
- Wacław Jełowicki (1778–1831) – landowner, insurgent
- Edward Jełowicki (1803–1848) – insurgent, colonel and inventor Virtuti Militari.
- Aleksander Jełowicki (1804–1877) – poet, publisher, priest Virtuti Militari
- Eustachy Jełowicki (1805–1869) – landowner, insurgent
- Teodor Jełowicki (1828-1905) - lawyer, musician, philanthropist
- Adolf Jełowicki (1840–1898) – philosopher
- Pelagia Popławska, née Jełowicka (1853–1915) – medical doctor, social activist
- Adolf Józef Jełowicki (1863–1937) – bishop, writer
- Witold Jełowicki (1874–1927) – judge
- Gustaw Jełowicki (1880–1965) – priest
- Tadeusz Stanisław Jełowicki (1897-1972) – army major, Virtuti Militari
- Jerzy Jełowicki (1899-1939) - agronomist, painter, Virtuti Militari
- Jerzy Karol Jełowicki (1941–2006) – membre du Conseil des Polonais of Belgium

== Coat of arms variants ==
COA Jełowicki

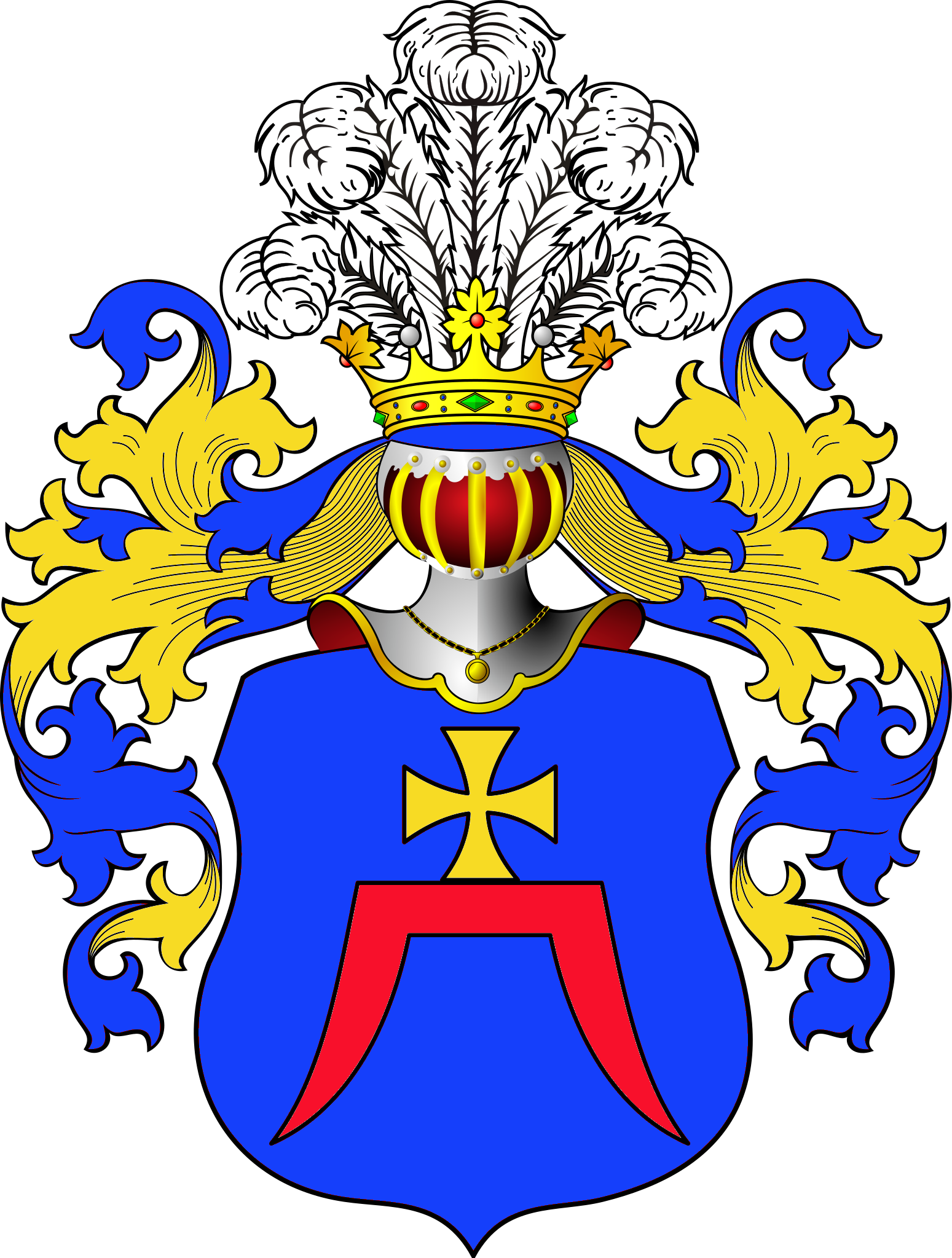
COA Jełowicki II

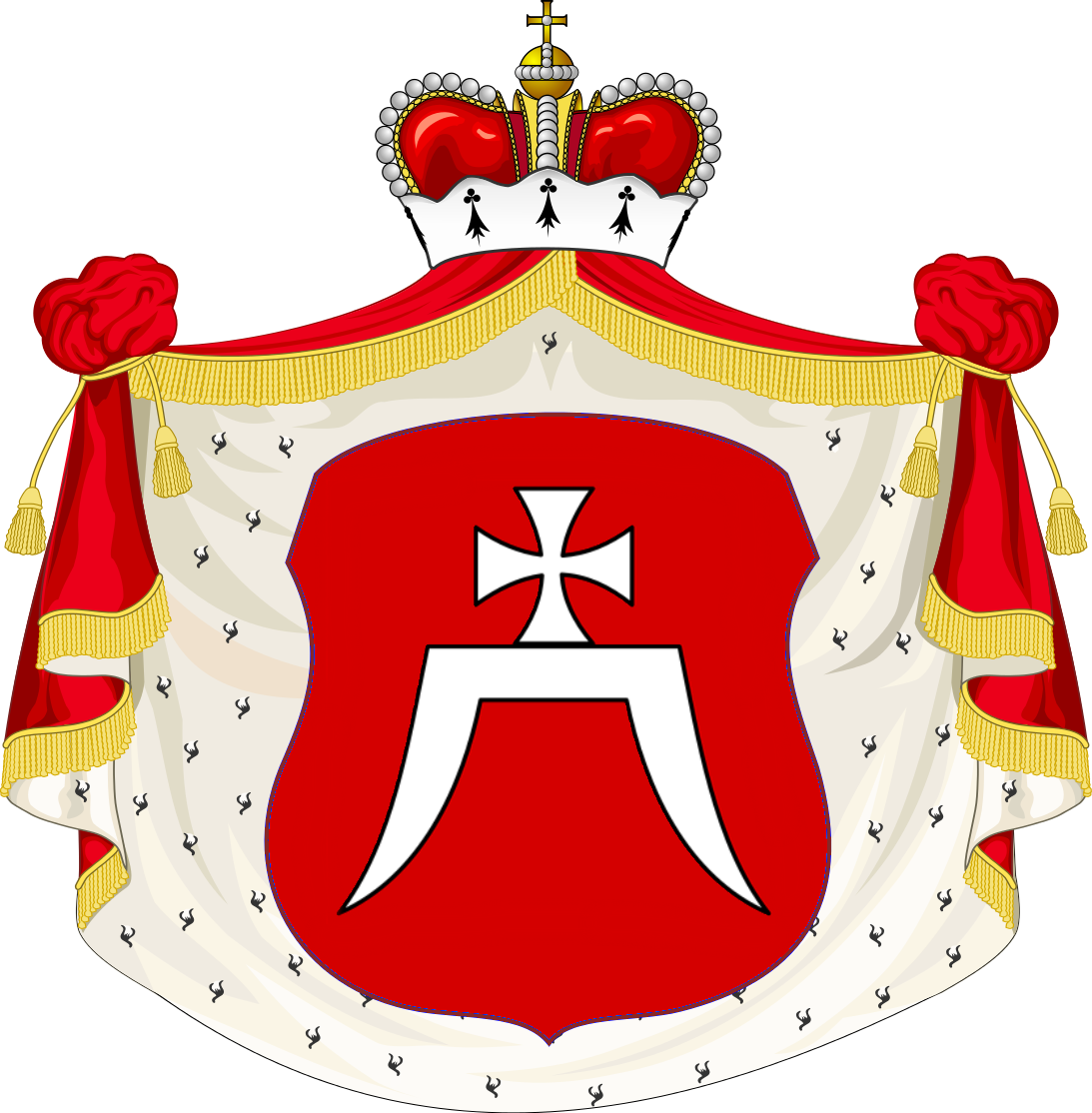
COA Jełowicki III (princely variant)

with different cross

== Family tree ==
The Jełowicki family tree is geographically based and draws on the Żychliński text.

"Linia główna" origin
Milczańsko-Kamieniecka Line	Łanowiecka Line
Ożenin Line	Łanowiecka Line
Ożenin Line	Mirohowska Line	Sokulska Line	Łanowiecka Line
Ożenin-Arentow Line	Mychlińska Line	Miroboska Line	Hranowska Line

Gniewosz Jełowicki (d. 1565), had four sons. Antoni, the second son began the Milczańsko-Kamieniecka line. The third son, Sawa, began the Łanowiecka line.

Sawa's sons were Hieronim, Adrian and Krzysztof. Hieronim, Castellan of Chełm died without issue.

Adrian, began the Ożenin line, which split into the Ożenin and Mirohoska lines. The Ożenin line further split into the Ożenin-Arentowska line and the Ożenin-Mychlińska Line. The Mirohowski line split further into the Hranowska and Miroboska branches.

Krzysztof began the Łanowiecka line, which remained on the original ancestral land. After the princess Sokulska dowry, it split into two further branches, the Sokulska and Lanowiecka branches. The Sokulska branch died out without male heirs.

The Łanowiecka line produced three brothers, Konstanty Stefan and Wacław. Wacław who died in the battle of Danow was the father of the executed Edward, of Aleksander and Eustachy Jełowicki. Descendants of Edward and Eustachy live in Poland and in the United Kingdom.

== See also ==
- Kropotkin family
- Polish nobility
- Lithuanian nobility
- Ruthenian nobility
- Szlachta

== Bibliography ==
Tomkiewicz W. Brzozowski Maksymilian, herbu własnego (†1659) Polski Słownik Biograficzny. — Kraków, 1937. — T. III/1, zeszyt 11. — p. 66. (1989) ISBN 83-04-03291-0
