= List of cities in Ternopil Oblast =

Location of cities in Ternopil Oblast

There are 18 populated places in Ternopil Oblast, Ukraine, that have been officially granted city status (Ukrainian: місто, romanized: misto) by the Verkhovna Rada, the country's parliament. Settlements with more than 10,000 people are eligible for city status, although the status is typically also granted to settlements of historical or regional importance. Cities are the highest ranking category of populated places in Ukraine's settlement hierarchy.

Prior to 2020, four cities in the oblast were designated as cities of regional significance (municipalities), which had self-government under city councils, while the oblast's remaining 14 cities were located amongst the oblast's 17 raions (districts) as cities of district significance, which are subordinated to the governments of the raions. On 18 July 2020, an administrative reform abolished and merged the oblast's raions and cities of regional significance into three new, expanded raions. The three raions that now make up the oblast are Chortkiv, Kremenets, and Ternopil.

As of 5 December 2001, the date of the first and only official census (Note: As of 11 July 2023) in the country since independence, the most populous city in the oblast was the regional capital, Ternopil, with a population of 227,755 people, while the least populous city was Pidhaitsi, with 3,280 people.

== List of cities ==
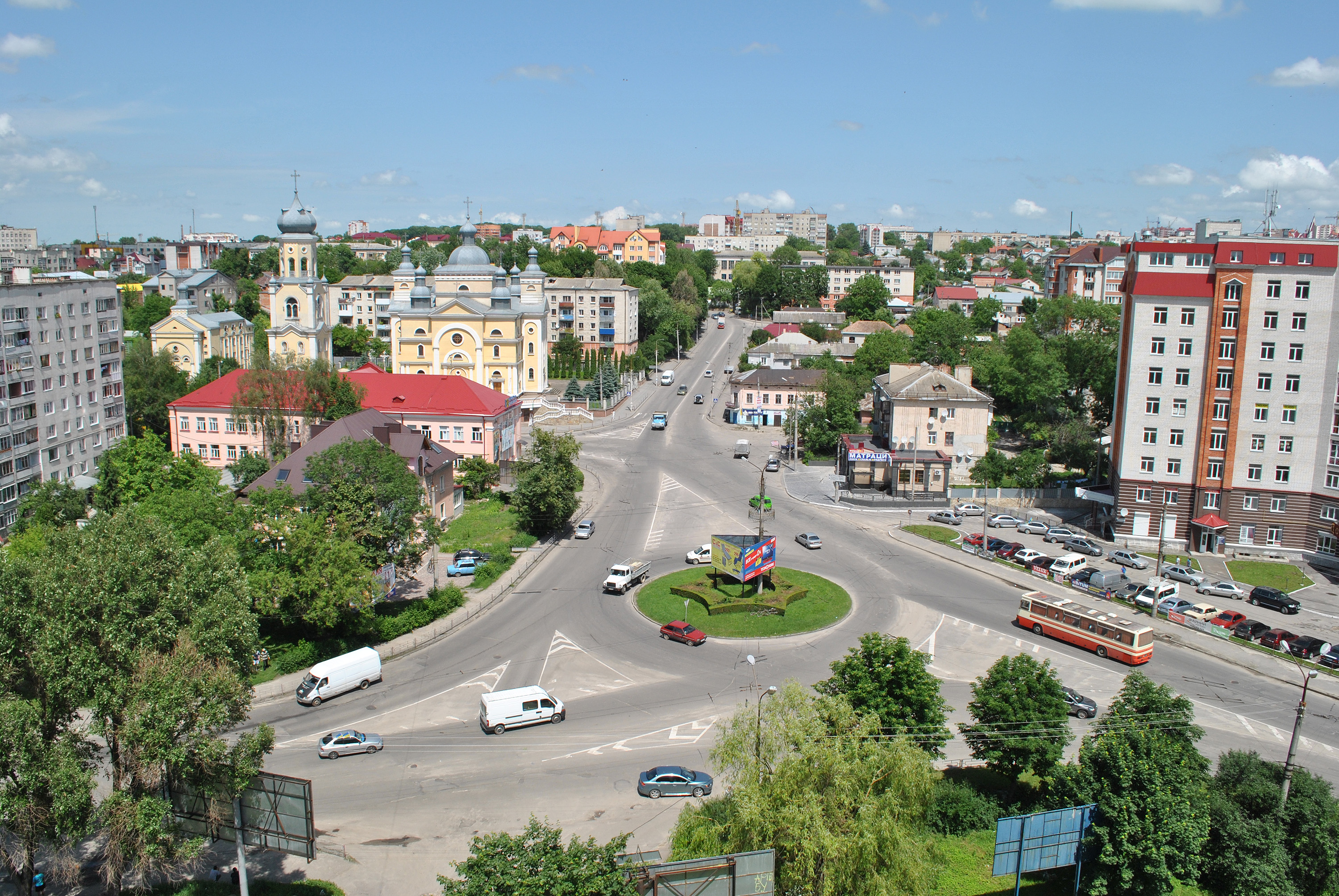
Ternopil, capital and most populous city in Ternopil Oblast

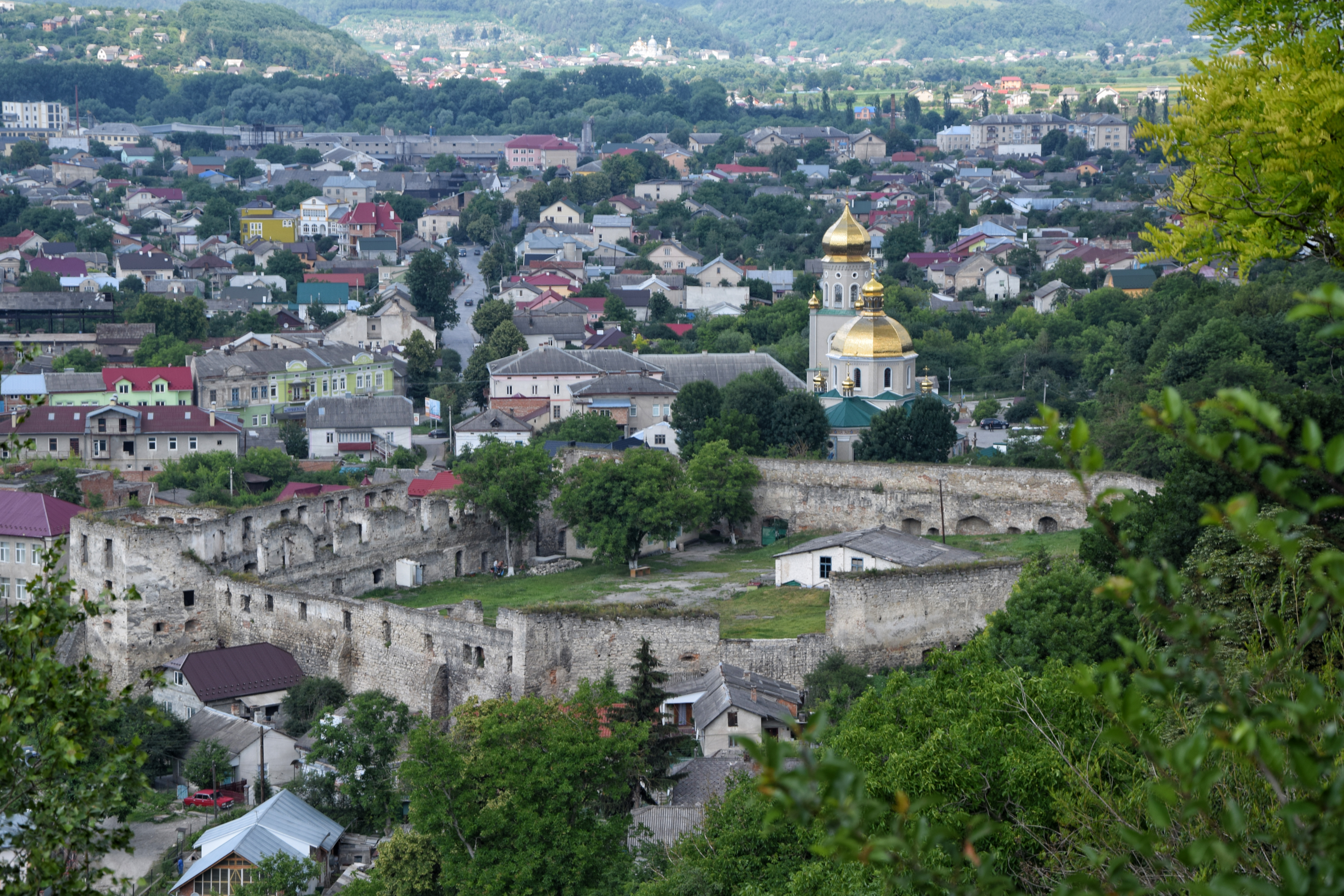
Chortkiv, second most populous city in the oblast

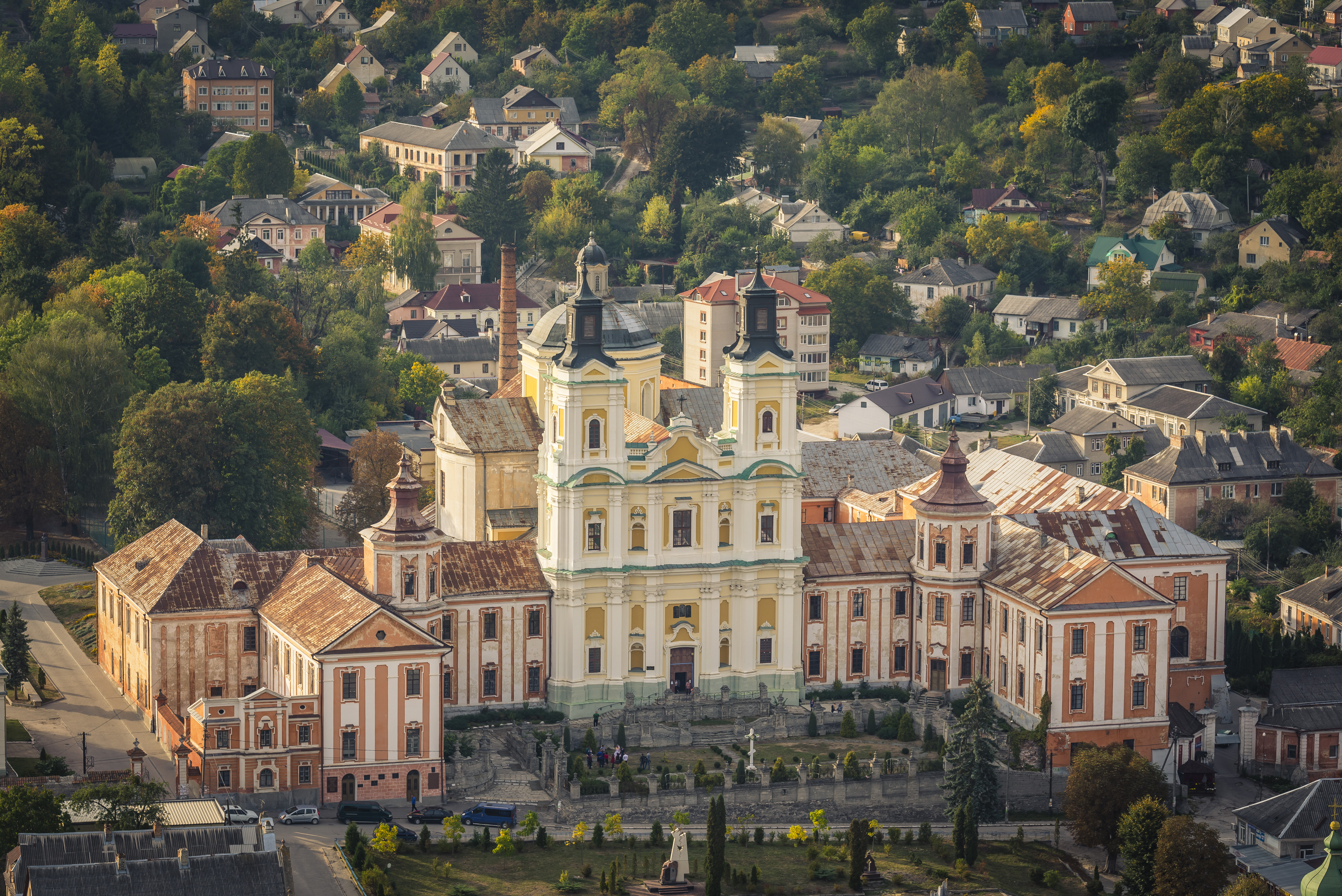
Kremenets, the oblast's third most populous city

Cities in Ternopil Oblast
Name	Name (in Ukrainian) (Note: Links to the Ukrainian Wikipedia articles for each city)	Raion (district)	Population (2022 estimates)	Population (2001 census)	Population change
Berezhany	Бережани	Ternopil	17,139	17,617	−2.71%
Borshchiv	Борщів	Chortkiv	10,632	11,382	−6.59%
Buchach	Бучач	Chortkiv	12,171	12,549	−3.01%
Chortkiv	Чортків	Chortkiv	28,279	29,057	−2.68%
Khorostkiv	Хоростків	Chortkiv	6,652	7,306	−8.95%
Kopychyntsi	Копичинці	Chortkiv	6,502	7,036	−7.59%
Kremenets	Кременець	Kremenets	20,476	22,051	−7.14%
Lanivtsi	Ланівці	Kremenets	8,215	8,680	−5.36%
Monastyryska	Монастириська	Chortkiv	5,380	6,344	−15.20%
Pidhaitsi	Підгайці	Ternopil	2,609	3,280	−20.46%
Pochaiv	Почаїв	Kremenets	7,633	8,240	−7.37%
Shumsk	Шумськ	Kremenets	5,300	5,161	+2.69%
Skalat	Скалат	Ternopil	3,739	4,036	−7.36%
Terebovlia	Теребовля	Ternopil	13,226	13,661	−3.18%
Ternopil	Тернопіль	Ternopil	225,004	227,755	−1.21%
Zalishchyky	Заліщики	Chortkiv	8,928	10,125	−11.82%
Zbarazh	Збараж	Ternopil	13,346	13,228	+0.89%
Zboriv	Зборів	Ternopil	6,621	7,436	−10.96%

== See also ==
- List of cities in Ukraine
