= Cimetière des Champeaux de Montmorency =

Cemetery in Val-d'Oise, France

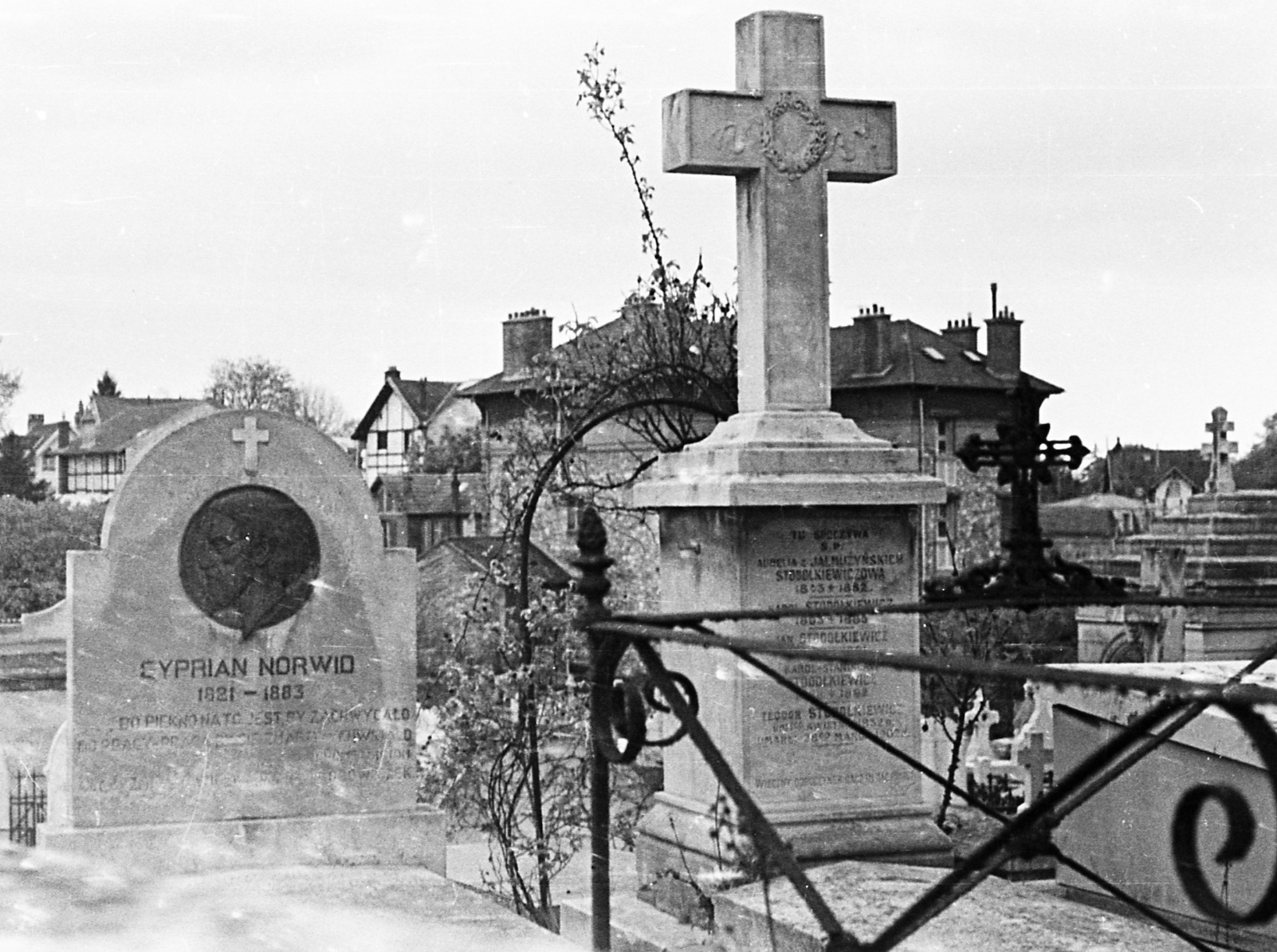
- Cyprian Norwid grave at Champeaux cemetery

Details
- Established: early 1600s
- Location: Montmorency, Val-d'Oise
- Country: France
- Coordinates: 48°59′38″N 2°19′25″E
- Type: Public, Roman Catholic

The Cimetière des Champeaux de Montmorency, at Montmorency, Val-d'Oise in Île-de-France, is a cemetery first established in the 17th century. It has the particularity of being the largest Polish burial place in France, hence its appellation as the "Pantheon of the Polish Emigration". It is located 15 km north of Paris and adjacent to the spa resort of Enghien-les-Bains. That it fell to Montmorency to become the main necropolis of the Polish diaspora in the country is due to two Polish political exiles, who happened to be staying at the nearby spa at the time of their death and were buried in the local cemetery. They were the statesman and poet, Julian Ursyn Niemcewicz, one time Polish envoy to the United Kingdom and Karol Kniaziewicz, politician and brigadier general in Napoleon's Grande Armée. Since their interments in the early part of the 19th century, a succession of noted exiled Poles found their final resting place in the cemetery. There are over 276 Polish burials, among them the poets Adam Mickiewicz, the national bard, and Cyprian Kamil Norwid, statesman Adam Jerzy Czartoryski, and the diplomat and head of the Polish resistance in France during WWII, Aleksander Kawalkowski. The cemetery has become one of the national symbols of Polish resistance to all forms of oppression, and each Spring, it is the rallying place for Poles living in the Paris area, who go there to commemorate their historical leaders and artists.

== History ==
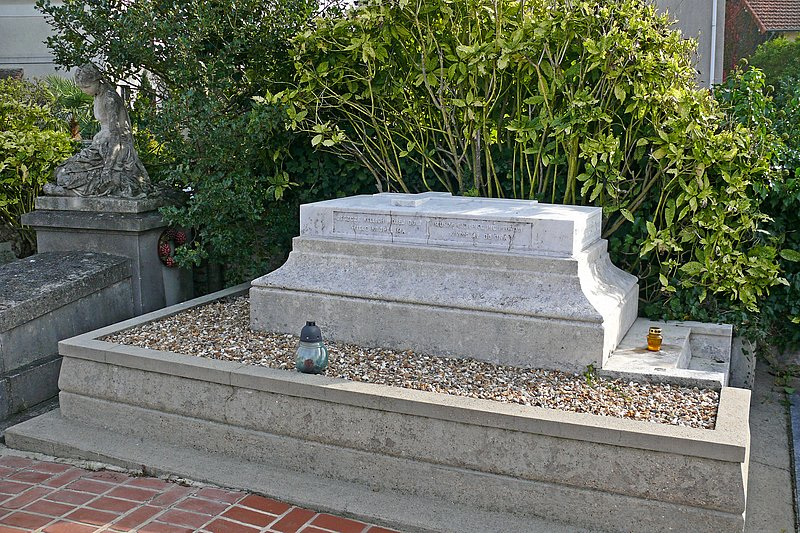
Tomb of Delfina Potocka (1807–1877), friend of Frederic Chopin

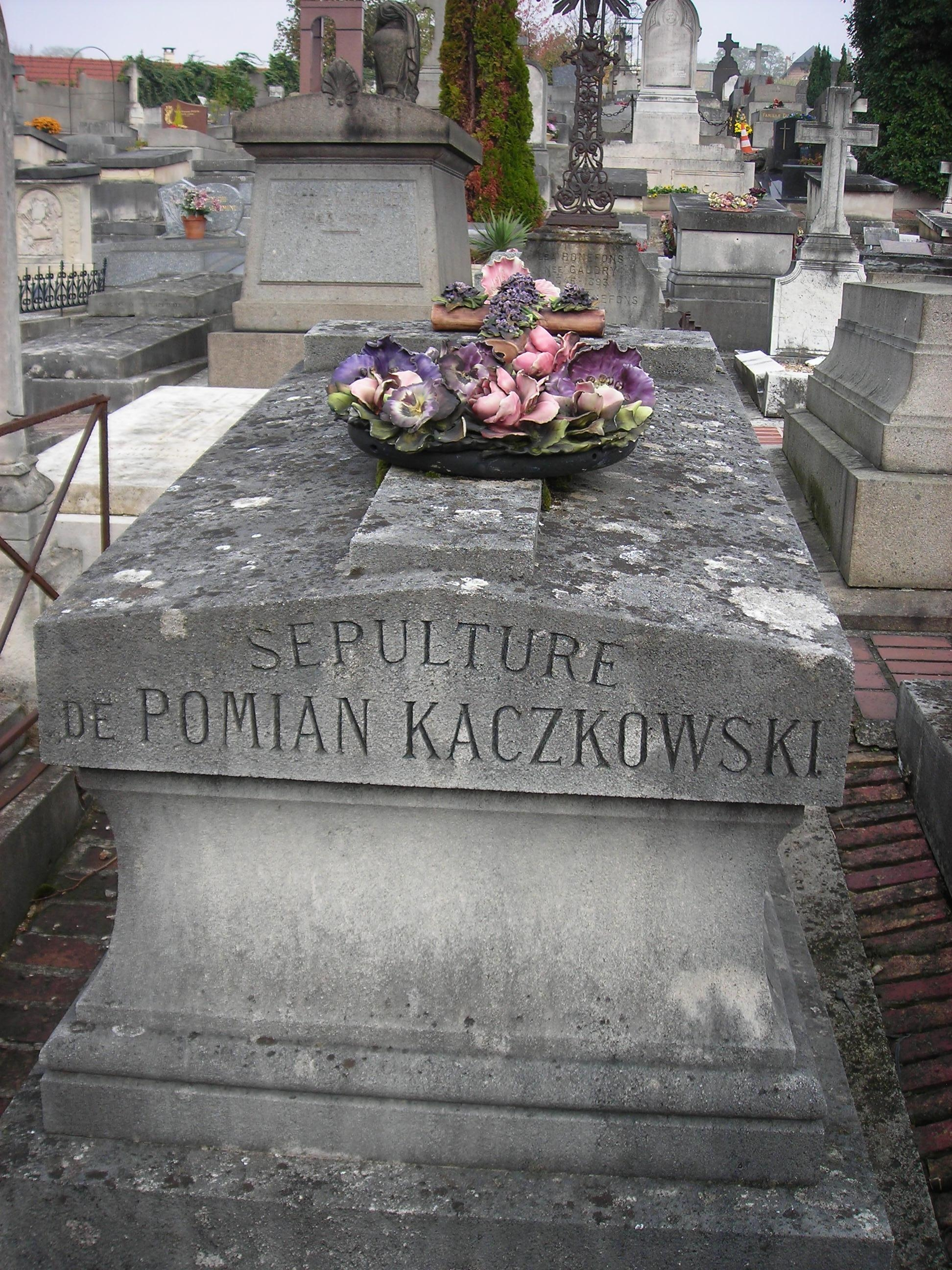
Tomb of writer Zygmunt Kaczkowski

=== Montmorency and the Grande Émigration ===
At the end of the 18th century, the Commonwealth of Poland-Lithuania ceased to be a sovereign state. It was partitioned in three stages between three neighbouring empires, the Russian Empire, Prussia and Austria-Hungary. While during Napoleon's passage to Russia a statelet attached to the First French Empire, called the Duchy of Warsaw, was briefly in existence, the Congress of Vienna turned it in 1815 into Congress Poland. It was a notionally semi-autonomous province and a fraction of the previous autonomous state, such that it was a monarchy in personal union with the Russian empire and the tsar was known as "King of Poland". However, the tyranny of tsar Nicholas I incited the Poles to stage a planned insurrection which began in November 1830, formed an interim Polish government under prince Czartoryski, and spread to all parts of the former Commonwealth under Russian rule well into the following year. It was brutally put down by Russia, resulting in thousands of deaths, imprisonment, confiscation of property and exile to Siberia. Many of the dissidents who managed to evade those outcomes, escaped to Western Europe, including the Italian and German states, Switzerland and the United Kingdom, with a majority settling in France where they were dubbed the Grande Emigration, with Czartoryski among them.

While in the 19th-century resettled Poles conducted their political and intellectual lives in Paris, they favoured Enghien-les-Bains as a holiday destination and Delfina Potocka opened a second salon at the spa to entertain guests to Chopin's piano recitals and hear the works of poets such as Juliusz Słowacki and Zygmunt Krasiński.

=== Wall of Remembrance ===
The cemetery is a place of remembrance for the Polish nation, of liberty and of the right to self-determination.

The Wall of Remembrance honours the memory of the Polish Armed Forces in the West and the Katyn massacre, the Massacres of Poles in Volhynia and Eastern Galicia (1943–1945), during World War II, and of the dissident union Solidarność (1980s). The history of the cemetery became synonymous with the history of Poland during the 20th century. It has received the bodies of insurgents and of deportees. Soil from Katyn has been deposited there. In the 1960s, the cemetery became a place of resistance to Communist Poland. People who declined to return to Poland while under occupation or under martial law chose to be buried there.

== Some notable burials ==
- Joseph Babinski (1857–1952), neurologist
- Bolesław Biegas (1877–1954), painter and sculptor
- Olga Boznańska (1865–1940), painter
- Aleksander Chodźko (1804–1891), orientalist, writer
- Adam Jerzy Czartoryski, (1770–1861), statesman
- Henryk Dembiński (1791–1864), general
- Janusz Gąsiorowski (1889-1949), brigadier general
- Cyprien Godebski (1835–1909), sculptor
- Antoni Gorecki (1787–1861), poet
- Aleksander Jełowicki (1804–1877), insurgent, editor, poet, priest
- Teodor Jełowicki (1828–1905), politician, musician, philanthropist
- Zygmunt Kaczkowski (1825–1896), poet
- Marya Kasterska (1893–1969), writer, journalist
- Aleksander Kawałkowski (1899–1965), officer and diplomat
- Karol Kniaziewicz (1762–1842), general, politician
- Tadeusz Makowski (1882–1932), painter
- Ludwik Mękarski (1843–1923), engineer
- Adam Mickiewicz (1798–1855), poet and writer (repatriated to Wawel Castle in 1890)
- Julian Ursyn Niemcewicz (1757–1841), statesman and poet
- Antoni Oleszczyński (1774–1879), painter
- Cyprian Kamil Norwid (1821–1883), artist, poet dramatist
- Władysław Oleszczyński (1807–1866), sculptor
- Bronisław Piłsudski (1866–1918), anthropologist, ethnographer
- Helena Paderewska (1856–1934), social activist, wife of Ignacy Paderewski
- Roman Palester (1907–1989), musical composer
- Edward Pożerski-Pomian (1875–1964), medical researcher
- Kazimierz Sosnkowski (1885–1969), general, politician
- Aleksander Wat (1900–1967), writer
- Władysław Zamoyski (1803–1868), general, Crimean War veteran, politician

== See also ==
- Poles in France
- Brompton Cemetery
