= Brama coat of arms =

Polish coat of arms

- Alternative name: Oginiec
- Earliest mention: unknown
- Towns: none
- Families: Andruszewicz, Bożeniec-Jełowicki, Chawejłowicz, Fiedorowicz, Hryniewski, Kontrymowicz, Ogiński, Puzyna

Brama is a Polish coat of arms. It was used by several szlachta families during the Polish–Lithuanian Commonwealth.

== Notable bearers ==
Several families have borne this coat of arms, which were listed at Herbarza polskiego ("Polish Coat of Arms") by Tadeusz Gajl, who listed a total of 7 surnames. The most notable were:

- Edward Jełowicki, officer, engineer and inventor
- Aleksander Jełowicki, insurgent, poet, editor, writer and priest

== Puzyna coat of arms (Brama odm. Puzyna) ==
Puzyna. Notable bearers of this coat of arms include:

- Prince Jan Maurycy Paweł Cardinal Puzyna de Kosielsko

== See also ==
- Polish heraldry
- Heraldry
- Coat of arms
