= Church of Saint Thaddaeus, Luchay =

Church in Luchay, Belarus

Coordinates: 55°5′23″N 27°7′4″E

Church of Saint Thaddaeus in Luchay
- Касьцёл Сьвятога Тадэвуша
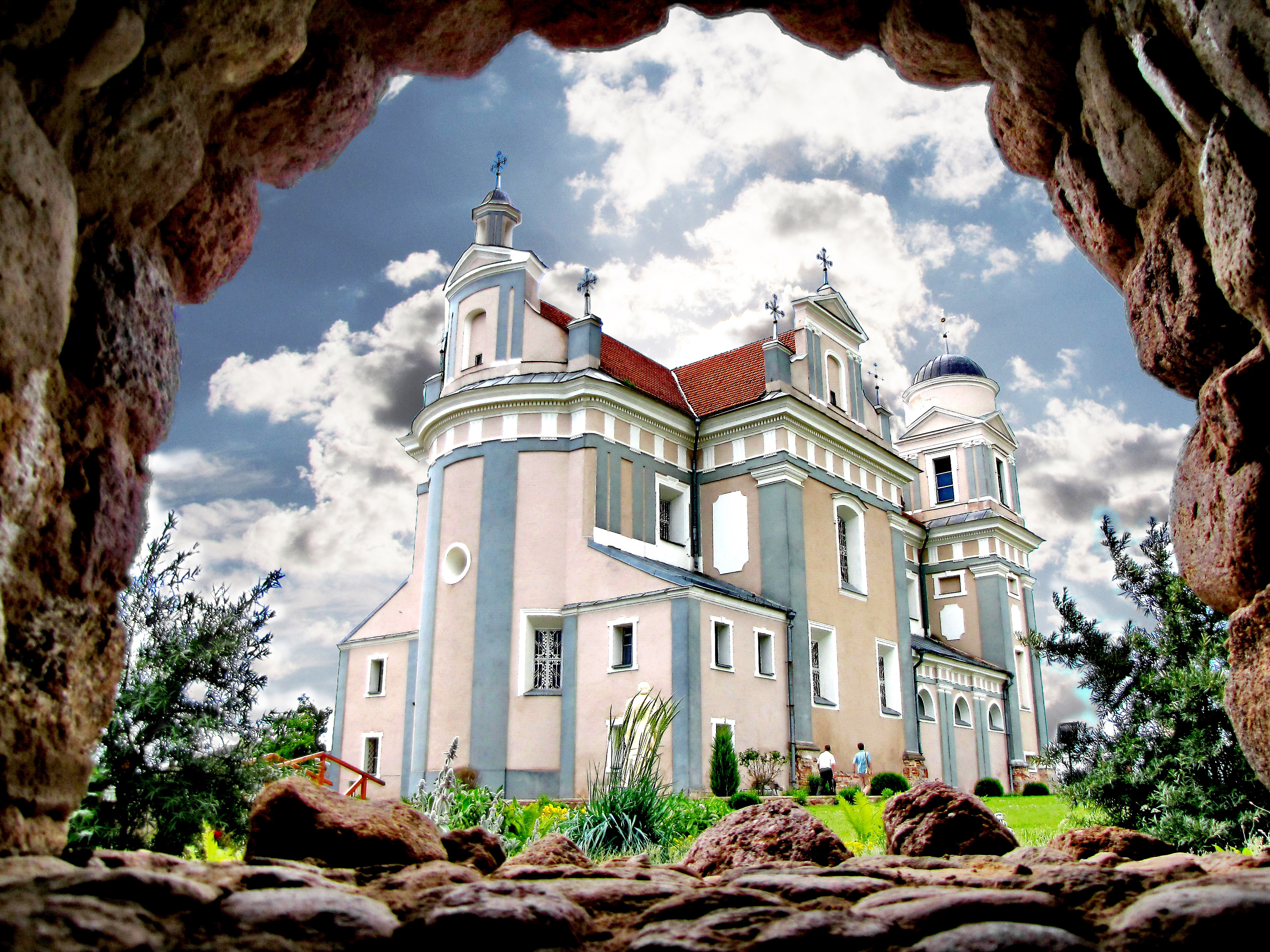
- Church of Saint Thaddaeus in Luchay
- Location: Luchay
- Country: Belarus
- Denomination: Roman Catholic church

Architecture
- Style: Baroque, Classicism
- Years built: 1766–1776

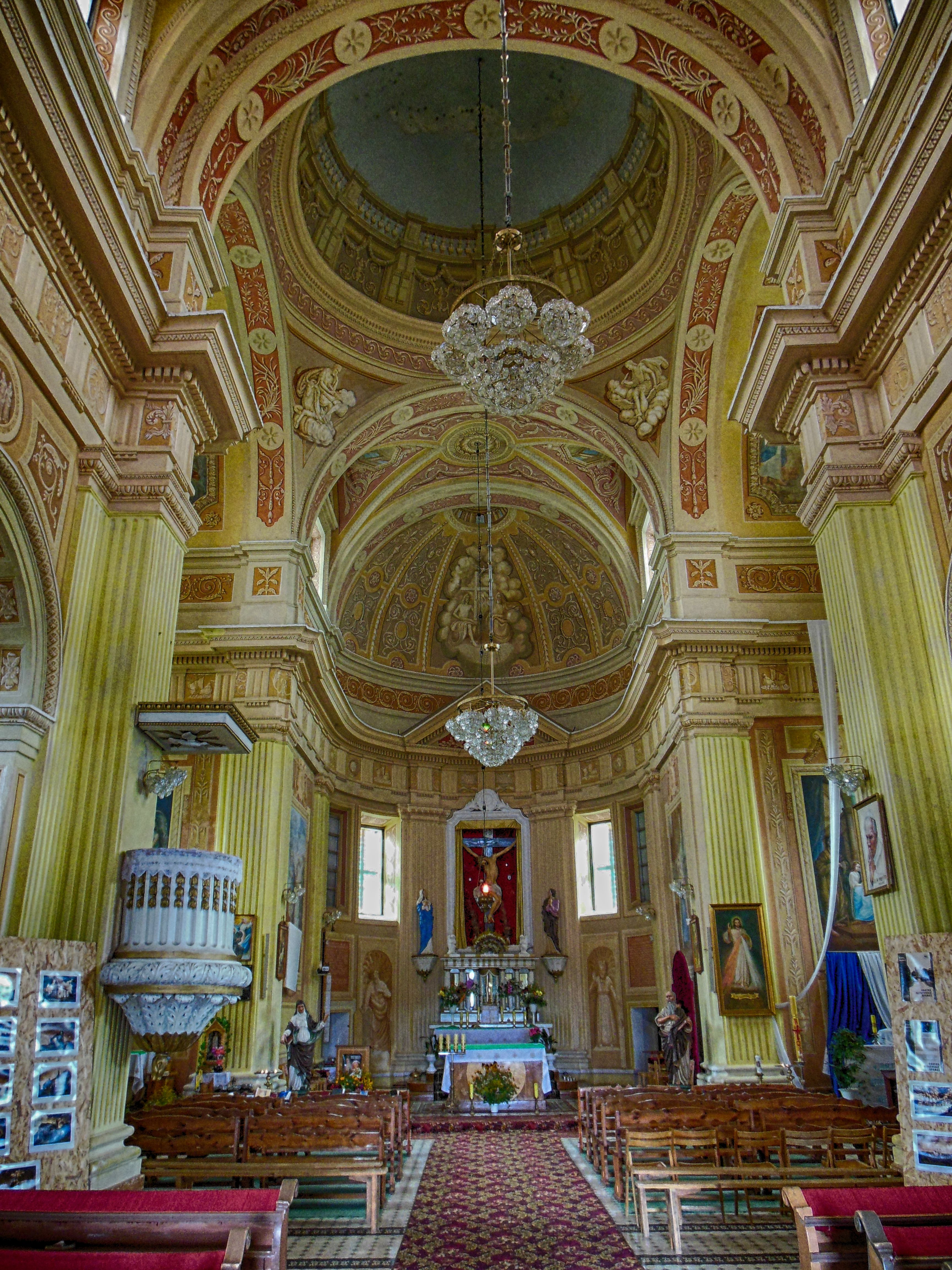
The interior, 2012

Church of Saint Thaddaeus in Luchay is a Roman Catholic church in Vitebsk Region, Belarus. Built in 1766–1776, it is included into the national historic heritage list.

== History ==
In 1731, the Main School of Vilnius established a mission in Luchay. At first, all buildings were wooden. In 1766, Prince Michał Kazimierz Ogiński and Prince Tadeusz Franciszek Ogiński donated money to build a church in the town. The church was consecrated on September 4, 1774, and completely constructed by 1776. In 1779, the local Jesuits order was dismissed, and the church's funds were transferred under management of the Commission of National Education.

In 1811, the Governor of Minsk donated money to buy and install the pipe organ in the church.

The church was severely damaged during the World War II, in Soviet times it was closed in 1948 by the authorities and used as a warehouse. On May 16, 1990, the church was returned to the parish and reopened.
