= Teodor Jełowicki =

Polish landowner

Teodor Bożeniec Jełowicki
- Born: 9 November 1828; Sinica, Kiev Governorate, Russian Empire
- Died: 29 November 1905 (aged 77); Paris, France
- Burial place: Cimetière des Champeaux de Montmorency, Montmorency, Val-d'Oise
- Occupations: land management, musician and philanthropist
- Known for: Public administration, friendship with exiled artists
- Family: Jełowicki family

Jełowicki family crest

Teodor Adam-Michał Jełowicki (9 November 1828 - 1905) was a Polish landowner of princely Ruthenian descent, secretary general of the Kyiv council, Marshal of the Uman Powiat, musician, diarist, prisoner, exile in Paris and philanthropist.

== Early years ==
He was born in Sinica in the Kiev Governorate, on his father Stefan Jełowicki's estate. His father was marshal of the Kremenetsky Uyezd of Volhynia Governorate and married to Antonina née Iwaszkiewicz. Jełowicki completed his secondary education at the Lycée Richelieu in Odessa, where he also took piano lessons from M.Czerny. He took a law degree at the National University of Kyiv. Throughout his studies he was a friend of August Iwański, a participant in the January Uprising of 1863, exile and amateur musician.

In 1857 he paid his mother, Antonina, the sum of 10,000 silver rubles as a fee to acquire her share in his father's estate. In that year he had built a church in Łanowce, after the original timber structure, erected by the widow of Christopher Jełowicki and their son Elias, had burned down in 1839. The new church in empire style was consecrated by bishop Kacper Borowski in 1860. Later that year Jełowicki was appointed marshal of Uman. He performed the role in the difficult time leading to the uprising and in the midst of the abolition of serfdom in Poland. He was regarded by his friend, Iwański, as: "not a man of initiative, but one who adjusted to prevailing trends".

== January uprising ==
Although not directly involved in the military uprising, he secretly supported it financially, which led to his imprisonment, along with other marshals, in the Kyiv Fortress. Despite there being no proof of his involvement in the insurgency, suspicions harboured by the tsarist authorities forced him to sell his properties in Volhynia and in Ukraine, including Łanowce, Oryszkowce, Noworoczyca and his own birthplace in Sinica near Uman. The auction was enforced in 1868 by a statutory order of the Tsar, dated 10 December 1865. Thus Łanowiec, first conferred on Paszko Jełowicki by the king, in 1444, and whose continuity passed from father to son since, was sequestered from the family and became the property of loyal government official, Baron Korff.

=== In exile ===
As a result, he emigrated to Paris. There he resumed his musical studies with Julian Fontana, a friend of Chopin. Jełowicki sponsored other musicians and artists of the diaspora. He also gave financial support to the Polish Catholic Mission in Paris, the St. Kazimierz charitable institution, where he sat on the committee and to the Polish Library in Paris.

In the autumn of 1871 he made a trip to Lwów with the aim of buying an estate in Podolia, but soon returned to France, having thought better of it. In 1873 he joined the Historical and Literary Society, where his literary cousin Aleksander Jełowicki was already a member. He befriended the poet Cyprian Norwid whom he supported materially during his stay at the St. Kazimierz hostel. As a token of his gratitude, the destitute Norwid, gave him an album of his own sketches and water colours. When the poet died, Teodor Jełowicki paid the 400 francs for his funeral.

== Death ==
Jełowicki died suddenly in Paris, intestate, on November 9, 1905, and was buried at the Cimetière des Champeaux de Montmorency. He left a diary covering forty years (1865–1905). It contained his photographs and sketches by Norwid, along with musical compositions by Chopin, Julian Fontana and composer, Wojciech Sowiński. Part of his rich correspondence went up in flames in the 1944 Warsaw Uprising. His estate went to his sister, Stefania's granddaughter, Maria, (née Złotnicka) and Maria's husband, Władysław Jaroszyński.

== Bibliography ==
- F. German Polish Biographical Dictionary. XI, 165–166.
- A letter by Teodor Jełowicki in the Dzieduszycki family archive, at Kórnik Castle
