= Jałowicze =

Village in Rivne Oblast, Ukraine

Jałowicze Яловичі
- village
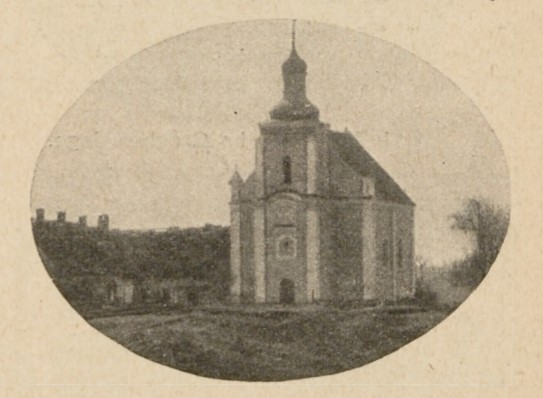
- Catholic church in Яловичі, (Jałowicze), Volhynia, Ukraine
- Interactive map of Jałowicze
- Coordinates: 50°38′58″N 25°23′24″E
- Country: Ukraine
- Region: Rivne Oblast
- Seat: Mlyniv

Population (2020)
  - Total: 202
- Time zone: UTC+02:00 (EET)
  - Summer (DST): UTC+03:00 (EEST)
- Area code: +380
- Website: http://www.rv.gov.ua/sitenew/mlynivsk Mlyniv Raion

Jałowicze, (uk: Яловичі, pl: Jełowicze) is a village in Volhynia, Western Ukraine in the Dubno Raion, Rivne Oblast. It lies 15 km south east of Lutsk, on the right bank of the Styr river.

== History ==
The village's origins were as a Ruthenian settlement within the Grand Duchy of Lithuania. Jełowicze together with the neighbouring hamlet of Bożeniec, belonged through the 14th and 15th-centuries to the Ruthenian Jełowicki family, whose name dates from the 14th-century and recalls their ownership of the domain. With the signing of the Union of Lublin in 1569, it became part of the Lithuanian-Polish commonwealth. The village baroque church built in 1669, was founded by a Lutsk judge, Samuel Dołmat Isajkowski for the Dominican Order. Following the Partitions of the Polish Lithuanian Commonwealth, the territory was occupied by the Russian Empire and the religious oder was suppressed, turning the abbey church into a parish church. After World War I Jałowicze became part of the Second Republic of Poland. The Soviet invasion of Poland, led to its incorporation into the Soviet Union.

== Notable features ==
- Jałowicze fortified castle was erected in the 14th-century. In the 17th century, the remnants of the castle were integrated in a Dominican abbey. Subsequently, fragments of the abbey walls became the priests house.
