= Kropotkin family =

Russian family

Princes Kropotkin Князья Кропоткины
- princely family, boyar scions
- Arms of Princes Kropotkin

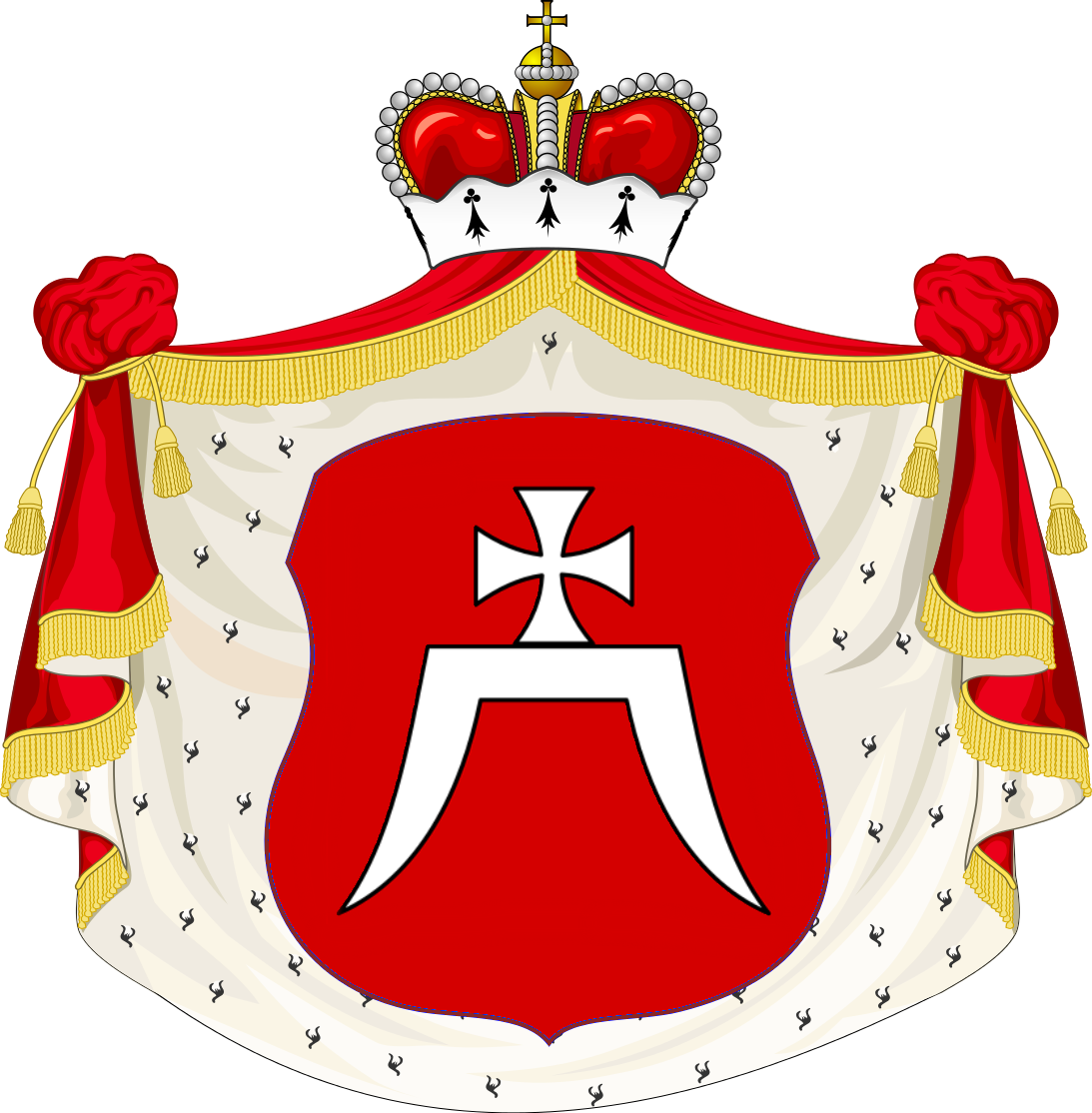
- Arms of Princes Kropotka-Jełowicki
- Parent family: Rurik dynasty
- Current region: Russia
- Origin: Principality of Smolensk
- Founded: 15th century
- Founder: Prince Dmitry Vasilyevich Kropotka
- Connected families: Kropotka-Jełowicki

The House of Kropotkin (Russian: Князья Кропоткины, romanized: Knyaz'ya Kropotkiny), an ancient Russian noble family of Rurik stock, descends from Prince Dmitry Vasilyevich (1400-1470, nicknamed Kropotka), traditionally a nephew of Yuri Svyatoslavich (died 1407, the last Grand Duke of Smolensk). Princes Kropotkin feature in the 5th part (titled nobility, Russian: титулованное дворянство) of the Velvet Book of genealogies for Kazan, Kaluga, Mogilyov, Moscow, Ryazan, Saint-Petersburg and Tula; and in the second part (military nobility) of the Moscow nobles' genealogical book.

== History ==
In the 15th-early 16th centuries, Princes Kropotkin were vassals of the Grand Duke of Lithuania. In 1496 Prince Ivan Dmitrievich Kropotkin (d. 1502) received the village of Jelowiczi in Lutsk Powiat, but around the beginning of the 16th century he turned to the Muscovite side and died in the Russo-Lithuanian war of 1500 — 1503. His brother, Prince Alexander Dmitrievich Kropotkin (d. 1520), was the founder of the senior lineage. The son of Prince Ivan Dmitrievich Kropotkin, Vasily Kropotka-Jełowicki (d. circa 1542), was the founder of the Lithuanian branch. When his son, Prince Jakob Kropotka-Jełowicki died in 1564, this branch became extinct.

The family had owned lands in the regions of Veliky Novgorod and Ryazan since the 16th century. In the 16th century many Kropotkins served as boyar scions. The family was included in Ivan the Terrible's Book of One Thousand of 1550 listing 1000 best vassals from provincial nobility. Despite some Kropotkins reaching the rank of stolnik in the 17th century, none of them had ever been in the rank of boyar. Many family members were voivodes, commanders, courtiers and later generals. However, in the early 18th century, some of the Ryazanian branch had degraded to poor gentry and even odnodvortsy. For example, Prince Dmitry Timofeevich Kropotkin, an early 18th-century landlord of the Demidovo village, Ponitski stan, and a dragoon of the Senate company (Senatskaya rota), was statused as an odnodvorets, but his relations of the very same village, were counted as full nobility. Despite many other impoverished Rurikid families, the Kropotkins managed to maintain the princely title.

To the general public the family is mainly known for the famed Russian revolutionary Pyotr Kropotkin.

== Notable members ==
=== Descendants of Prince Alexander Dmitrievich Kropotkin (d. 1520) ===
- Prince Andrey Alexandrovich Kropotkin (d. circa 1524) was a voivode in the Livonian campaign of 1501, and the Muscovite campaign against Lithuania of 1515 and 1519; voivode at Syrensk in 1508, Topopets in 1521, and a vice-voivode during the Russo-Kazan war of 1523–1524.
- Prince Pyotr Ivanovich Kropotkin (d. 1630) was a participant at the Russo-Livonian war of 1558–1583, voivode at Kreutzburg (now Krustpils, Latvia) in 1579 and Sesswegen (now Cesvaine, Latvia) in 1582, and a participant of the Russo-Swedish war in 1590–1593; the voivode at Oreshek (1590–1592), Ladoga (1593–1594), and the 3rd voivode at Ivangorod (1602–1603).
- Prince Vasily Petrovich Kropotkin (1564–1648) took part in the campaign against Ivan Bolotnikov and False Dimitry II near Yelets (July–August 1606), Kaluga (December 1606–May 1607) and other battles of the Time of Troubles. He also was a voivode at Gorodetsko (now Bezhetsk) (1621–1622), Ladoga (1627–1628), and Uglich (1630–1632).
- Prince Alexander Vasilievich Kropotkin (d. 1659/60) was a stolnik and a voivode at Surgut (1650–53).
- Prince Vasily Vasilievich Kropotkin (d. 1691) was a stolnik (since 1649), a voivode at Voronezh (1651–1653); he participated in Vitebsk and Polotsk campaigns during the Russo-Polish war of 1654–1667 and in the Riga campaign during the Russo-Swedish war of 1656–1658. He also was a voivode at Ryazan (1661–1664) and took part in the suppression of Razin's revolt of 1670–1671; a voivode at Nizhny Novgorod (1687–1688).
- Prince Mikhail Vasilievich Kropotkin (1649–1718) was a chamberlain (komnatny stolnik) of Tsar Ivan V (1682), a stolnik of Tsarina Sofia of Russia, a poet, genealogist and translator. In 1682 he submitted documents to the Chamber of Genealogical Affairs to include his kin to the Velvet Book. Together with the Princes Dashkov he was an active opponent of including the Polev and Eropkin families to the descendants of Smolensk Rurikids, but his protests were not accepted. His son, Alexey Mikhailovich (d. 1747) was a navy officer, later an official at the Senate, a vice governor of Voronezh governorate (1746–1747).

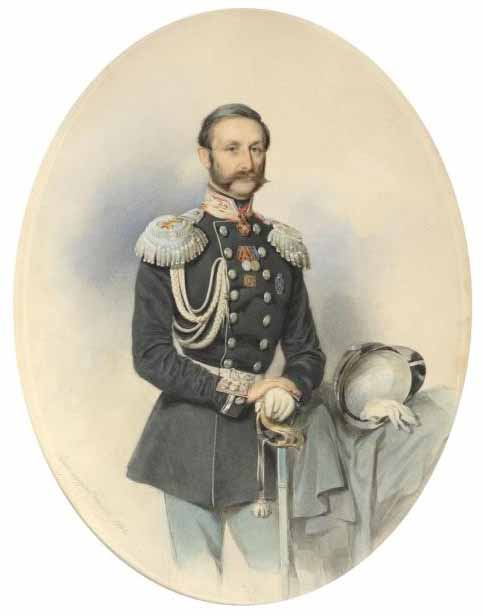
Prince Alexey Ivanovich Kropotkin (1806-1903)

Descendants of Prince Ivan Dmitrievich Kropotkin (d. 1520)

- Prince Vasily Ivanovich Kropotka-Jełowicki (d. circa 1542) was the founder of the Lithuanian princes Kropotka-Jełowicki.
- Prince Andrey Ivanovich Kropotkin (d. after 1558) was the founder of the junior Russian branch of Princes Kropotkin.
- Prince Dmitry Vasilyevich Kropotkin (d. 1574), grandson of Prince Andrey Ivanovich, was a participant in the Russo-Livonian war of 1558–1583, the second head (golova) of the Guard Corps (Storozhevoy polk) in Livonia (1558), the head of the Guard Corps in the Fellin campaign (now Viljandi, Estonia) in 1560, and the 1st voivode at Gaujiena (1567). He died in a battle with the Swedes.
- Prince Mikhail Ivanovich Kropotkin (d. after 1598) was participant of the Russo-Swedish war of 1590–1593, a voivode at Gdov (1590–1591) and Yama (1593–1594). His son, Prince Kuzma (Voin) Mikhailovich Kropotkin (d. after 1643) was a participant of campaigns against Ivan Bolotnikov and False Dmitry II. In 1625 he organized census (Pistovye knigi) of the landlords of Tula and Krapivna districts, in 1635–1643 he recorded landed estates of the Vladimir district.
- Prince Boris Mikhailovich Kropotkin was a Ryazanian landlord and is believed to be the founder of the Ryazanian branch of the family. However, Princes Kropotkin were recoded as owner of estate in Perevitsky stan earlier in the 16th century.
- Prince Semyon Nikitich Kropotkin (d. after 1609) was a participant of the Russo-Livonian war of 1558–1583 as the 1st voivode of the Great Corps in 1565, the Russo-Swedish war of 1590–1593, and a voivode at Ladoga (1590–1594). In 1602 he received the fiancé of Princess Xenia Godunova, Prince Johan of Schleswig-Holstein. He was a voivode in the campaign that cleared Krapivna and Odoyev off of Bolotnikov's troops. He owned the village of Semyonovskoe (Chepryuhino or Chudinovo) on the Glinushka river, in Perevitsky stan, in the second half of the 16th century, which he received from the Bishop of Ryazan.
- Prince Jakov Ivanovich Kropotkin was an active state councillor (since 1741), oberster kriegskommissar, the head of investigation service (sysknoy prikaz; since 1740).
- Prince Alexey Petrovich Kropotkin (1805–1871) was a major general (since 1855), participant of the Russo-Turkish war of 1828–1829, and the suppression of the Polish revolt of 1830–1831.
- Pyotr Alexeyvich Kropotkin (1842–1921) was a famed anarchist revolutionary and philosopher.
- Prince Pyotr Nikolaevich Kropotkin (1831–1903) was a lieutenant general (1901), participant of the suppression of the Polish revolt of 1863–1864, head of the 1st Hussar Sumsky corps (1867–1874); since 1874 he was a member of the Chief Committee for establishment organization of troops; in 1876–1881 he was the commander of the 5th Caucasus division.
- Prince Dmitry Nikolaevich Kropotkin (1836–1879) was a lieutenant general (1878), flügeladjutant (1861). Since 1863 he was a member of the Imperial retinue. In 1868–1870 he was the governor of Grodno governorate and in 1870–1879 of the Kharkov governorate, actively fighting any anti-tsar movement. He was shot by G.D. Goldenberg from Narodnaya Volya.
- Prince Nikolay Dmitrievich Kropotkin (1872–1937) was an active state councillor (1913), master of ceremonies (1910), vice-governor of Courland (1907–1912) and (1912–15) and Livonia. Since 1898 he owned Segewold mansion (now in Sigulda, Latvia). In 1917 he emigrated to Germany.
- Alexey Petrovich Kropotkin (b. 13-11-1937) is a Russian scientist, a professor in physics.
- Prince Alexey Ivanovich Kropotkin (1816–1903), lieutenant general (1873), a participant of the Hungary campaign of 1849, Crimean war of 1853-56, flügeladjutant (1853), major general of the Imperial retinue(1858), Moscow oberpolicmeister (1858–1860), marshal of Luzhsk nobility (1897–1900).
- Vladimir Vsevolodovich Kropotkin (1922–1993) was a Soviet archeologist, and the head of the Scytho-Sarmatian department of the Institute of Archeology at the Soviet Academy of Sciences.
- Princess Alexandra Kropotkin (1887–1966), writer and émigré to the United States

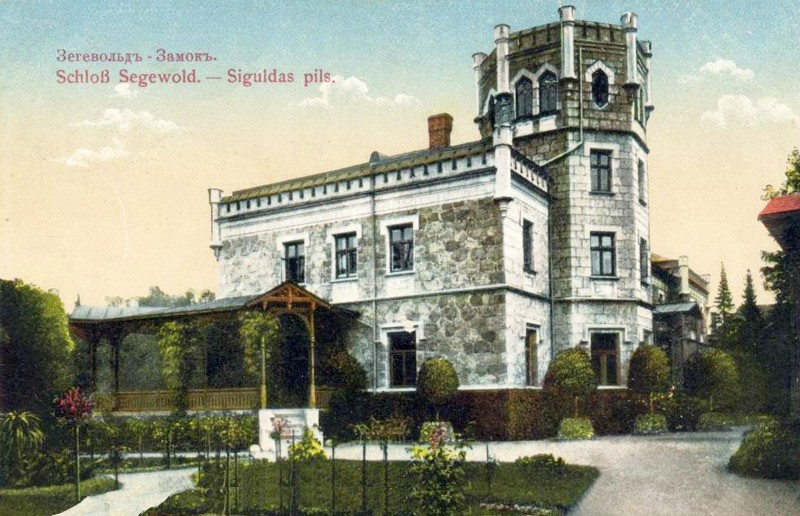
Kropotkins' mansion Segewold, Latvia

== Estates ==
- Zymyonki (Ziminki), Perevitski stan (now Zaraysky district, Moscow Oblast), Ryazan uyezd.
- Stroilovo, Perevitsky stan, Ryazan uyezd.
- Klin on Molevo bog, Perevitsky stan, Ryazan uyezd.
- Gorenosovo on the Mecha river, Perevitsky stan.
- Semyonosvkoe (Chepryukhino, Chudinovo), Perevitski stan.
- Sleptsovo, Perevitski stan.
- Demidovo, Ponitsky stan, Ryazan uyezd.
- Oblovo, Ponitski stan, Ryazan uyezd.
- Segewold (Sigulda) mansion, Latvia.
- Urusovo, Chaplyginski district, Lipetsk Oblast.

== See also ==
- Peter Kropotkin
- Rurik dynasty
- Jełowicki family
