= Ozhenyn =

Village in Rivne Oblast, Ukraine

Ozhenyn Оженин
- village
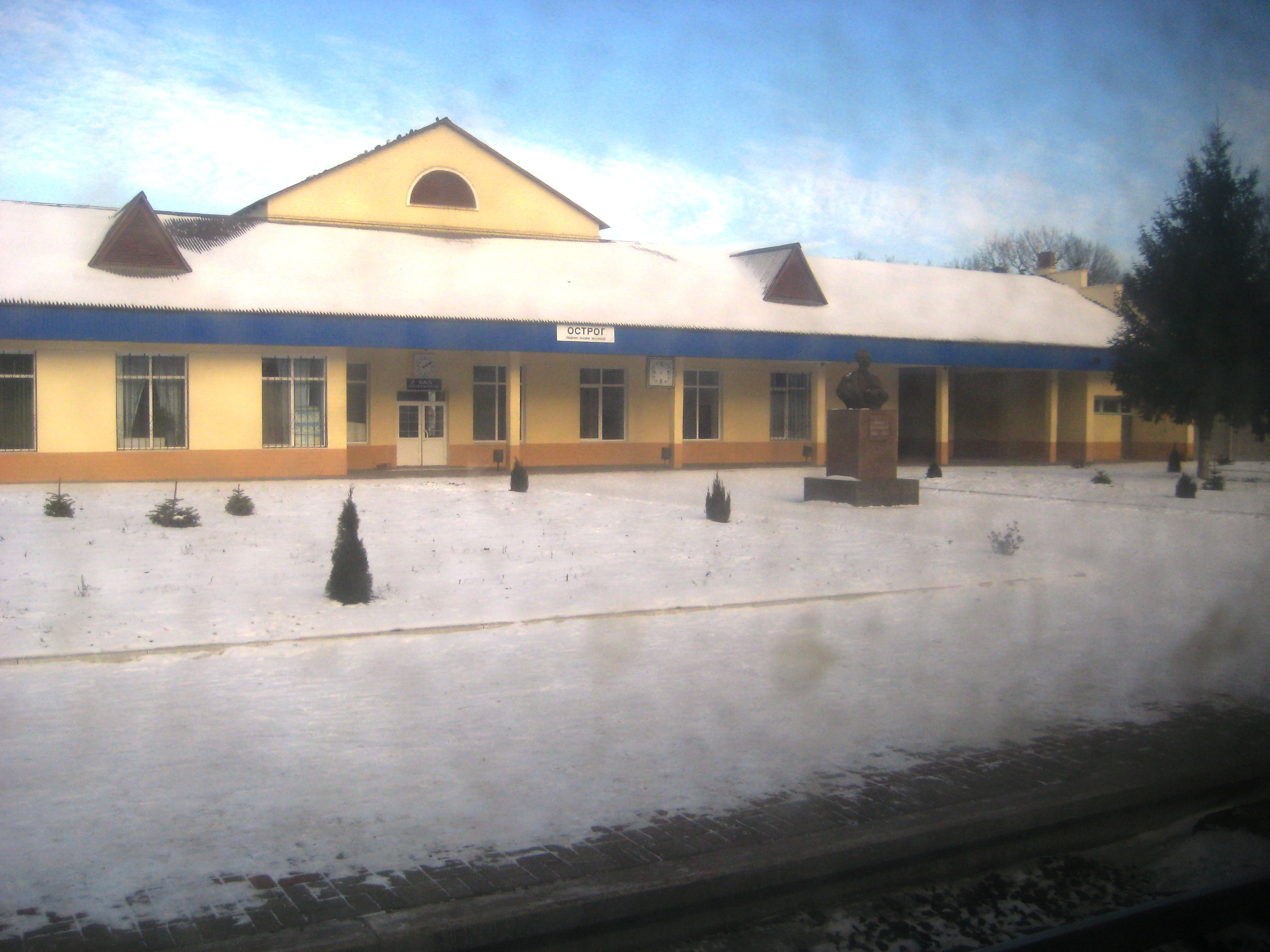
- Ostroh Railway station in Оженин, Rivne Oblast

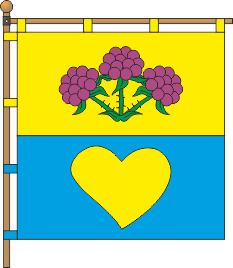
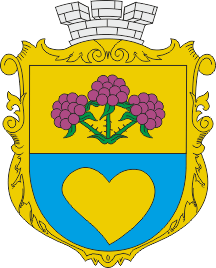
- Flag Coat of arms
- Interactive map of Ozhenyn
- Coordinates: 50°26′31″N 26°28′59″E
- Country: Ukraine
- Region: Rivne Oblast
- Seat: Ostroh

Population (2001)
  - Total: 4,777
- Time zone: UTC+02:00 (EET)
  - Summer (DST): UTC+03:00 (EEST)

Ozhenyn, (uk: Оженин, pl: Ożenin), is a village in Ukraine in the Ostroh Raion, Rivne Oblast. It is the site of Ostroh railway station, on the Kovel – Koziatyn line. Until the 1930s it was called "Ożenin". The city of Ostroh is 14km distant from the station.

== Landmarks ==
- Mansion and estate – Until the end of the 19th century, there was an ancient manor house owned by the Jełowicki family, in whose possession it had been for seven generations. It was set amidst opulent parkland featuring an avenue of centenarian linden trees. In 1927 Witold Jełowicki, jurist and judge, died on his Ożenin estate.

== Notable people ==
- Antonina Niemiryczowa née Jełowicka (1702–1780), Polish baroque poet and translator, was born on the Ożenin family estate

== Bibliography ==
- Фотолинии
- Фотолинии
