= Antonina Niemiryczowa =

Polish poet

- Born: Maria Antonina Bożeniec Jełowicka c. 1700; Ożenin Ostróg Kingdom of Poland and the Grand Duchy of Lithuania
- Died: c.1780 Lwów, Poland,
- Occupations: poet, translator
- Spouse: Karol Józef Niemirycz
- Children: Fryderyk, Bonawentura
- Writing career
- Pen name: A.Z.I.N.L.O.
- Genres: baroque poetry translations from the French of Jean Préchac and others
- Notable work: Wiersze Polskie

Jełowicki crest

Antonina Niemiryczowa or Niemierzycowa, née Bożeniec Jełowicka (pseud. A.Z.I.N.L.O: Antonina Z Iełowickich Niemiryczowa Litewska Oboźna, tr. Antonina née Iełowicka Niemiryczowa Lithuanian Camp dweller c.1702 in Ożenin, Ostróg - c.1780 in Lwów), a Polish Enlightenment noblewoman poet and translator. Along with Franciszka Urszula Radziwiłłowa and Elżbieta Drużbacka, she is considered a leading Polish poet of the age.

== Life ==
=== Early years ===
Born into an ancient Ruthenian-Polish ducal family on her father's estate in Koleśniki, Ożenin near Ostróg, she was one of three children, the daughter of Józef Jełowicki (1667–1708), Court Swordbearer, promoted to Master of the hunt for Volhynia. Her mother was Konstancja née Zorzewska (or Zarzecka), formerly, Samuelowa Kałusowska. Her paternal grandmother who was Zofia Hieronimowa Jełowicka, née Kurdwanowska, left her granddaughter a "tidy sum" in 1704. She was tutored at home by an enlightened governor, possibly a Frenchman, brought in from Warsaw, originally to coach her older brother, Franciszek (b. 1699) who would later become a starosta in Nowosielsk. Her education was completed in the Bernardine convent in Lwów. She acquired fluent French and a thorough knowledge of the literature of France, the German speaking lands and of Italy. She was schooled in musical composition and in fine art.

=== Marriage and status ===
In 1719 she married a wealthy landowner, Karol Józef Niemirycz, in Koleśniki. By 1724 her brother had settled a 30.000 zpn (złotych polskich) dowry on the groom. She went to live with her husband in Czerniechów in Owrucz. In the 1730s they moved to Zołotyjów near Równe. The couple managed large estates which grew larger following the purchase of Horoszki in the Zhytomyr powiat in 1749 and the deaths of the Niemirycz brothers. By 1749 they owned the township of Derezna in the Ostroga Ordynacja. The couple also owned a modern library of the time and shared a love of literature. Already in 1750 Antonina was a noted poet who had won the approval of luminaries including, Józef Aleksander Jabłonowski, Józef Andrzej Załuski and Jan Daniel Janocki, for the clarity and charm of her Polish language. She maintained a correspondence with Franciszka Urszula Radziwiłłowa despite their differing tastes, the latter being more in favour of French Classicism, while Antonina preferred the Rococo style in all matters of art, in the manner of Elżbieta Drużbacka. She also had the reputation of a demanding critic of the poetic art.

=== Philanthropy ===
The couple shared half their revenues, at Antonina's instigation, with the Lwów Roman Catholic Cathedral, where their son, Fryderyk was a canon. They were involved in several court and tribunal proceedings in an effort to restore their reputation due to their alleged political defiance connected to the election of the Polish king. In another civil case they settled with their workers after a peasant revolt.

=== Later years ===
Karol Niemirycz died in 1755 and was buried on 9 June in Równe cemetery. Antonina now spent half her time in the country and half in the city setting of Lwów, with an additional two years in Warsaw, to gain access to the Court of Stanisław August Poniatowski. Her creativity continued and she is known to have won plaudits in January 1774, when Walenty Tepper, professor of Rhetoric of the Zamoyski Academy, dedicated his Wiersz smutny śmierć męczeńską św. Jana Chrzciciela wyrażający (1774), to her.

== Selected works ==
- Krótkie ze świata zebranie koniektur, odmienne alternaty przez pieśni świeckie wyrażające, samej prawdzie nieskazitelnej Bogu przez krótkie aprobaty przyznawające, od jednej polskiej damy, tj.: A.Z.I.N.L.O., komponowane dla częstej refleksji człowiekowi roku 1743, Lwów 1743.
- Le beau Polonois (1681), Jean de Préchac translated into Polish as Feniks rzadki na świecie tj. Przyjaciel w różnych intrygach i awanturach stateczny, JMPan Walewski wojewodzic chełmiński... 1750. She translated at least four other works from the French.
- Historia o kawalerze polskim Walewskim...z Beraldą w intrygach statecznej miłości zostający... 1750, with a dedication to Stanisław Lubomirski and his brother, Józef, owners of Smila.
- Wiersze polskie. 1753

== Bibliography ==
- Gomulicki, Wiktor (1900). "Antonina Niemiryczowa". Tygodnik Mód i Powieści (in Polish). 17, 29-31. 27, 36-39.
- "Encyklopedia Wiedzy Ogólnej". Wędrowiec (in Polish). IX: 373. 1875.
- Gomulicki, Wiktor (1912). "Zapomniana poetka polska". Kłosy polskiej niwy (in Polish). Warsaw. pp. 289–382.
- Czyż, Antoni (1988). "Antonina Niemiryczowa czyli rokoko metafizyczne". Ja i Bóg. Poezja metafizyczna późnego baroku (in Polish). Wrocław. pp. 101–106.
- Rabowicz E. (1978) "Niemiryczowa Antonina (c. 1700–1780)", Polski Słownik Biograficzny XXIII: 1 – 3 (in Polish)
- Libera, Zdzisław (1976). Poezja polska XVIII wieku (in Polish). Warsaw. pp. 103–105, 117.
- Stasiewicz, Krystyna (1998). Pisarki polskie epok dawnych (in Polish). Olsztyn.
