= Administrative divisions of Ternopil Oblast =

Ternopil Oblast is subdivided into districts (raions) which are subdivided into territorial communities (hromadas).

== Current ==
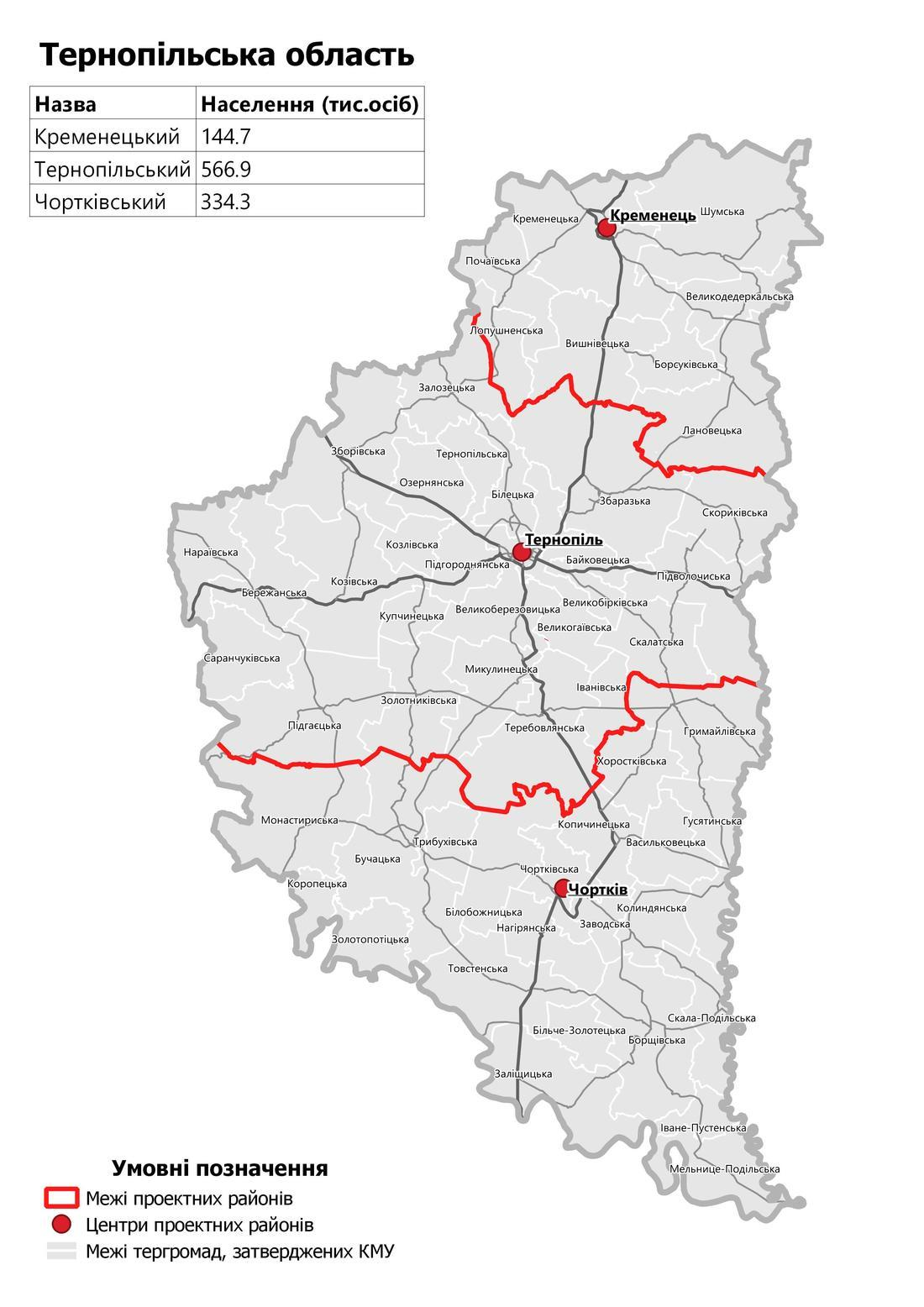
Raions of Ternopil Oblast as of August 2020.

On 18 July 2020, the number of districts was reduced to three. These are:

1. Chortkiv (Чортківський район), the center is in the town of Chortkiv;
2. Kremenets (Кременецький район), the center is in the town of Kremenets;
3. Ternopil (Тернопільський район), the center is in the city of Ternopil.

**Ternopil Oblast**
As of January 1, 2022
Number of districts (райони)	3
Number of hromadas (громади)	55

=== Communities (hromadas) per District (raion) ===
In bold are communities (hromadas) with cities

Chortkiv Raion

- Bilche-Zolote
- Bilobozhnytsia
- **Borshchiv**
- **Buchach**
- **Chortkiv**
- Hrymailiv
- Husiatyn
- Ivane-Puste
- **Khorostkiv**
- Kolyndiany
- **Kopychyntsi**
- Koropets
- Melnytsia-Podilska
- **Monastyryska**
- Nahirianka
- Skala-Podilska
- Tovste
- Trybukhivtsi
- Vasylkivtsi
- Zavodske
- **Zalishchyky**
- Zolotyi Potik

Kremenets Raion

- Borsuky
- **Kremenets**
- **Lanivtsi**
- Lopushne
- **Pochayiv**
- **Shumsk**
- Velyki Dederkaly
- Vyshnivets

Ternopil Raion

- Baikivtsi
- **Berezhany**
- Bila
- Ivanivka
- Kozova
- Kozliv
- Kupchyntsi
- Mykulyntsi
- Narayiv
- Ozerna
- **Pidhaitsi**
- Pidhorodnie
- Pidvolochysk
- Saranchuky
- **Skalat**
- Skoryky
- **Terebovlia**
- **Ternopil**
- Velyka Berezovytsia
- Velyki Birky
- Velyki Hayi
- Zaliztsi
- **Zbarazh**
- **Zboriv**
- Zolotnyky

== Administrative divisions until 2020 ==
Raions of Ternopil Oblast prior to 2020. The city of Ternopil is shown in dark blue.

Before 2020, Ternopil Oblast was subdivided into 21 regions: 17 districts (raions) and 4 city municipalities (mis'krada or misto), officially known as territories governed by city councils.

- Cities under the oblast's jurisdiction:
  - Ternopil (Тернопіль), the administrative center of the oblast
  - Berezhany Municipality
    - Cities under the city's jurisdiction:
      - Berezhany (Бережани)
  - Chortkiv (Чортків)
  - Kremenets (Кременець)
- Districts (raions):
  - Berezhany (Бережанський район)
  - Borshchiv (Борщівський район)
    - Cities under the district's jurisdiction:
      - Borshchiv (Борщів)
    - Urban-type settlements under the district's jurisdiction:
      - Melnytsia-Podilska (Мельниця-Подільська)
      - Skala-Podilska (Скала-Подільська)
  - Buchach (Бучацький район)
    - Cities under the district's jurisdiction:
      - Buchach (Бучач)
    - Urban-type settlements under the district's jurisdiction:
      - Zolotyi Potik (Золотий Потік)
  - Chortkiv (Чортківський район)
    - Urban-type settlements under the district's jurisdiction:
      - Zavodske (Заводське)
  - Husiatyn (Гусятинський район)
    - Cities under the district's jurisdiction:
      - Khorostkiv (Хоростків)
      - Kopychyntsi (Копичинці)
    - Urban-type settlements under the district's jurisdiction:
      - Hrymailiv (Гримайлів)
      - Husiatyn (Гусятин)
  - Kozova (Козівський район)
    - Urban-type settlements under the district's jurisdiction:
      - Kozliv (Козлів)
      - Kozova (Козова)
  - Kremenets (Кременецький район)
    - Cities under the district's jurisdiction:
      - Pochaiv (Почаїв)
  - Lanivtsi (Лановецький район)
    - Cities under the district's jurisdiction:
      - Lanivtsi (Ланівці)
  - Monastyryska (Монастириський район)
    - Cities under the district's jurisdiction:
      - Monastyryska (Монастириська)
    - Urban-type settlements under the district's jurisdiction:
      - Koropets (Коропець)
  - Pidhaitsi (Підгаєцький район)
    - Cities under the district's jurisdiction:
      - Pidhaitsi (Підгайці)
  - Pidvolochysk (Підволочиський район)
    - Cities under the district's jurisdiction:
      - Skalat (Скалат)
    - Urban-type settlements under the district's jurisdiction:
      - Pidvolochysk (Підволочиськ)
  - Shumsk (Шумський район)
    - Cities under the district's jurisdiction:
      - Shumsk (Шумськ)
  - Terebovlia (Теребовлянський район)
    - Cities under the district's jurisdiction:
      - Terebovlia (Теребовля)
    - Urban-type settlements under the district's jurisdiction:
      - Druzhba (Дружба)
      - Mykulyntsi (Микулинці)
  - Ternopil (Тернопільський район)
    - Urban-type settlements under the district's jurisdiction:
      - Velyka Berezovytsia (Велика Березовиця)
      - Velyki Birky (Великі Бірки)
  - Zalishchyky (Заліщицький район)
    - Cities under the district's jurisdiction:
      - Zalishchyky (Заліщики)
    - Urban-type settlements under the district's jurisdiction:
      - Tovste (Товсте)
  - Zbarazh (Збаразький район)
    - Cities under the district's jurisdiction:
      - Zbarazh (Збараж)
    - Urban-type settlements under the district's jurisdiction:
      - Vyshnivets (Вишнівець)
  - Zboriv (Зборівський район)
    - Cities under the district's jurisdiction:
      - Zboriv (Зборів)
    - Urban-type settlements under the district's jurisdiction:
      - Zaliztsi (Залізці)
