= Tadeusz Franciszek Ogiński =

Polish noble (1712–1783)

- Prince
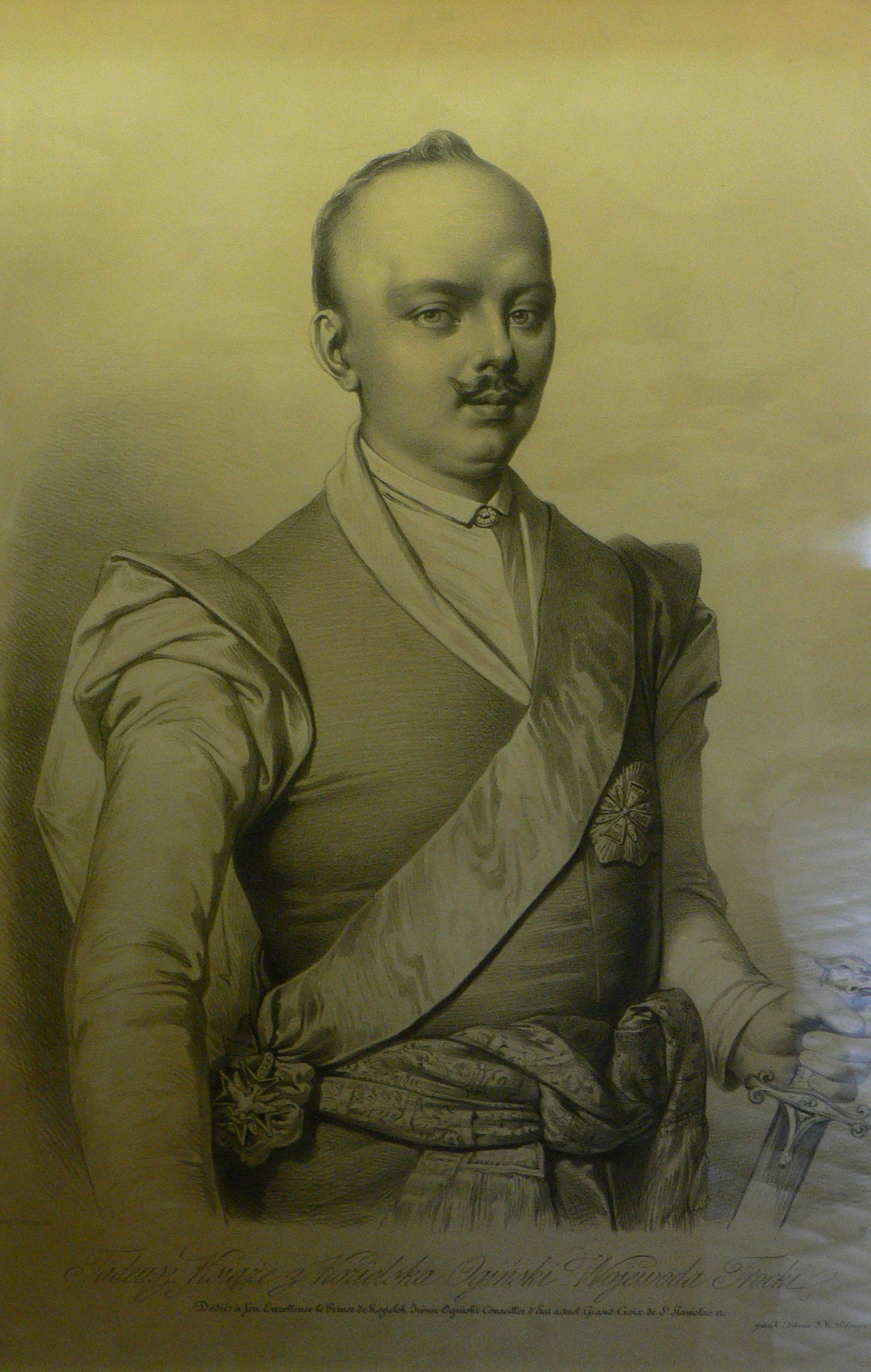
- Coat of arms: Brama
- Born: 26 August 1712
- Died: 31 December 1783 (aged 71)
- Noble family: Ogiński
- Consorts: Izabella Radziwiłł; Jadwiga Załuska
- Father: Marcjan Michal Oginski
- Mother: Teresa Brzostowska

Prince Tadeusz Franciszek Andrzej Ogiński (Belarusian: Тадэвуш Францішак Андрэй Агінскі, Lithuanian: Tadas Pranciškus Andrius Oginskis) was a szlachcic from the Polish–Lithuanian Commonwealth.

He was Grand Clerk of Lithuania starting in 1737, castellan of Trakai starting in 1744, voivode of Trakai starting in 1770, starost of Oszmiański, Wierzbowski and Przewalski.

He had two wives, Izabella Radziwiłł and Jadwiga Załuska. He had two children with Radziwiłł, Andrzej Ignacy Ogiński and Franciszek Ksawery Ogiński.

Marshal of the Sejm (zwyczajnego) on 5 October - 19 November 1744 in Hrodna.

Knight of the Order of the White Eagle, awarded on 3 August 1742.
