= Jerzy Jełowicki =

Polish painter

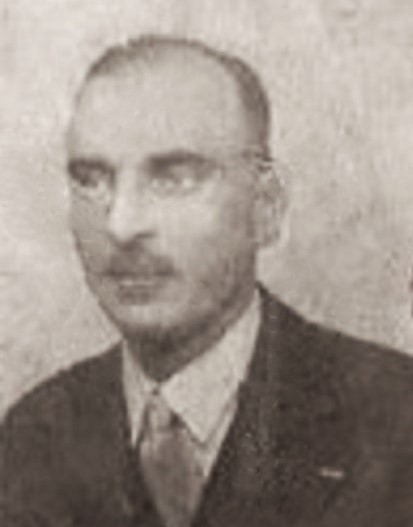
- Born: 11 August 1899; Rożniatówka, Podolia Governorate, Russian Empire
- Died: 22 September 1939 (aged 40); Łomianki, Poland
- Other name: Jerzy Bożeniec Jełowicki
- Occupations: agronomist and Painter
- Awards: Virtuti Militari

Jerzy Jełowicki (11 August 1899 – 22 September 1939) was a Polish landowner, agricultural engineer, military reservist and painter. For his service as a military reservist, he was awarded the Order of Virtuti Militari. He obtained his degree in agronomy at the Warsaw University of Life Sciences, followed by studies at the Academy of Fine Arts in Warsaw.

His work was part of the painting event in the art competition at the 1936 Summer Olympics. He was killed three weeks into the German invasion of Poland in the Siege of Warsaw during World War II.
