= Elżbieta Drużbacka =

Polish poet

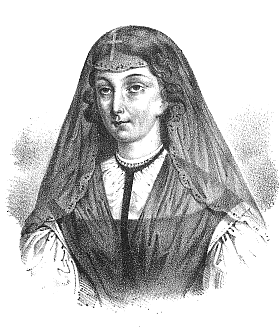
Elżbieta Drużbacka

Elżbieta Drużbacka (née Kowalska, May 3 1698 – March 14, 1765 in Tarnów) was a Polish poet of the late Baroque period. Little is known of her life. She learned French at the court of Elżbieta Sieniawska. She married a Kazimierz Drużbacki, Skarbnik of Żydaczów and had two daughters. After she was widowed, she moved to the Bernardine monastery at Tarnów, where she died. Her best known work is Opisanie czterech części roku ("Description of the Four Seasons").

== Biography ==
Little is known of the life of Drużbacka. She was born 3rd May 1698 to the Kowalski family, and may have grown up in Greater Poland (Wielkopolska). She learned French at the court of Elżbieta Sieniawska, the wife of Adam Mikołaj Sieniawski and a renowned patron of the arts. It is not known what other education Drużbacka received.

She was married some time between 1720 and 1726 to Kazimierz Drużbacki and they had two daughters together. Marianna, second daughter, married Andrzej Wiesiołowski. Drużbacka’s husband died around 1736, and she became a client of Barbara Sanguszkowa . Later she resided in the Bernardine monastery at Tarnów, where she died on 14 March 1765.

One of Drużback’s granddaughters was the grandmother of Aleksander Fredro, the Polish poet, playwright and author.

Much of Drużbacka’s work deals with the beauty of nature; her best known work is Opisanie czterech części roku ("Description of the Four Seasons"). Other works include Life of David, Life of Mary Magdalena and Story of Prince Adolf .

The only volume of her work published in her lifetime was put together by bishops Józef Andrzej Załuski and Andrzej Stanisław, the creators of the Załuski library. Her manuscripts were archived in the Krasiński Library, but were destroyed in the Warsaw Uprising.
