= Marya Kasterska =

Polish writer (1894–1969)

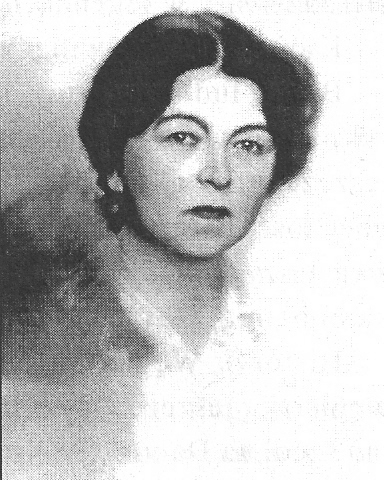
- Born: 5 February 1894 Warsaw, Poland
- Died: 7 December 1969 (aged 75) Paris, France

Marya Kasterska (5 February 1894 – 7 December 1969) was a Polish writer, journalist and literary critic who lived in France.

== Biography ==
She was born in Warsaw. She received a doctorate from the University of Paris in 1918. Her articles appeared in various publications, including Les Nouvelles littéraires, La vie catholique, Revue de France, La Revue mondiale, Fontaine, L'Art vivant, La Quinzaine critique and La Muse française'. In Paris, she promoted knowledge there of Polish and Romanian culture.

In 1918, she married Petre Sergescu, a Romanian mathematician, in Paris. The couple hosted a salon in their home in the Latin Quarter of Paris which was attended by various intellectuals including Henry de Montherlant, Mircea Eliade, Paul Montel and Émile Borel.

== Awards and honours ==
In 1961, she was awarded the Prix d'Aumale by the French Academy of Sciences for her work editing the biography for her husband's works. In 1967, she was awarded the Prix Valentine de Wolmar by the Académie française for her published work.
