= Hubnyk =

Village in Haisyn Raion, Vinnytsia Oblast

- Village
- Location in Ukraine Hubnyk (Ukraine)
- Coordinates: 48°37′09″N 29°19′50″E
- Country: Ukraine
- Oblast: Vinnytsia Oblast
- Raion: Haisyn Raion
- Elevation: 236 m (774 ft)
- Population: 2,055
- Postal code: 23746
- Area code: +380

Hubnyk is a Ukrainian village in the Haisyn Raion of Vinnytsia Oblast.

== Demographics ==
According to the 2001 census, the majority of Hubnyk's population was Ukrainian (97.79%), with a minority of Russian speakers (1.99%).

== Notable residents ==
- Edward Jełowicki, Polish military Colonel, inventor
- Aleksander Jełowicki, Polish insurgent, publisher and priest
