= Edward Jełowicki =

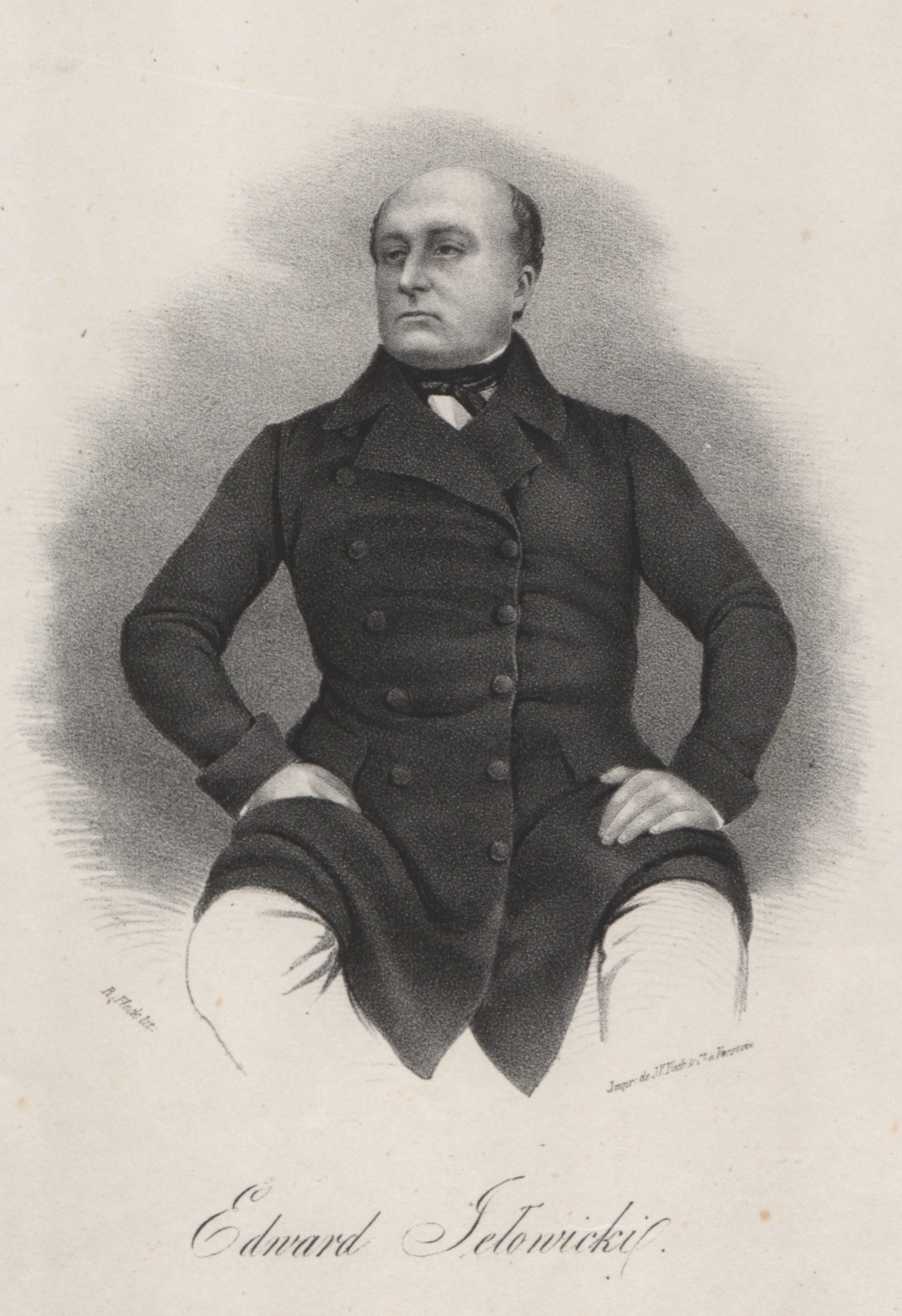
- Edward Bożeniec Jełowicki
- Born: 1 May 1803; Hubnik, Podolia Governorate, Russian Empire
- Died: 10 November 1848 (aged 45); Vienna, Austria-Hungary
- Military career
- Allegiance: Austria-Hungary; France; Congress Poland
- Service years: 1821–1848
- Rank: colonel
- Conflicts: November Uprising, Algeria
- Awards: Virtuti Militari, Legion of Honour
- Other work: Engineer, inventor

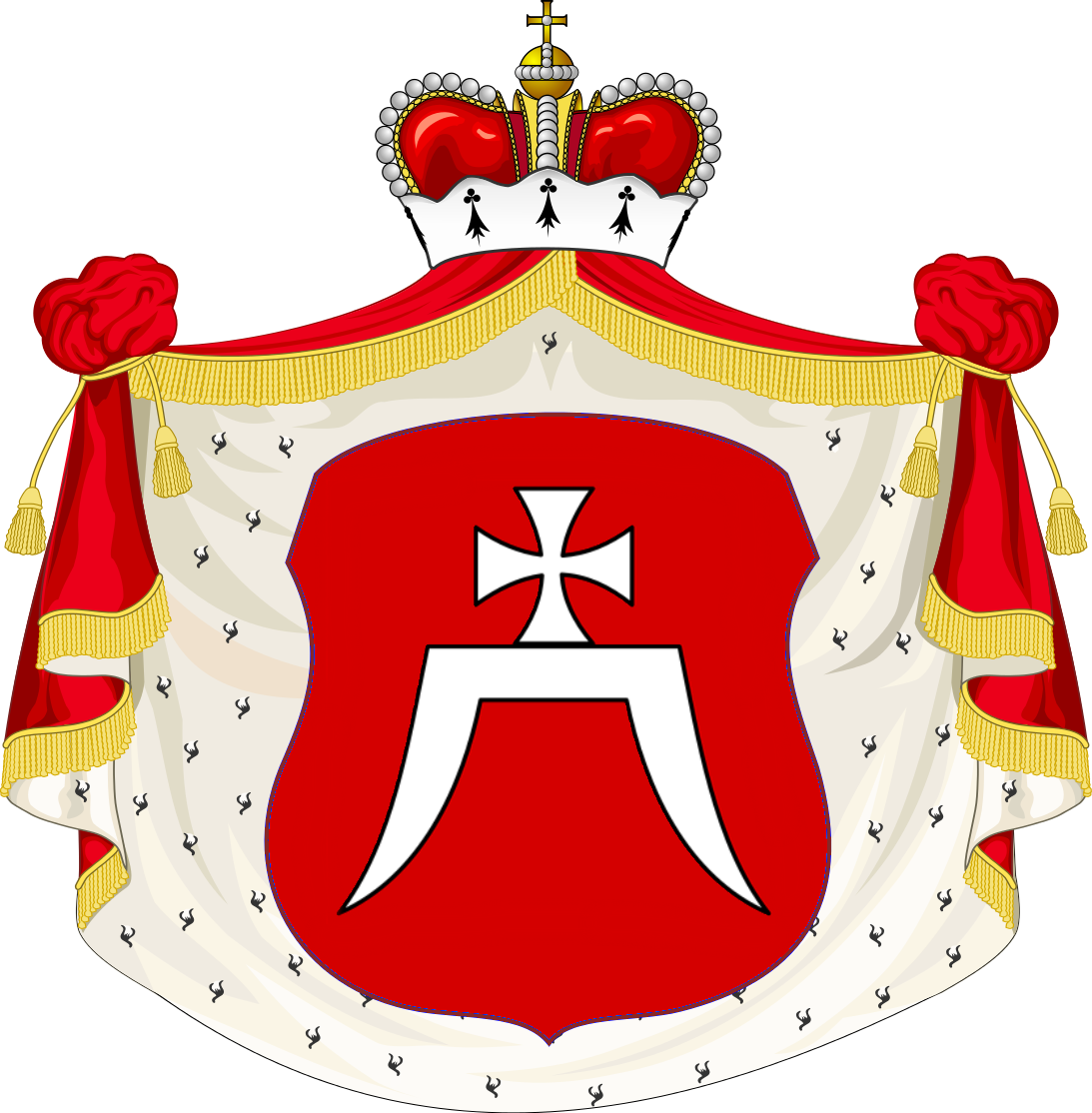
Jełowicki ducal crest

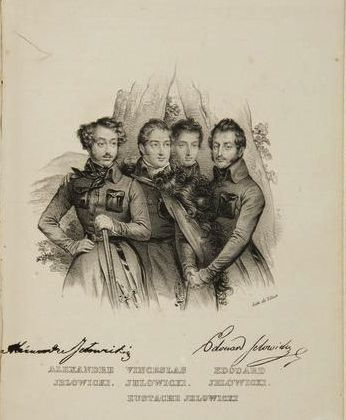
l. to r. Aleksander, Wacław (father), Eustachy and Edward Jełowicki in 1830

Edward Bożeniec Jełowicki born 1803 in Hubnik, in the Podolia Governorate of the Russian Empire (now in Western Ukraine), died 10 November 1848 in Vienna, was a Polish landowner, decorated Colonel in the Polish army, insurgent, officer in the Foreign Legion and commander of the Vienna artillery. He was an engineer and inventor.

== Biography ==
=== Family ===
Descended from Ruthenian aristocracy, his family had been integrated into the Polish Szlachta and converted from Orthodoxy to Roman Catholicism during the Republic of Two Nations. Edward was the eldest son of Wacław Jełowicki and his wife Franciszka née Izdebska. He had two younger brothers, the publisher, writer and priest, Aleksander and Eustachy and a sister, Hortensja, who married Piotr Sobański.

=== Career ===
An alumnus of the Vienna Theresian Military Academy, he was elected Marshal of Gaysinsky Uyezd. He took a leading part in the November Uprising in Ukraine, with his father and two brothers, until its undoing in 1831 when with his younger brother, Aleksander, he evaded capture by escaping into Austria-Hungary. After much travel across Europe and Algeria, he pursued further studies at the postgraduate École d’état-major in Paris and the Ecole Centrale Paris. In 1836 during a quiet spell in London, he designed and took out two British Patents on his Steam turbine, one being in England. The other patent was granted in Edinburgh for "certain improvements to his steam engine", on 16 July 1836.

Back in Paris he frequented Adam Mickiewicz, whose Paris publisher was Edward's brother, Aleksander Jełowicki. Like his brother, he was also a friend of Frederic Chopin.

Caught up in the Spring of Nations that swept over Europe in 1848, he was executed in Vienna on the order of Alfred I, Prince of Windisch-Grätz. He left a widow and two children.

== Distinctions ==
- Order of Virtuti Militari
- Légion d'Honneur

== See also ==
- Jełowicki family
- Great Emigration
