= Aleksander Jełowicki =

Polish Roman Catholic priest and publisher

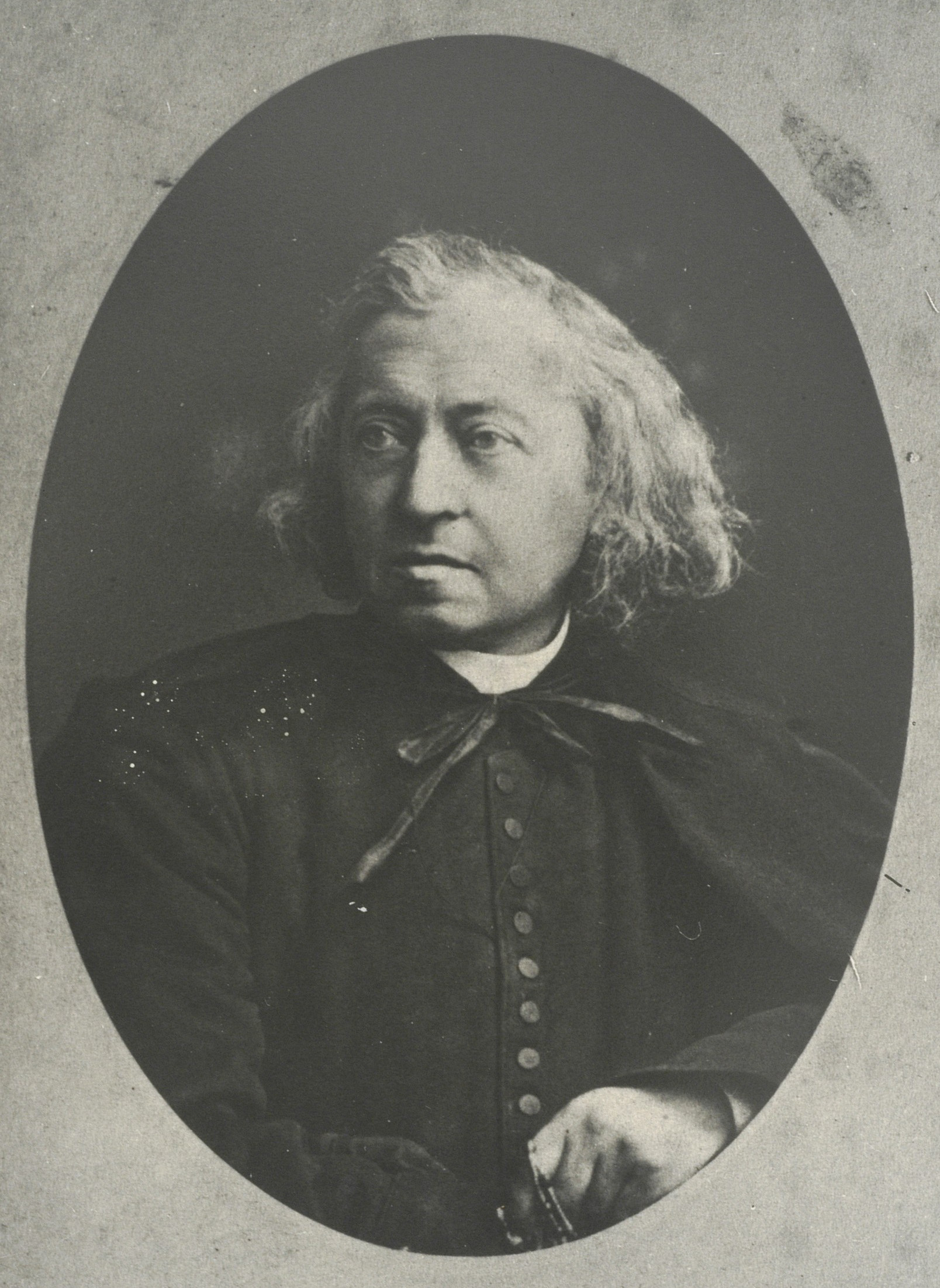
Aleksander Jełowicki

Aleksander Jełowicki (18 December 1804 in Hubnyk - 15 April 1877 in Rome) was a Polish writer, poet, translator and publisher. He was a veteran of the November Uprising, deputy to the Sejm of Congress Poland for the Haisyn powiat and political exile in France, where he was a social activist, superior of the Polish Catholic Mission in Paris and monk.

Among the works he published are the first editions of Adam Mickiewicz's Part III of Dziady (1832) and Pan Tadeusz (1834). Between 1835 and 1838 he was leading partner of the publishing house and printing works, Jełowicki i S-ka in Paris. His list of authors constitutes a major part of Poland's 19th-century literary canon and includes: Juliusz Słowacki, Zygmunt Krasiński, Julian Ursyn Niemcewicz, Kazimierz Brodziński, Stefan Witwicki, Wincenty Pol, Antoni Gorecki, Maurycy Mochnacki, Joachim Lelewel, Henryk Rzewuski, Michał Czajkowski, Klementyna Hoffmanowa, Ignacy Krasicki.

In 1844 he arrived in Paris, where he held the position of the superior of the Polish Mission at the Church of St. Roch; from 1849 in the church of l' Assomption. As the superior of the Mission, he dealt with Makryna Mieczysławska (actually a certain Wińczowa from Lithuania, as proved in 1923 by Jan Urban), the alleged abbess of the Basilian nuns from Minsk, whose martyrdom in the Russian Empire was to be used as a tool of anti-Russian propaganda in the West, especially in Rome. In October 1845, he accompanied her to Rome and helped found a Basilian convent in Rome. The person of Mieczyslavska aroused many controversies from the beginning.

As chaplain to Polish artists in exile, in October 1849 he heard the last confession of Frédéric Chopin and gave him the last rites. He was present when the composer died. He described the musician's final moments in a letter, dated 21 October, to countess Xawera Grocholska.

He was a founding member of the Resurrectionist Order and conducted an extended correspondence with its Father General, Piotr Semenenko. He was a younger brother of Edward Jełowicki.

During the Franco-Prussian War (1870-1871), the veteran insurgent applied for the role of chaplain to the fighters in Paris and ministered to injured soldiers, binding their wounds and helped folk of all faiths. He died during a trip to Rome in April 1877. His body was transferred to Paris and buried at the Cimetière des Champeaux de Montmorency in Montmorency, Val-d'Oise, the largest 19th-c. Polish cemetery in France.
