= Lanivtsi =

City in Ternopil Oblast, Ukraine

Lanivtsi Ланівці
- City
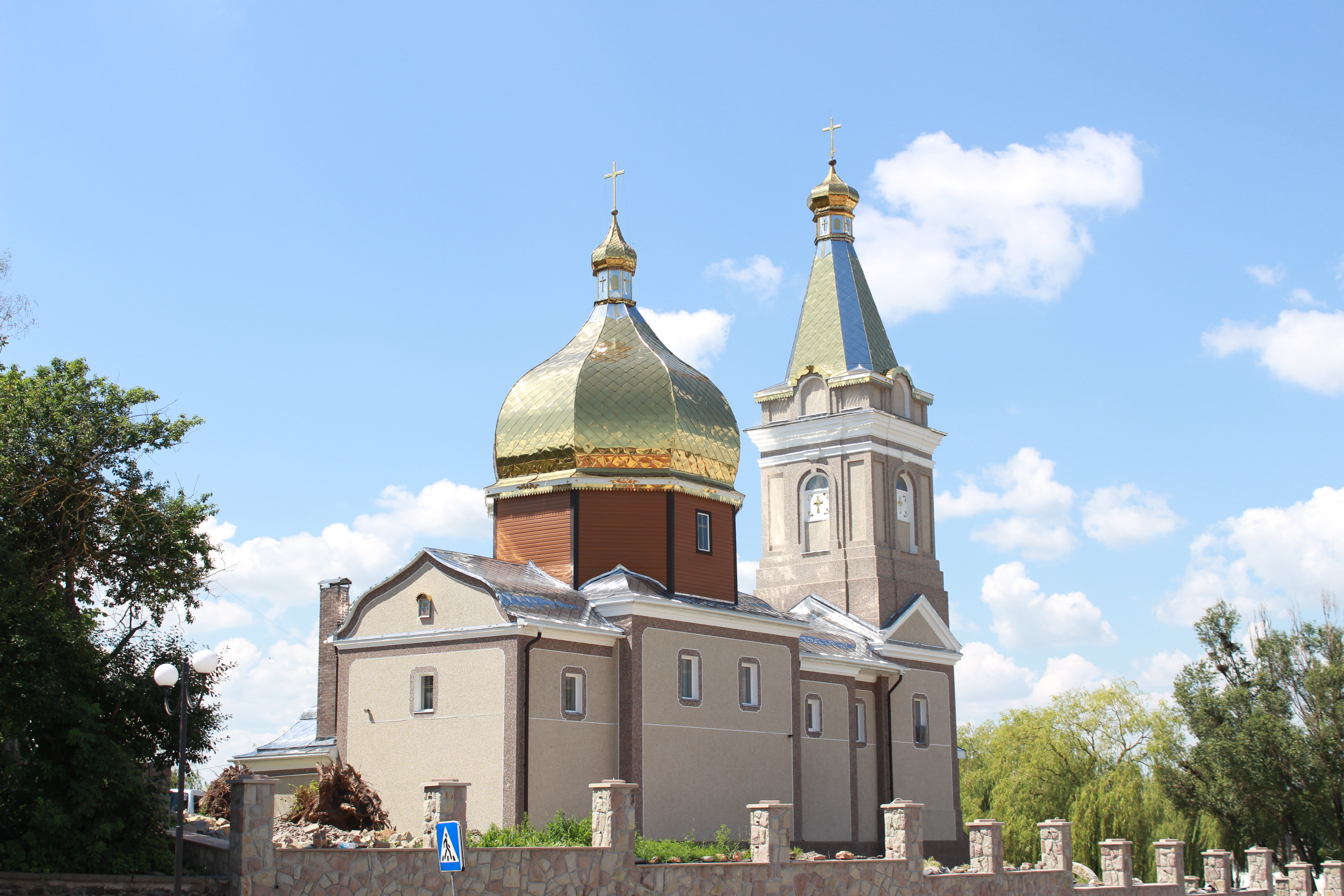
- Intercession Church erected in 1857 by Teodor Jełowicki

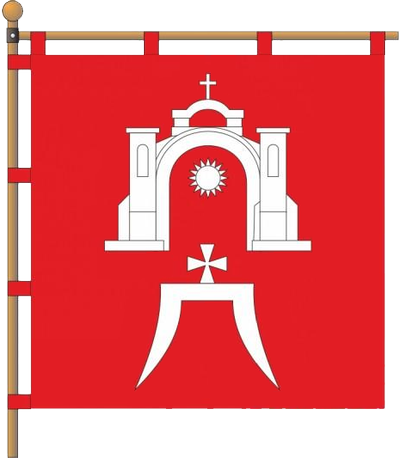
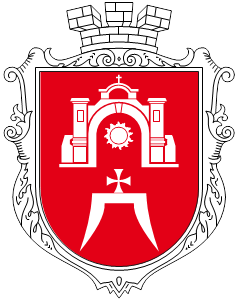
- Flag Coat of arms

- Location of Lanivtsi Lanivtsi (Ternopil Oblast)
- Coordinates: 49°52′12″N 26°04′48″E
- Country: Ukraine
- Oblast: Ternopil Oblast
- Raion: Kremenets Raion
- Hromada: Lanivtsi urban hromada
- Magdeburg rights: 1545
- City status: 17 May 2001

Area
  - Total: 14.7 km^{2} (5.7 sq mi)

Population (2022)
  - Total: 8,215
  - Density: 559/km^{2} (1,450/sq mi)
- Time zone: UTC+2 (EET)
  - Summer (DST): UTC+3 (EEST)
- Postal code: 47402
- Area code: +380 3549
- Website: lanivtsi

Lanivtsi (Ukrainian: Ланівці, IPA: [ˈlɑn⁽ʲ⁾iu̯ts⁽ʲ⁾i]; Russian: Лановцы, romanized: Lanovtsy; Polish: Łanowce; Yiddish: לאַנאָוויץ, romanized: Lanovits) is a city in Kremenets Raion, Ternopil Oblast, Ukraine. It hosts the administration of Lanivtsi urban hromada, one of the hromadas of Ukraine. Population: 8,215 (2022 estimate); 8,680 (2001).

== History ==
Lanivtsi received a town charter in 1545 from the Polish king. Until the Partitions of Poland, it was part of Volhynian Voivodeship. Ashkenazi Jews began to settle there later. In 1795–1918, Lanivtsi was occupied by the Russian Empire. In 1897 the Jewish population numbered 1,174 of a total of 2,525 in the city. Numbers of Jews were killed in pogroms, and others immigrated to Western Europe or the United States. By 1921 the population in the city was 640. There was a Tarbut school and a yeshiva, and many of the younger people became Zionists.

In the Second Polish Republic between the world wars, Lanivtsi, known then as Łanowce, belonged to Krzemieniec County, Volhynian Voivodeship. For centuries, Lanivtsi was the center of an area of large estates that belonged to several noble families, such as the Jelowicki, Wiśniowiecki, Mniszech and Rzewuski.

In 1939 the town was invaded by the Soviet Union, and then invaded by Nazi Germany in 1941, with occupation starting July 3 of that year. The Germans created a Jewish ghetto in Łanowce, where Jews worked as forced laborers. Jews from neighboring villages were transported and confined there in 1942. From August 13–14, 1942, 1,833 Jews were murdered beside open pits, where they were buried in mass graves. Few survived the Holocaust.

Until 18 July 2020, Lanivtsi was the administrative center of Lanivtsi Raion. The raion was abolished in July 2020 as part of the administrative reform of Ukraine, which reduced the number of raions in Ternopil Oblast to three. The area of Lanivtsi Raion was merged into Kremenets Raion.
