= Antoni Gorecki =

Polish poet and writer

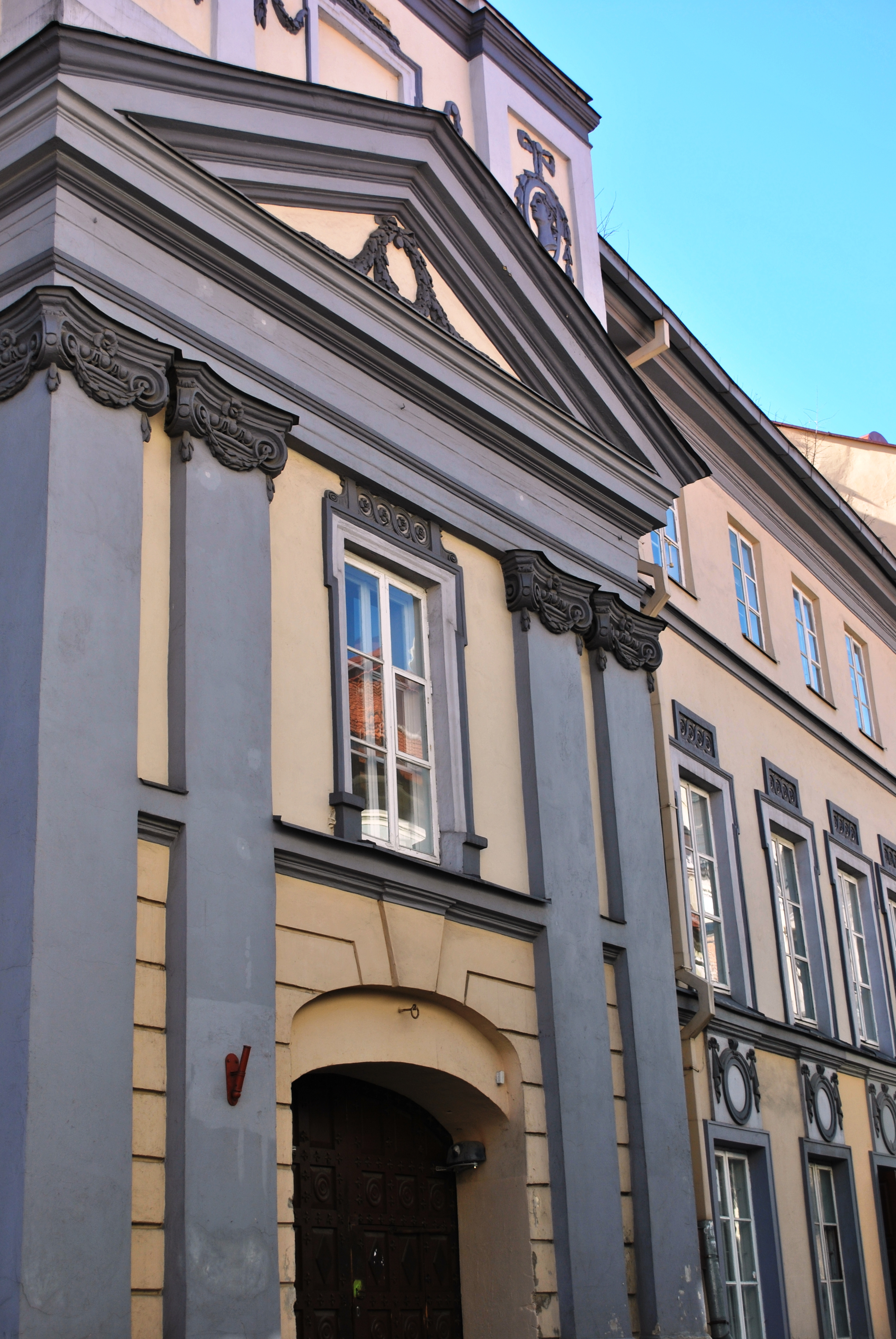
Antoni Gorecki House, Vilnius

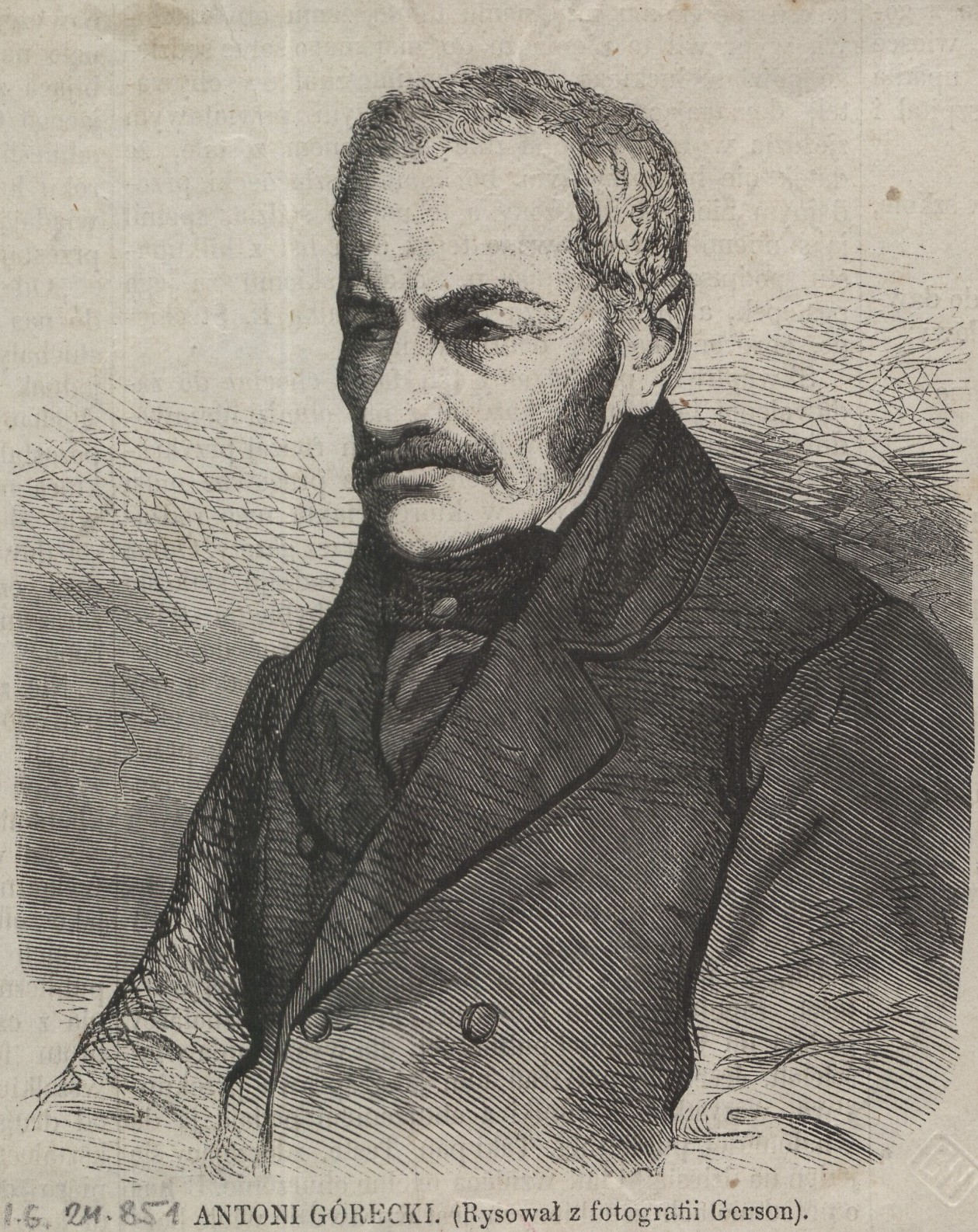
Drawing of Gorecki

Antoni Gorecki (1787 – 18 September 1861) was a Polish poet and writer, author of satires and short stories for children.

He was born in 1787 in Vilnius, where he finished primary school. In 1802 he started studying at the Faculty of Literature of the University of Vilnius, where he became friends with Joachim Lelewel. In 1805 he graduated and soon afterwards he left Imperial Russia for the Duchy of Warsaw. In 1809 he volunteered for the Army of the Duchy of Warsaw to fight alongside Napoleon Bonaparte in the Napoleonic Wars. Between 1809 and 1812 he took part in most of the battles that took place in the territory of the former Polish–Lithuanian Commonwealth. After the Congress of Vienna he remained in exile and travelled across Europe, but finally in 1818 he returned to his hometown.

There he published many of his poems, short stories, fables and fairy-tales. Also, he was one of the most notable members of the Towarzystwo Szubrawców (Scumbags Society) and one of co-authors of its main organ - the Wiadomości Brukowe (Tabloid News) satirical weekly. In 1830 he again volunteered for the Polish Army and served during the November Uprising against Russia. After it was crushed, Gorecki had to leave his homeland and emigrated to France, where he finally settled in Paris. There, he was an active member of many notable Polish cultural and political associations. He also continued to publish new poems - eleven volumes all together. He also became one of the closest friends of Adam Mickiewicz. His son was later married to Mickiewicz's daughter, Maria.

Antoni Gorecki died on 18 September 1861, in Paris.
