= Józef Bem Memorial (Downtown, Warsaw) =

Monument in Warsaw, Poland

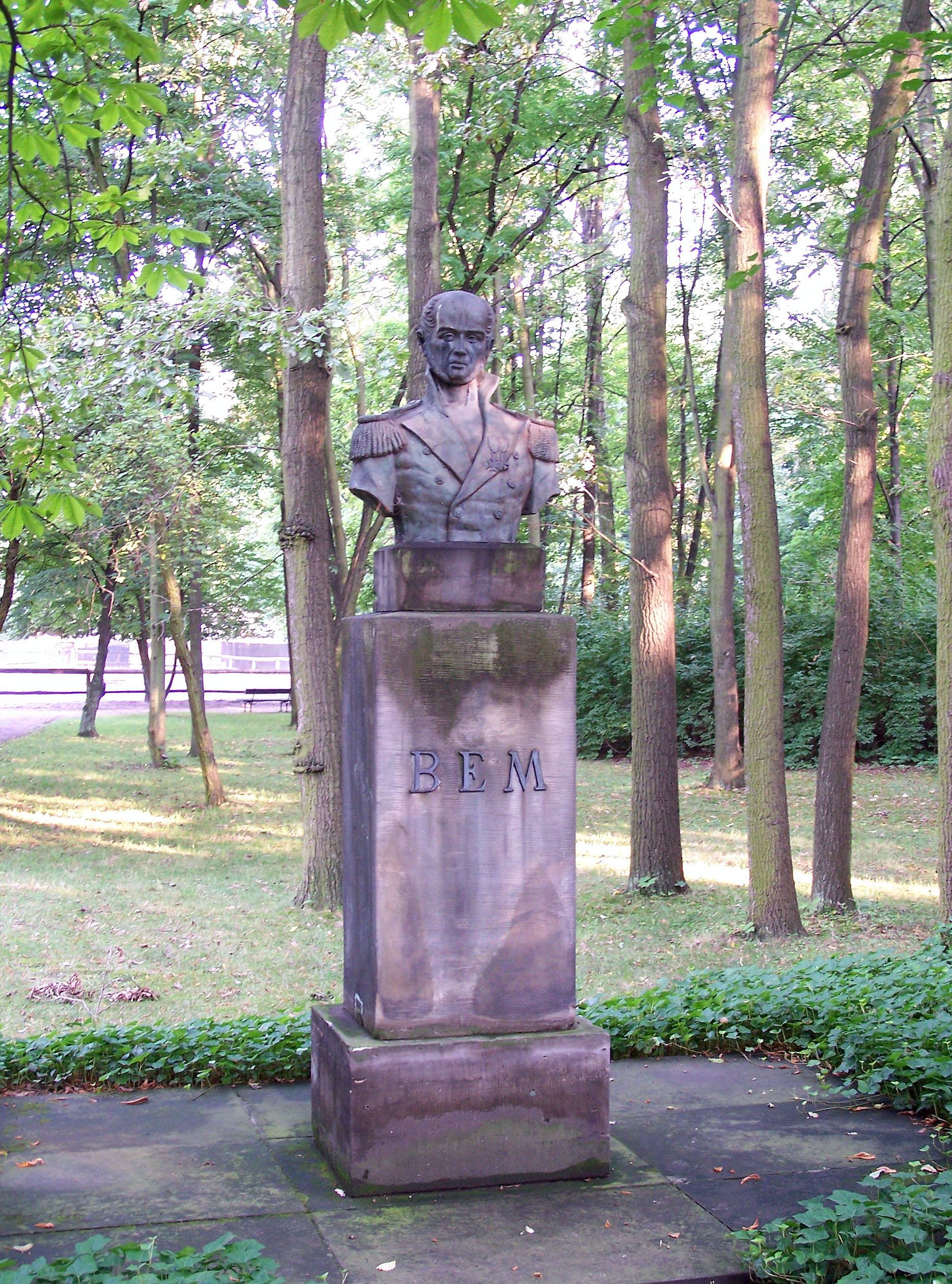
- The monument in 2010.
- Interactive map of Józef Bem Memorial
- Location: Royal Baths, Downtown, Warsaw, Poland
- Coordinates: 52°12′49.7″N 21°02′16.8″E
- Designer: Bohdan Święcicki
- Type: Bust
- Material: Bronze, stone
- Opening date: 1924
- Dedicated to: Józef Bem

The Józef Bem Memorial (Polish: Pomnik Józefa Bema) is a monument in Warsaw, Poland, placed in the Royal Baths park, within the Downtown district. It consists of a bust of Józef Bem, a 19th-century military officer, who was a leader of the Polish insurgent forces during the November Uprising. It was designed by Bohdan Święcicki, and unveiled in 1924. Originally it was placed at Dwudziestego Dziewiątego Listopada Street, and it was moved to its current location in 2004.

== History ==
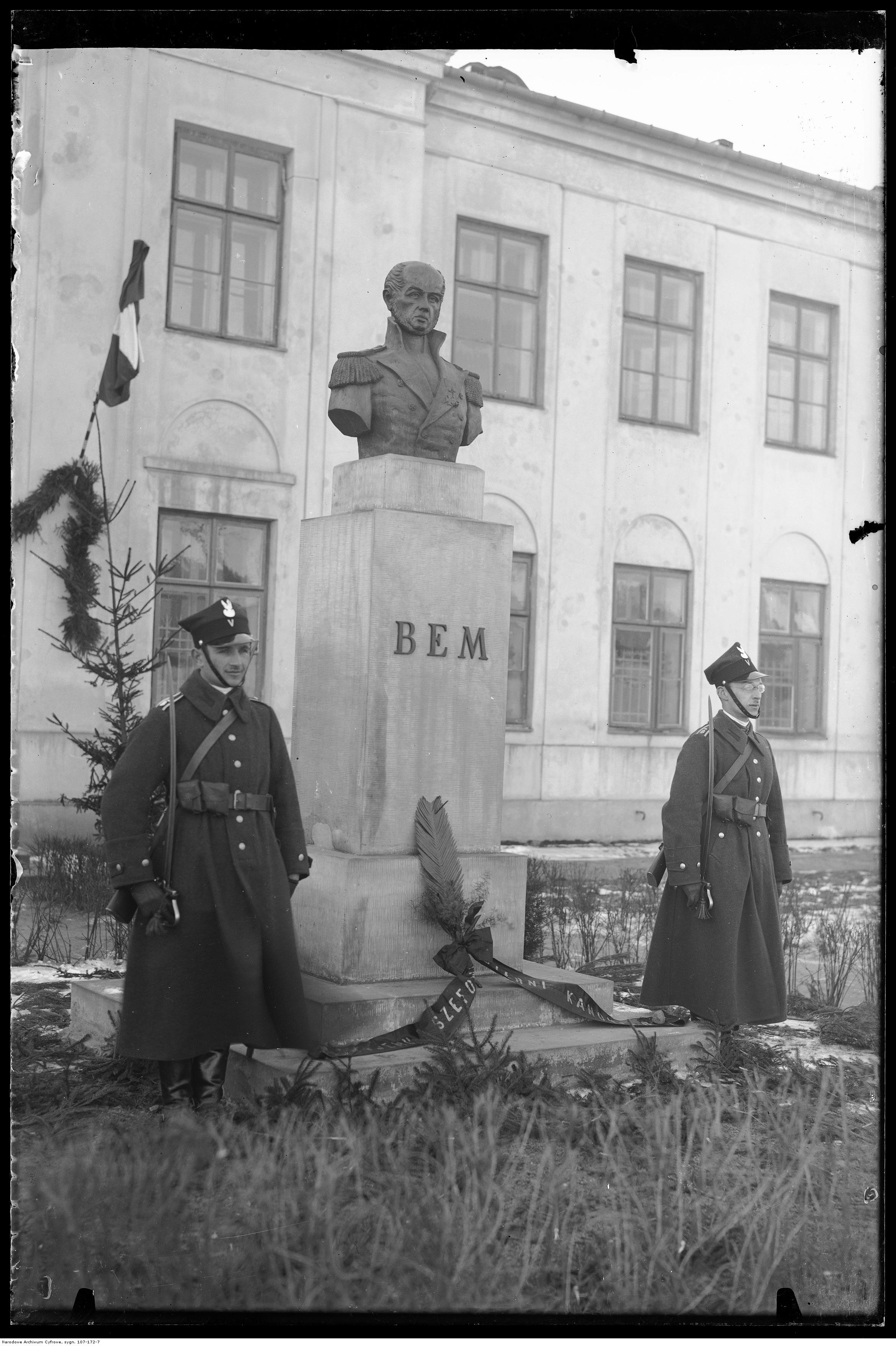
The monument in 1928.

The monument was proposed by the 1st Horse Artillery Division of the Polish Armed Forces, and unveiled at its barracks in 1924, near Dwudziestego Dziewiątego Listopada Street. It was designed by Bohdan Święcicki, and dedicated to Józef Bem, a 19th-century military officer, who was a leader of the Polish insurgent forces during the November Uprising. In 2004, the monument was moved to its current in the Royal Baths park.

== Characteristics ==
The monument is placed in the eastern sidd of the Royal Baths park, at the alley connecting the Royal Baths Amphitheatre and Hunting and Horseriding Museum. It consists of a bronze bust of Józef Bem, in a military coat with epaulette. To his chest are attached the Knight Cross of the Legion of Honour and the Gold Cross of the War Order of Virtuti Militari. The design was based on the 19th-century illustrations of Bem. The bust is placed on a stone pedestal divided vertically into three sections. It bears the inspiration "BEM" on it. The monument belongs to the Royal Baths Museum.
