= Lasków, Masovian Voivodeship =

Lasków
- Village
- Location within Poland
- Coordinates: 52°29′N 21°23′E
- Country: Poland
- Voivodeship: Masovian
- County: Wołomin
- Gmina: Dąbrówka

Lasków [ˈlaskuf] is a village in the administrative district of Gmina Dąbrówka, within Wołomin County, Masovian Voivodeship, in east-central Poland.

As Laskowo-Głuchy, it is the birthplace of poet Cyprian Kamil Norwid (1821–1883).
