= Vade-mecum (Norwid) =

1953 poetry collection by Cyprian Kamil Norwid

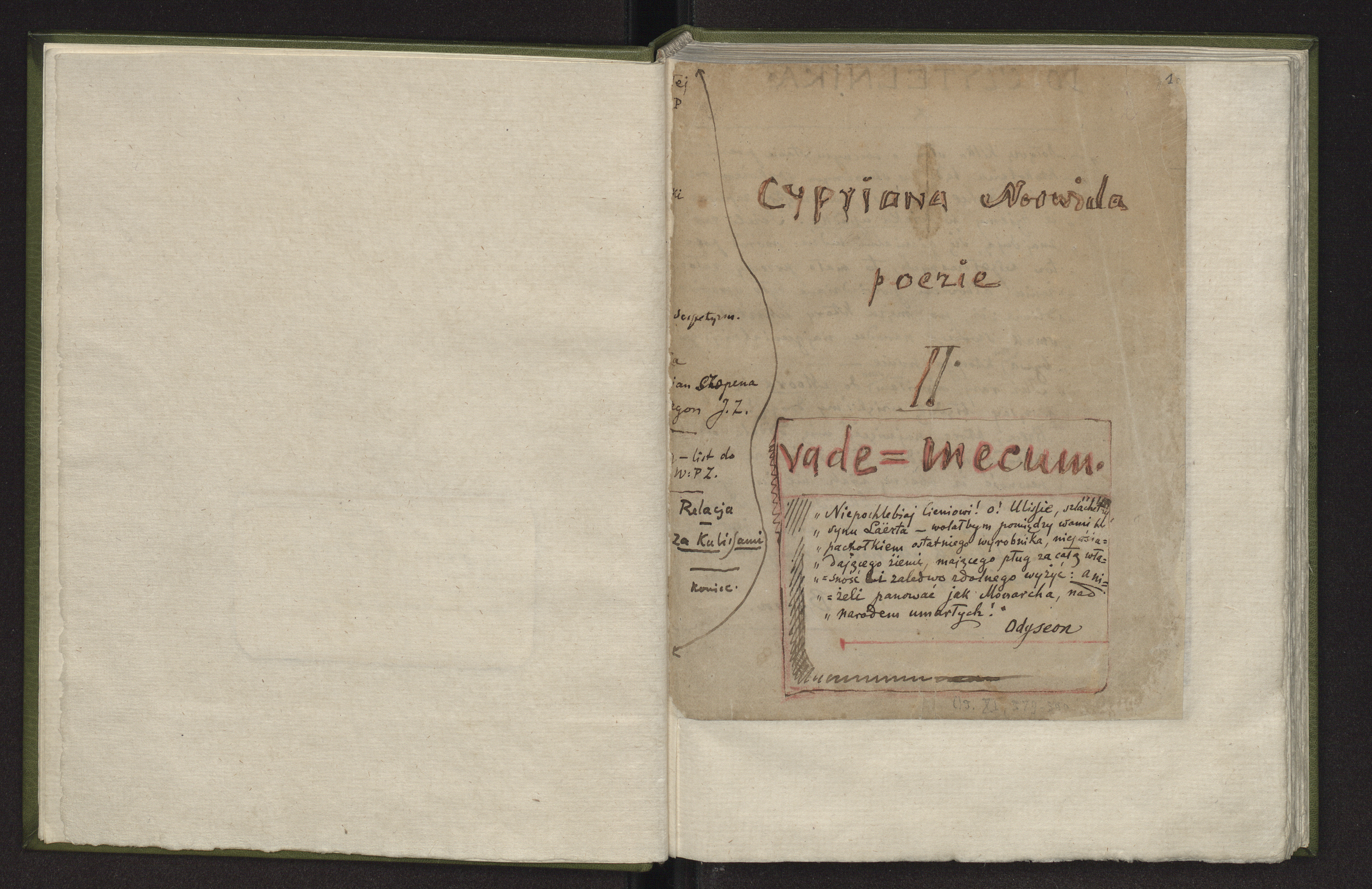
- Manuscript of Vade-mecum
- Author: Cyprian Kamil Norwid
- Language: Polish
- Genre: poetry
- Publisher: Oficyna Poetów i Malarzy na Emigracji
- Publication date: 1953
- Publication place: England

Vade-mecum is the most important collection of poetry by Cyprian Kamil Norwid.

In 1865-1866 Cyprian Kamil Norwid gathered the poems he had been writing since the end of the 1840s into a large cycle, mecum-vade, however, it was not published during the poet's lifetime, but fragments of the cycle were published in 1903–1933.

After Norwid's death, the manuscript of Vade-mecum was kept by his relatives, the Dybowski family and in 1898 it became the property of Zenon Przesmycki. Przesmycki died during the Warsaw Uprising, but his archives, together with Norwid's legacy, were saved and after the World War II found their way to the National Library of Poland. A phototype of manuscript was published by Wacław Borowy in 1947 and it was used as the basis for the first edition of Vade-mecum (Tunbridge, England 1953). A critical edition of Norwid's cycle was prepared in 1966 by Juliusz Wiktor Gomulicki. Since May 2024, an autograph copy of the Vade-mecum has been exhibited at a permanent exhibition in the Palace of the Commonwealth.

The one-hundred-poem collection includes poems which are so well known as With Hands Swollen from Clapping (Polish: Klaskaniem mając obrzękłe prawice), In Verona (Polish: W Weronie) and Chopin's Pianoforte (Polish: Fortepian Szopena) and is supplemented by a prose prologue, the poem Generalisations (Polish: Ogólniki). Some poems had been published earlier, some were written specially for the cycle and some came from the lyrical codex, an earlier manuscript.

== Bibliography ==
- Makowski, Tomasz; Sapała, Patryk, eds. (2024). The Palace of the Commonwealth. Three times opened. Treasures from the National Library of Poland at the Palace of the Commonwealth. Warsaw: National Library of Poland.
- Tchórzewska-Kabata, Halina; Dąbrowski, Maciej, eds. (2003). More precious than gold. Treasures of the Polish National Library (electronic version) (PDF). Translated by Dorosz, Janina. Warsaw: National Library of Poland. ISBN 83-7009-402-3.
