= Głuchy =

- Village
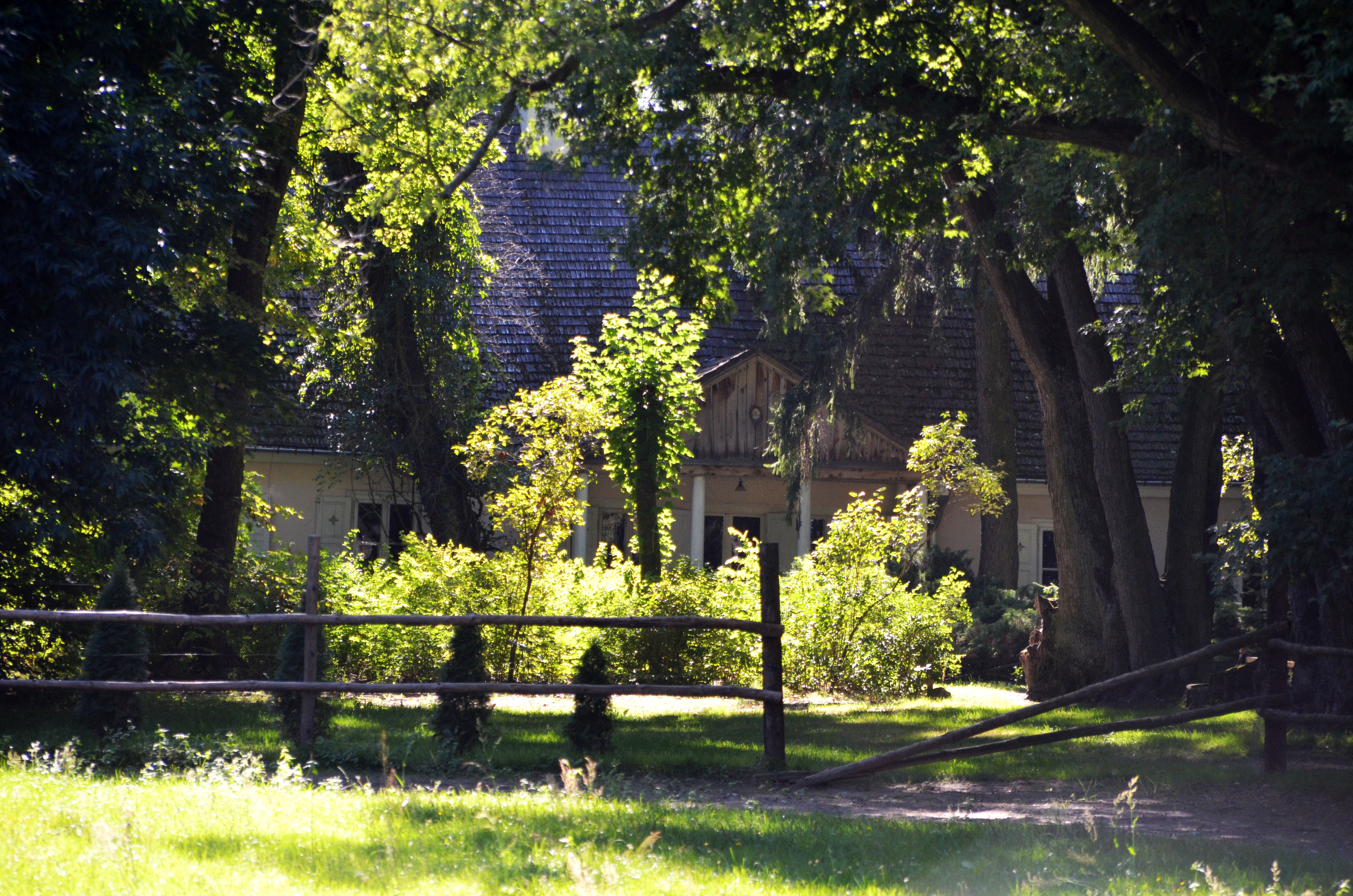
- Manor house in Głuchy

- Location within Poland
- Coordinates: 52°29′N 21°23′E
- Country: Poland
- Voivodeship: Masovian
- County: Wyszków
- Gmina: Zabrodzie
- Population (approx.): 300

Głuchy [ˈɡwuxɨ] is a village in the administrative district of Gmina Zabrodzie, within Wyszków County, Masovian Voivodeship, in east-central Poland.

Laskowo-Głuchy is the birthplace of poet Cyprian Kamil Norwid (1821–1883).
