= Józef Bem =

Polish statesman (1794–1850)

Murad Tevfik Pasha
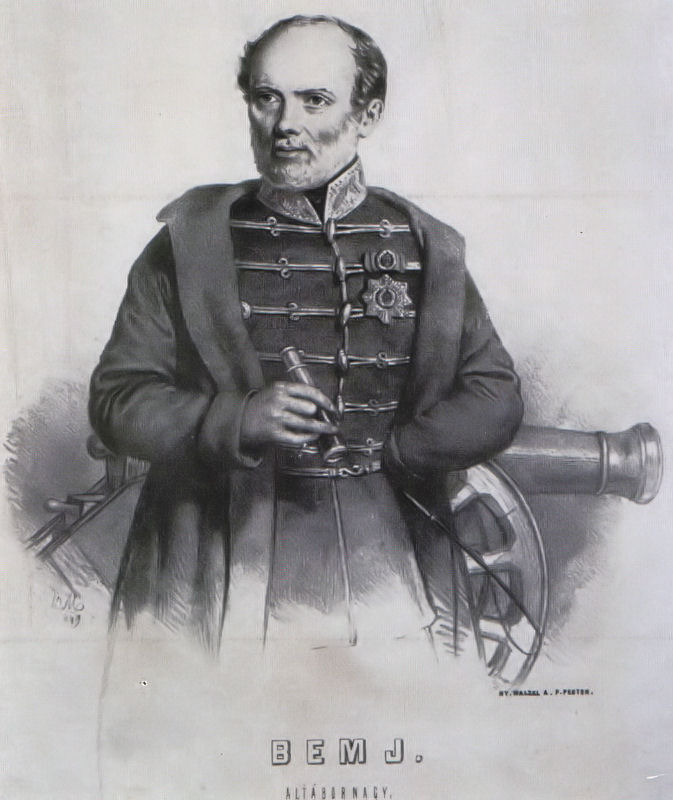
- Born: Józef Zachariasz Bem; 14 March 1794; Tarnów, Kingdom of Galicia and Lodomeria
- Died: 10 December 1850 (aged 56); Aleppo, Ottoman Empire
- Burial place: Tarnów (since 1929)
- Military career
- Allegiance: Polish insurgents Revolutionary Hungarian Army; Ottoman Army
- Rank: General
- Unit: Artillery
- Battles: Napoleonic Wars; Battle of Borodino; November Uprising; Battle of Iganie; Battle of Ostrołęka; Hungarian Revolution of 1848; Battle of Temesvár; Battle of Segesvár; Second Battle of Nagyszeben
- Awards: Virtuti Militari Legion d'honneur Chevalier V class

Józef Zachariasz Bem (14 March 1794 – 10 December 1850; Ottoman Turkish: Murad Tevfik Paşa), was a Polish engineer and general, an Ottoman pasha, a national hero of Poland and Hungary, and a figure intertwined with other European patriotic movements. Like Tadeusz Kościuszko (who fought in the American War of Independence) and Jan Henryk Dąbrowski (who fought alongside Napoleon Bonaparte in Italy and in the French Invasion of Russia), Bem fought outside Poland's borders anywhere his leadership and military skills were needed.

== Early life ==
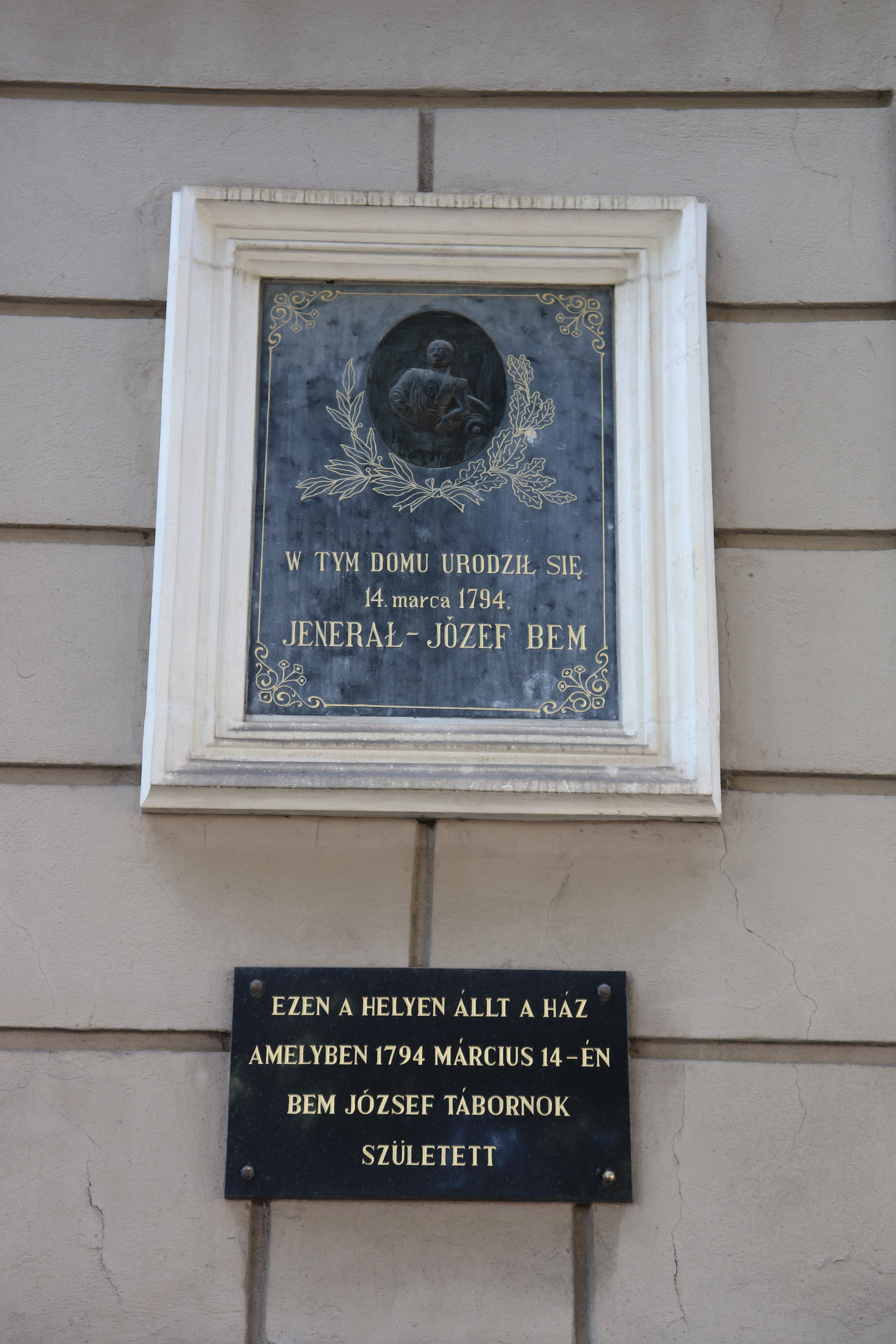
Polish and Hungarian memorial plaques at the birthplace of Józef Bem in Tarnów

Bem family coat of arms

The Behm family hailed from Schweidnitz in Silesia. They moved to Galicia in the 17th century. Józef's grandfather, Adalbert Behm was mayor of the city of Lwów. Bem was born on 14 March 1794 in Tarnów in Galicia, a Habsburg crown land created after the First Partition of Poland. After the creation of the Duchy of Warsaw from the territories captured by Napoleon, he moved with his parents to Kraków, where after finishing military school (where he distinguished himself in mathematics) he joined the ducal forces as a fifteen-year-old cadet. He joined a Polish artillery regiment as a sub-lieutenant and then lieutenant in the French service, took part in the French invasion of Russia (1812), and subsequently distinguished himself in the defence of Danzig (Polish: Gdańsk) (January – November 1813), winning the Knight's Cross of the Legion d'honneur.

After the Congress of Vienna in 1815, the Duchy of Warsaw was transformed into the constitutional Kingdom of Poland, a dependent territory of the Russian Empire, and Bem became a teacher at a military college. There he carried out research on a newly designed rocket-like missile, publishing his research with extensive illustrations.

Bem became involved in a political conspiracy to restore Poland to full independence, but, when his membership in a secret patriotic organisation was discovered, he was demoted and sentenced (in 1822) to one year in prison. Although the sentence was suspended, Bem resigned his commission and moved to Galicia. There he researched steam engines and their application, and again published his results. Bem lived in Lwów and Brody until 1830, and planned on writing a treatise on the subject.

== November Uprising ==
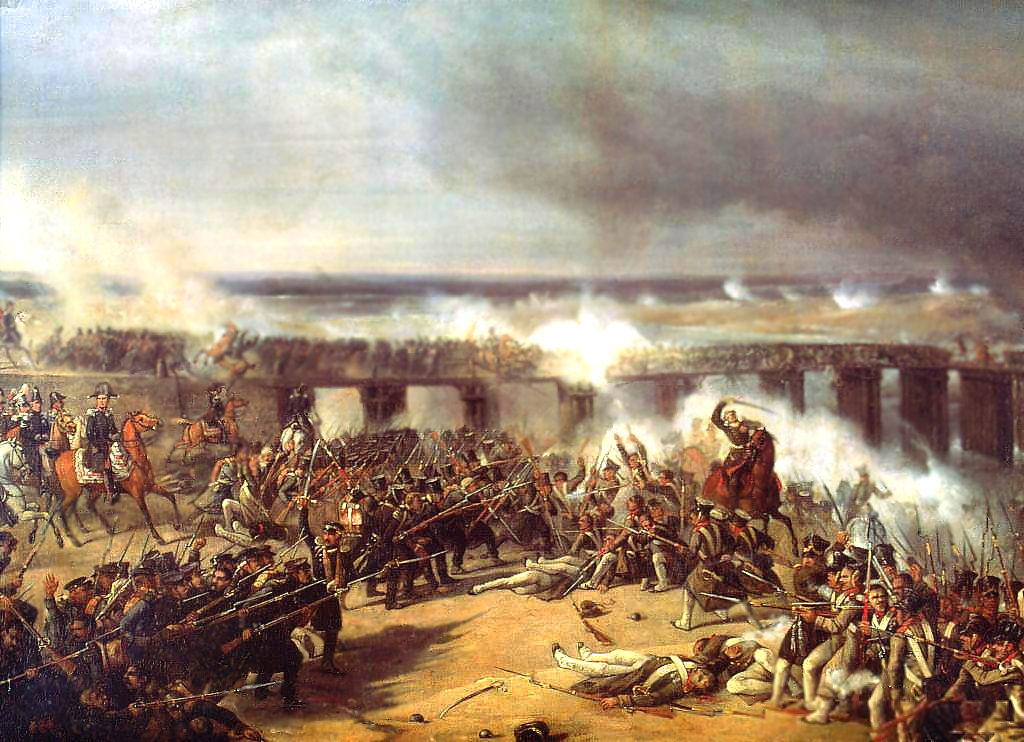
Battle of Ostrołęka (1831) (19th-century painting by Karol Malankiewicz)

When the November Uprising, an insurrection for Polish independence, broke out on 29 November 1830 against the Russian Empire, Bem immediately joined the Polish insurgents. He arrived in Warsaw, was given a major's commission and the command of the 4th Light Cavalry Battalion, which he led during the Battles of Iganie and Ostrołęka. During the Battle of Ostrołęka, Bem's forces bravely charged the Russian opponents. Although the Polish army suffered a serious defeat with a loss of 6,000 men, Bem's actions prevented the destruction of the entire army. For his valour on the battlefield, Bem was awarded the Virtuti Militari Golden Cross and promoted to the rank of Brigadier General. He was steadfastly against capitulation until the very end of the Uprising, during the desperate defence of Warsaw against Prince Paskievich (27 September 1831). Nonetheless, the Polish army was eventually compelled to lay down arms on 5 October 1831, and crossed the Russian–Prussian partitional border under the command of General Maciej Rybiński in the Great Emigration.

== First exile ==
Bem then escaped to Paris, where he supported himself by teaching mathematics. In France, he published his next work, on the national uprising in Poland, in which he not only gave an appraisal of the 1831 insurrection, but also tried to present a programme for the continuation of the struggle for the country's freedom. During his stay in France, he collaborated with the Hôtel Lambert organization and was a member of the Historical and Literary Society.

In 1833, during the Liberal Wars, he went to Portugal to assist the liberal Dom Pedro against the reactionary Dom Miguel, but abandoned the idea when it was found that a Polish legion could not be formed there. While in Portugal he was the target of an assassination attempt carried out by Russian agents.

== 1848 hero ==
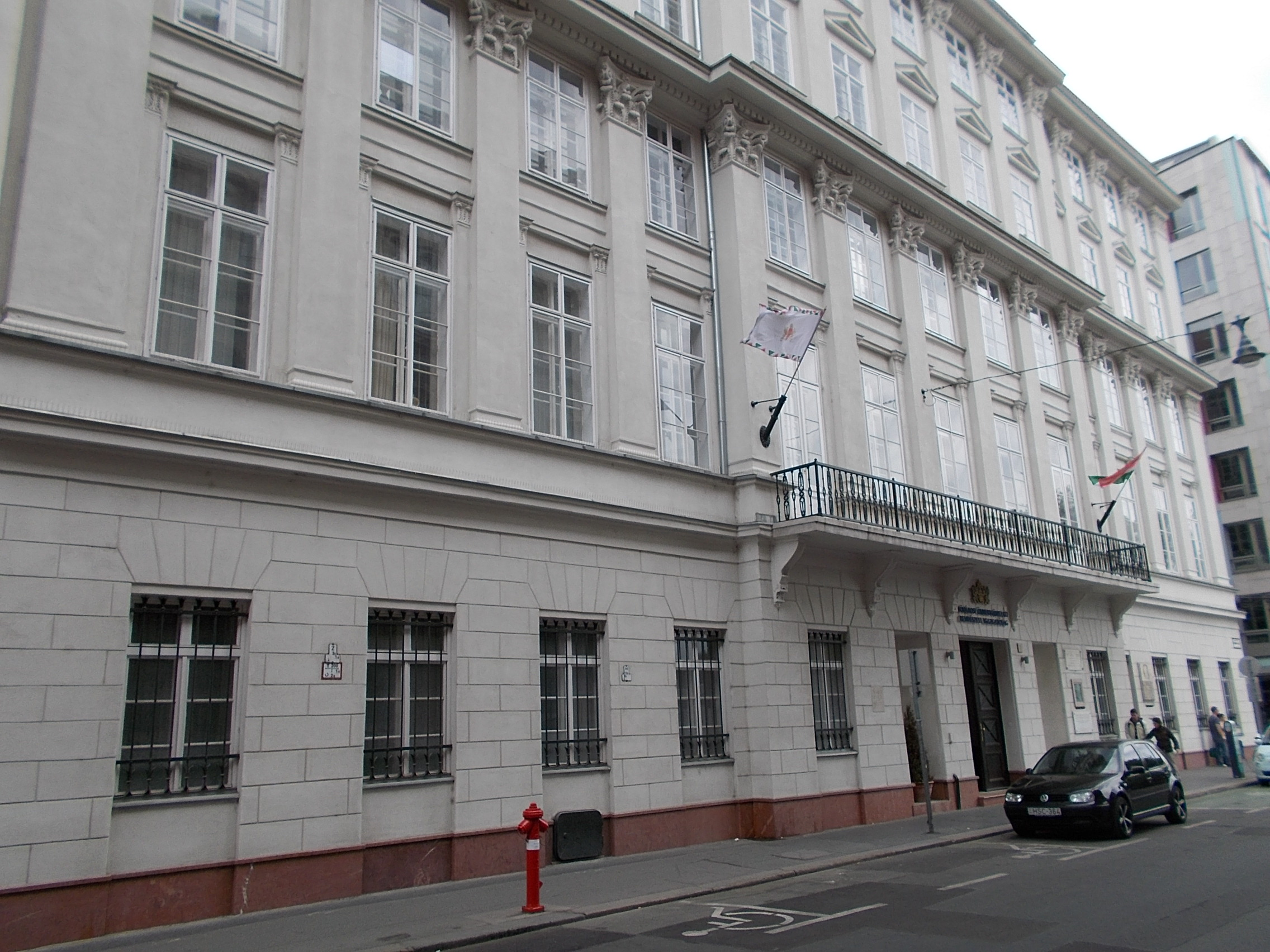
Place of stay of Józef Bem on 9–27 November 1848, Budapest, Hungary

A wider field for his activity presented itself in 1848 due to the Austrian Revolution in the Habsburg Empire. First he attempted to hold Vienna against the imperial troops of Alfred I, Prince of Windisch-Grätz, and, after the capitulation, hastened to Pressburg (Hungarian: Pozsony, today Bratislava, Slovakia) to offer his services to Lajos Kossuth, first defending himself, in a long speech, from the accusations of "treachery to the Polish cause" and "aristocratic tendencies" — which the more fanatical section of the Polish émigré Radicals repeatedly brought against him. He was entrusted with the defence of Transylvania at the end of 1848, and in 1849, as General of the Székely troops, he performed miracles with his little army, notably at the bridge of Piski (now Simeria, Romania) on 9 February, where, after fighting all day, he drove back an immense force of pursuers.

After relieving Transylvania he was sent to drive the Austrian General Anton Freiherr von Puchner out of the Banat region. Bem defeated von Puchner at Orsova on 16 May, but the Russian invasion forced Bem to retreat to Transylvania. From 12 to 22 July Bem was fighting continually, but finally, on 31 July 1849, his army was annihilated by overwhelming numbers in the Battle of Segesvár (now Sighişoara); Bem escaped after feigning death. He fought a fresh action at Nagycsür (now Șura Mare) on 6 August, and contrived to bring his fragmented army to the Battle of Temesvár (now Timișoara), to aid the hard-pressed General Henryk Dembiński. Bem was in command and was seriously wounded in the last pitched battle of the war, fought there on 9 August.

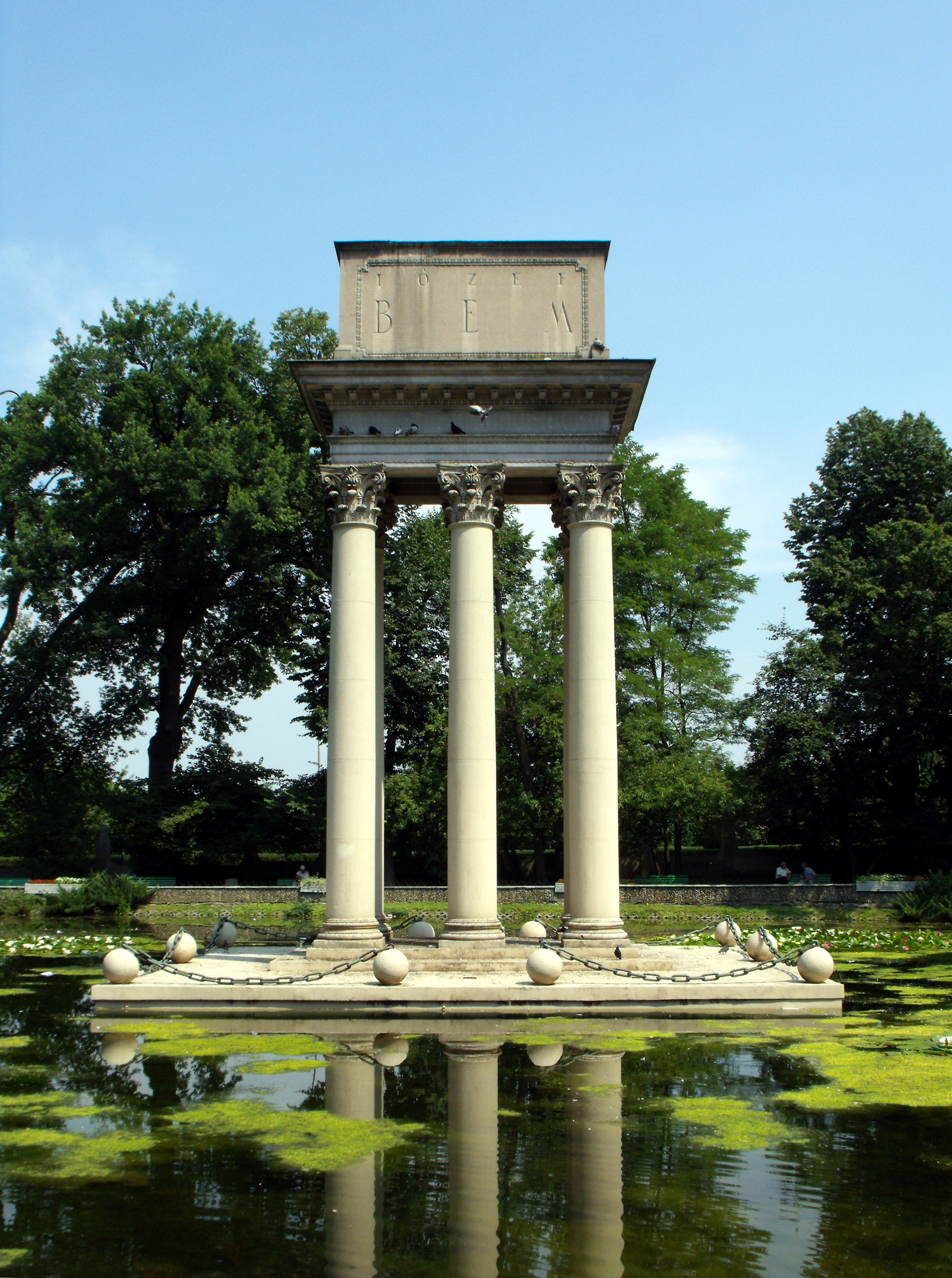
Mausoleum of General Józef Bem in Tarnów

== Second exile and death ==
On the collapse of the rebellion he fled to the Principality of Wallachia, settling in Bucharest, and then in the Ottoman Empire, where he adopted Islam, and served as Governor of Aleppo under the name of Murad Paşa/Pasha. His last military victory was defeating Bedouins sieging the city of Aleppo. On 10 December 1850, he died of malaria.

== Burial and grave ==
Bem was buried in a military cemetery in Aleppo. In 1926 a committee was formed to bring his body back to Poland. His mausoleum was designed by Adolf Szyszko-Bohusz and built on an island in a pond, in Strzelecki Park in Tarnów. Since Bem has converted to Islam, as was required for his career in the Ottoman Empire, he could not be buried in Catholic ground, but the unique design of this mausoleum – a rectangular sarcophagus standing on six Corinthian columns, above ground – made it possible for him to be buried in his hometown. On the longer side walls of the sarcophagus there are inscriptions: Józef Bem on the front, Bem apó, a magyar szabadságharc legnagyobb hadvezére 1848–1849 ("Grandpa Bem, greatest leader of the Hungarian fight for freedom 1848–1849" in Hungarian) on the back. On the shorter side walls فريق مراد باشا ("Lt. General Murat Pasha") is written on one side and the years 1794, 1850 and 1929 (the years of his birth, death and reburial, respectively) on the other.

The mausoleum has been completed in July 1928. Bem was exhumed on 20 June 1929. Before the coffin reached Tarnów, it was displayed to the public at the National Museum in Budapest, and then in the Wawel Castle in Kraków. The funeral ceremony of General Józef Bem in Tarnów took place on 30 June 1929. The next day, the coffin, after being moved to the building of the Rifle Society, was opened for an anthropological research to be carried out. The skull was too fragile to make a plaster cast. On 6 July in the morning, after the construction of a special scaffolding, the coffin was lifted with cranes to the top of the mausoleum and placed in the sarcophagus, and the side wall was bricked up.

== Character and legacy ==
Bem was a man respected for his courage and heroic temper, both of which were in contrast with his small stature. His influence is said to have been magnetic: although none of his Székely subordinates understood the language he spoke, most revered him. As a soldier Bem was remarkable for his excellent handling of artillery and the rapidity of his marches. In Hungarian, he is often referred to affectionately as "Bem apó", which roughly translates into "Grandpa Bem" or "Old Man Bem".

In the 1930s Hungary and Poland each had a regiment of mounted artillery named for him. To date, Bem remains the most famous Muslim in both countries, partly due to his role in the fight for independence in both states.

A statue to his honour was erected at Marosvásárhely (now Târgu-Mureş, Romania) but he lives still more enduringly in the verses of the Hungarian national poet Sándor Petőfi, who fell in the fatal action of 31 July 1849 at the Battle of Segesvár.

The Hungarian Revolution of 1956 (which originally started as a sympathy protest, supporting the Polish Poznań protests) began on 23 October with a protest at the foot of the Bem Statue in Budapest.

== Works ==
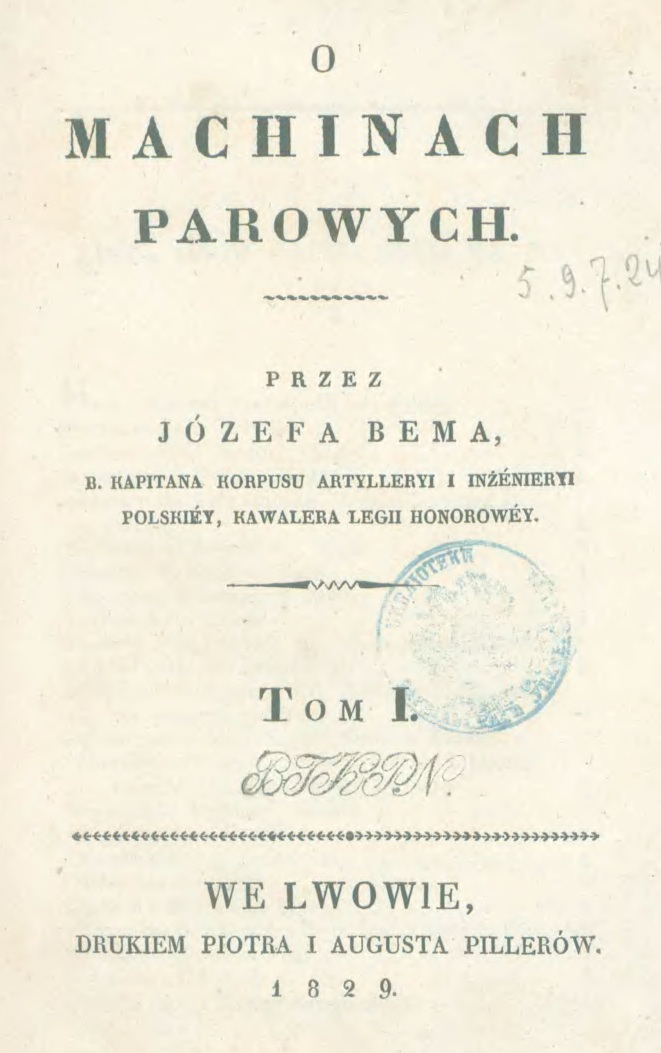
O machinach parowych (On Steam Engines) by Józef Bem, book published in 1829 in Lwów.

Józef Bem also published books in the French, Polish, and German languages about the history of Poland, technology, and military aspects:

- Józef Bem – "La Pologne dans ses anciennes limites et l'empire des Russies" 1836
- Józef Bem - "Notes sur les fusées incendiaires"
- Józef Bem – "Erfahrungen über die Congrevischen Raketen" (Uwagi o rakietach zapalających, Practical Knowledge of Incendiary Rockets) 1820
- Józef Bem – "O machinach parowych" (About Steam Engines)
- Józef Bem – "Węgrzy i Polacy w dzisiejszym stanie Europy" (Hungarians and Poles in Contemporary Europe)
- Józef Bem – "O powstaniu narodowym" (About National Uprising)

== Honors ==
- Three commemorative postage stamps were issued on 10 December 1950 by Hungary on account of his death centenary.
- A souvenir sheet was issued on 10 December 1950 by Hungary on Stamp Day.
- On 15 March 1952 his stamp appears in Heroes of the 1848 Revolution series.
- Poland issued a commemorative postage stamp on 15 July 1948 in Revolution Centenaries series.
- Poland issued postage stamp on 10 December 1950 on his death centenary.

== Gallery ==
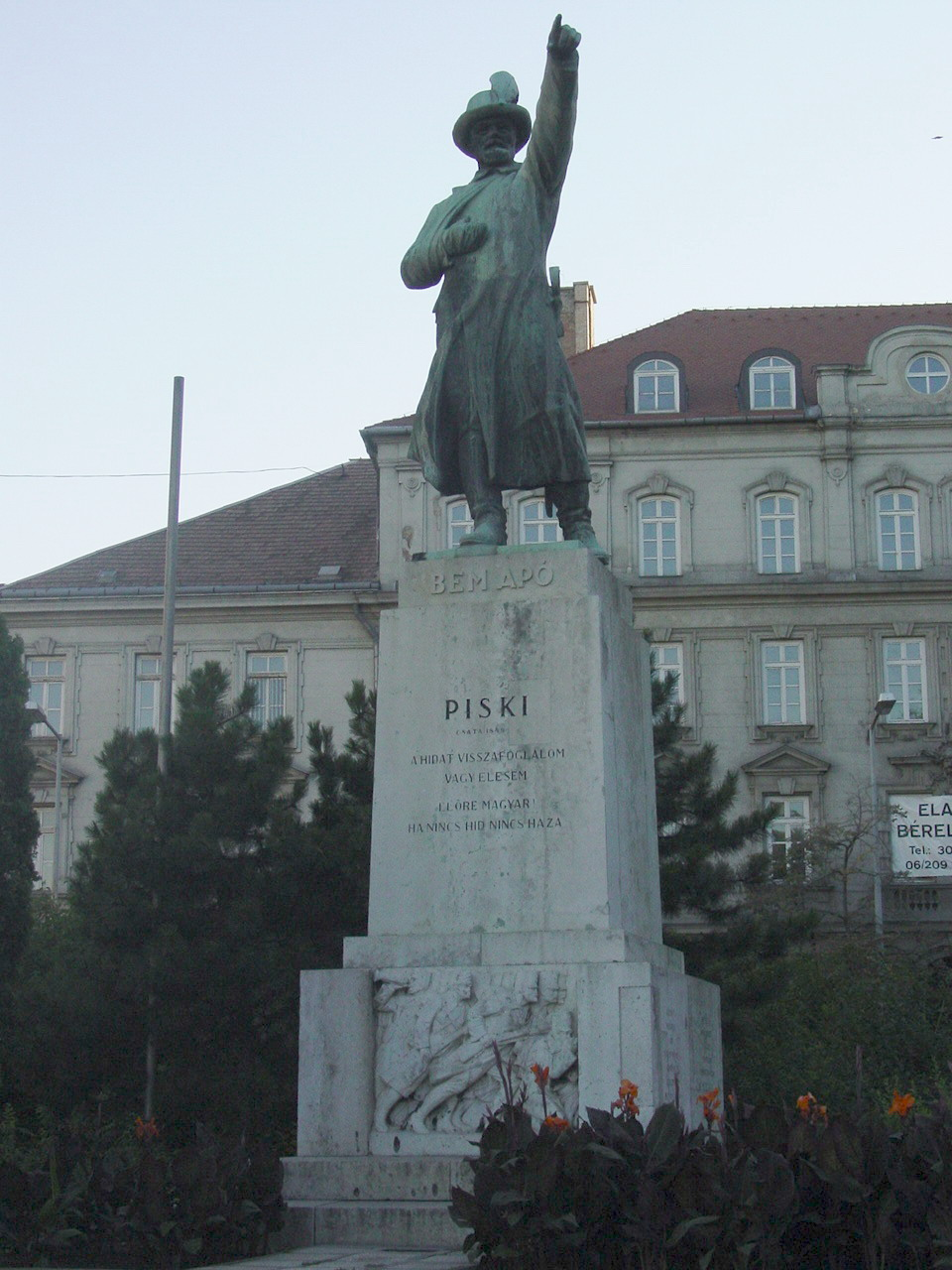
Statue of Józef Bem in Budapest

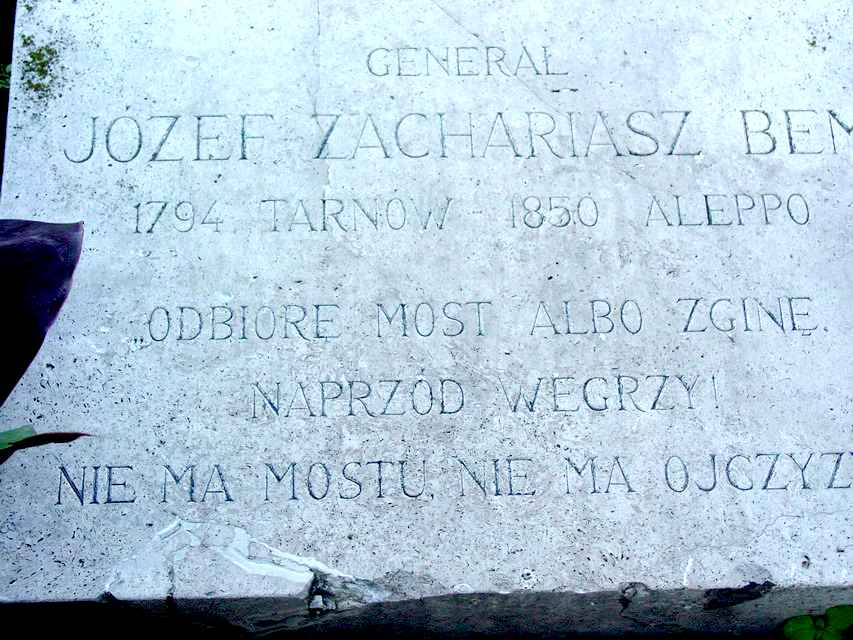
Statue inscription – (I will) retake the bridge or perish, onwards Hungary! With no bridge, there is no fatherland

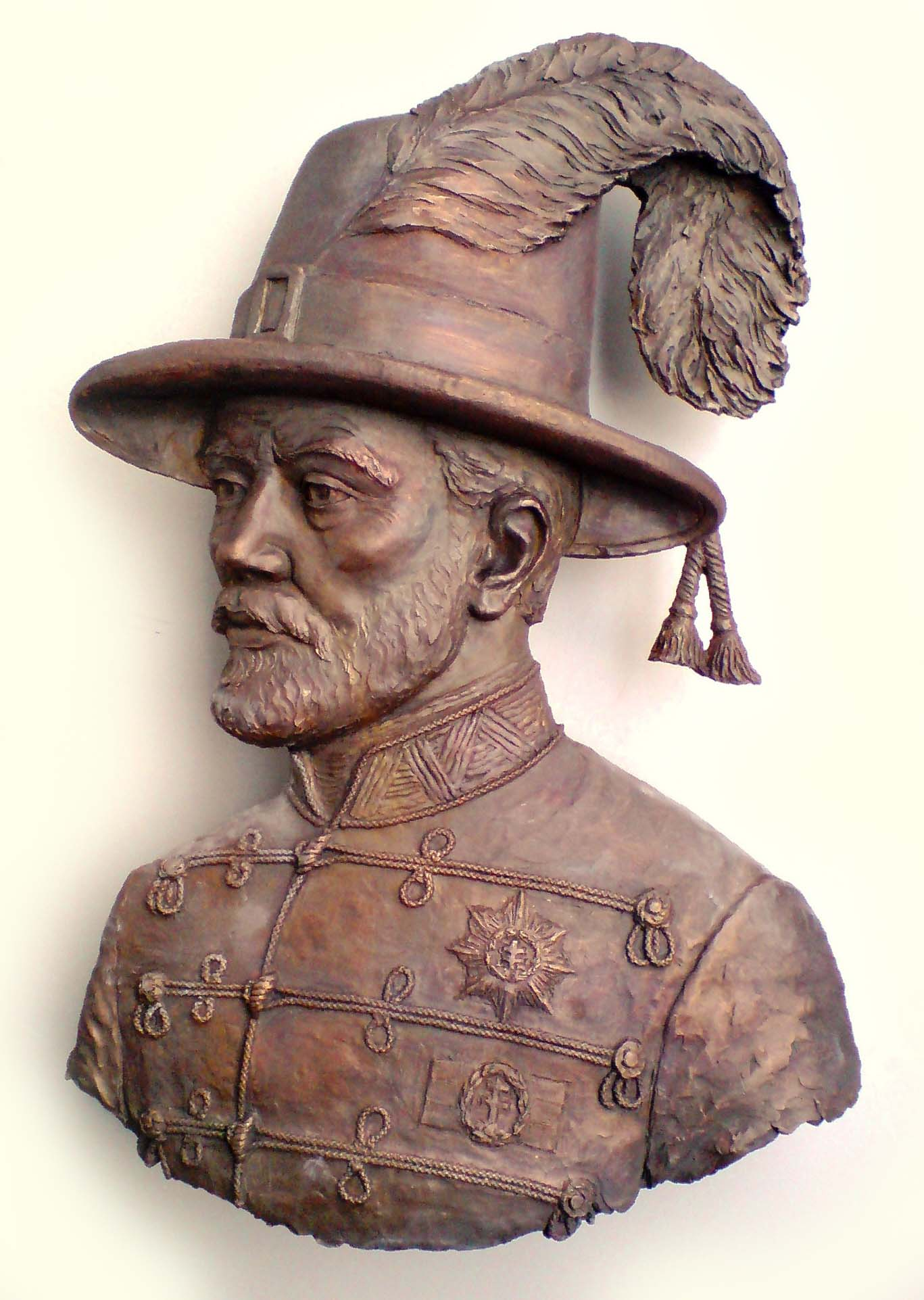
Józef Bem sculpture by Richárd Juha

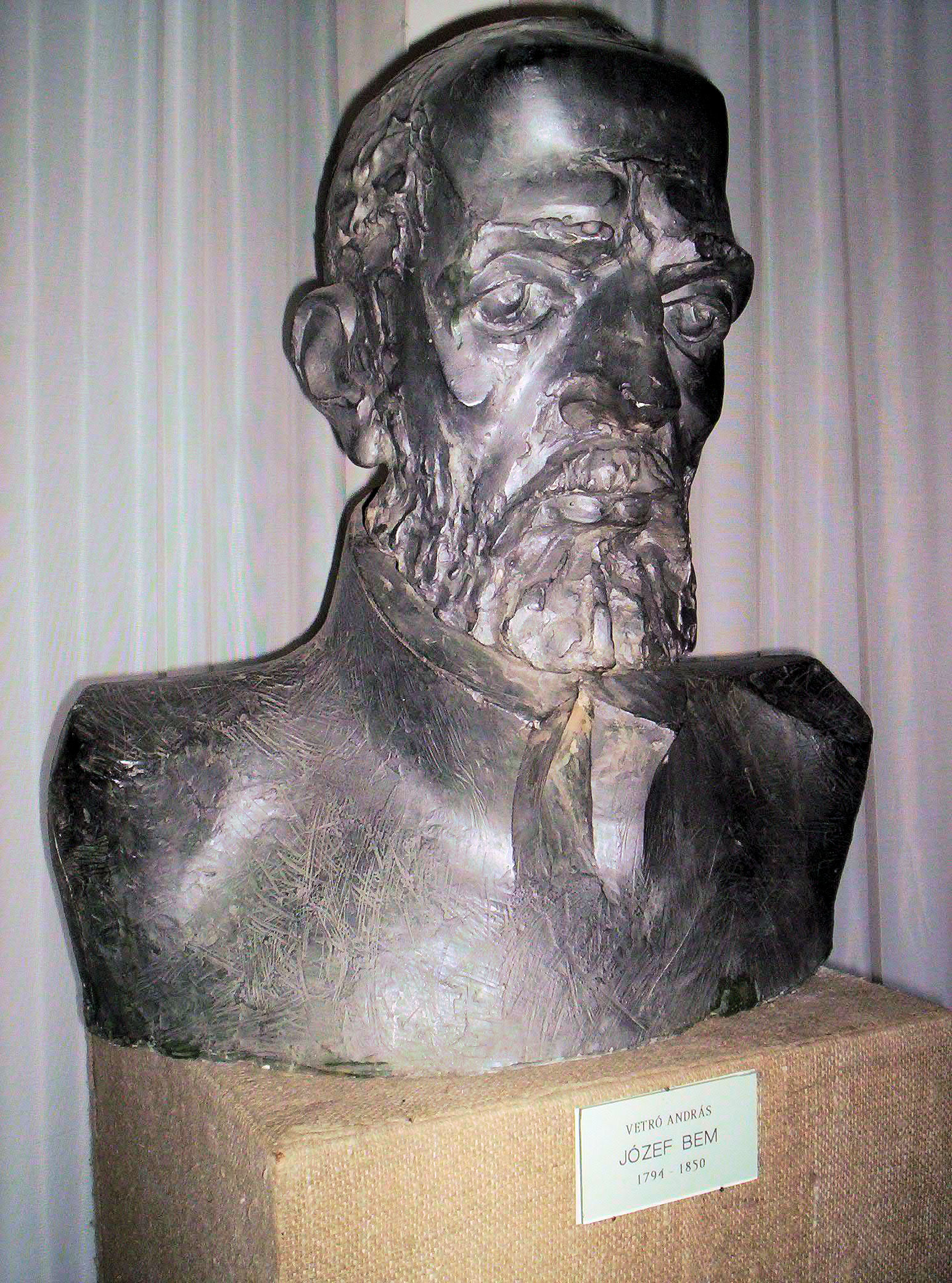
Bust in the Céhtörténeti Múzeum

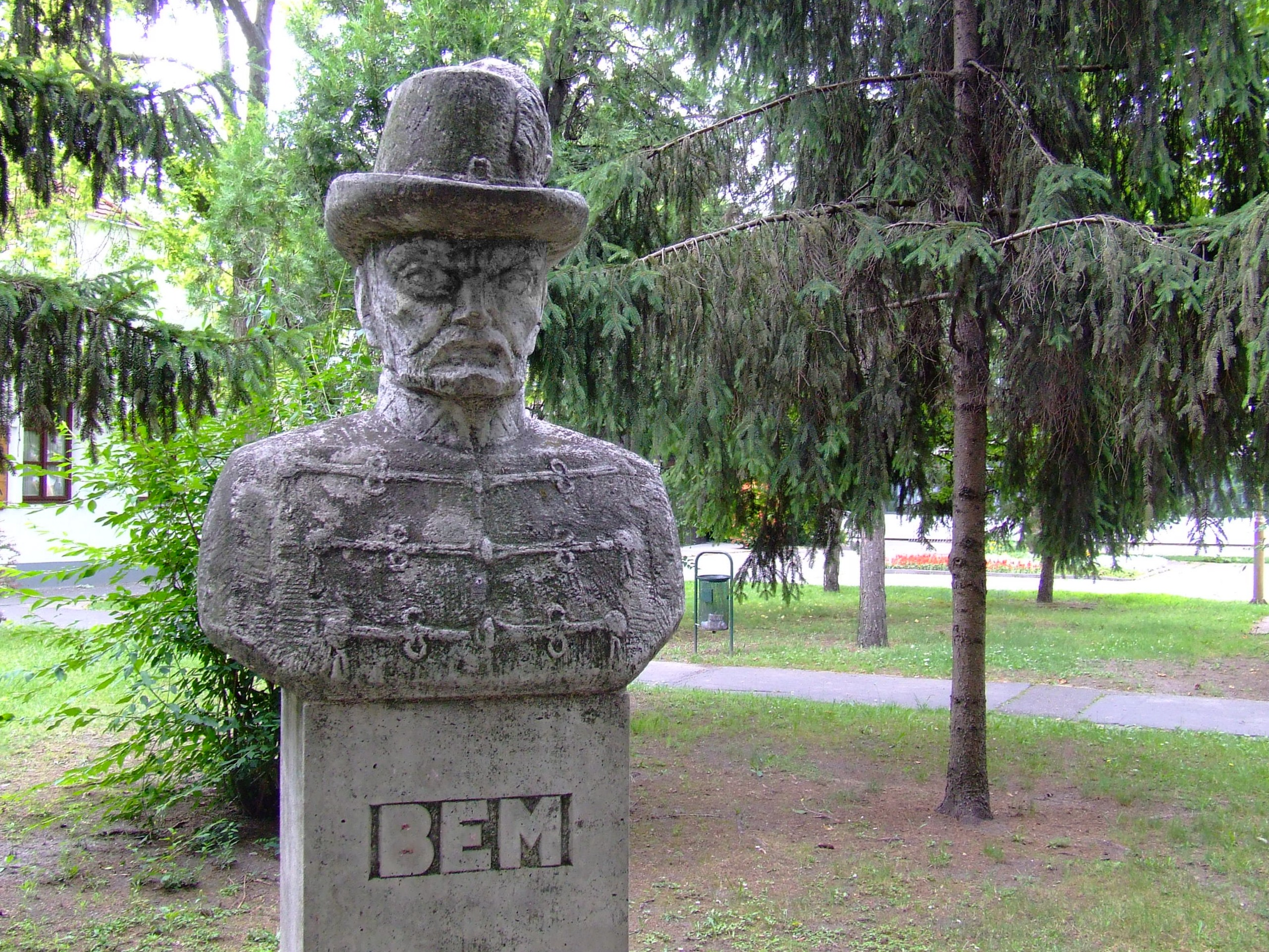
Bust of Józef Bem in Kiskőrös

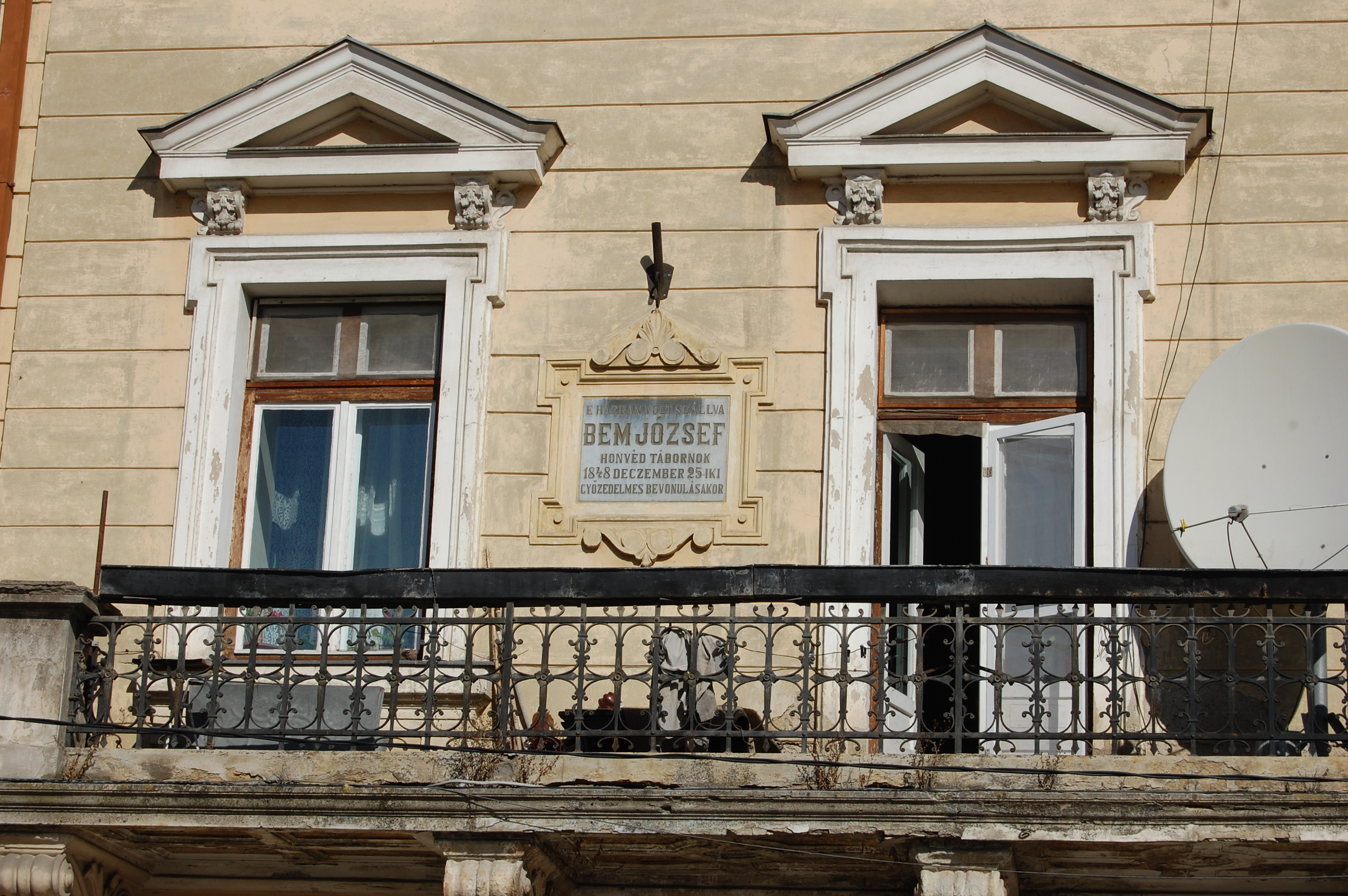
Commemorative plaque, Cluj-Napoca

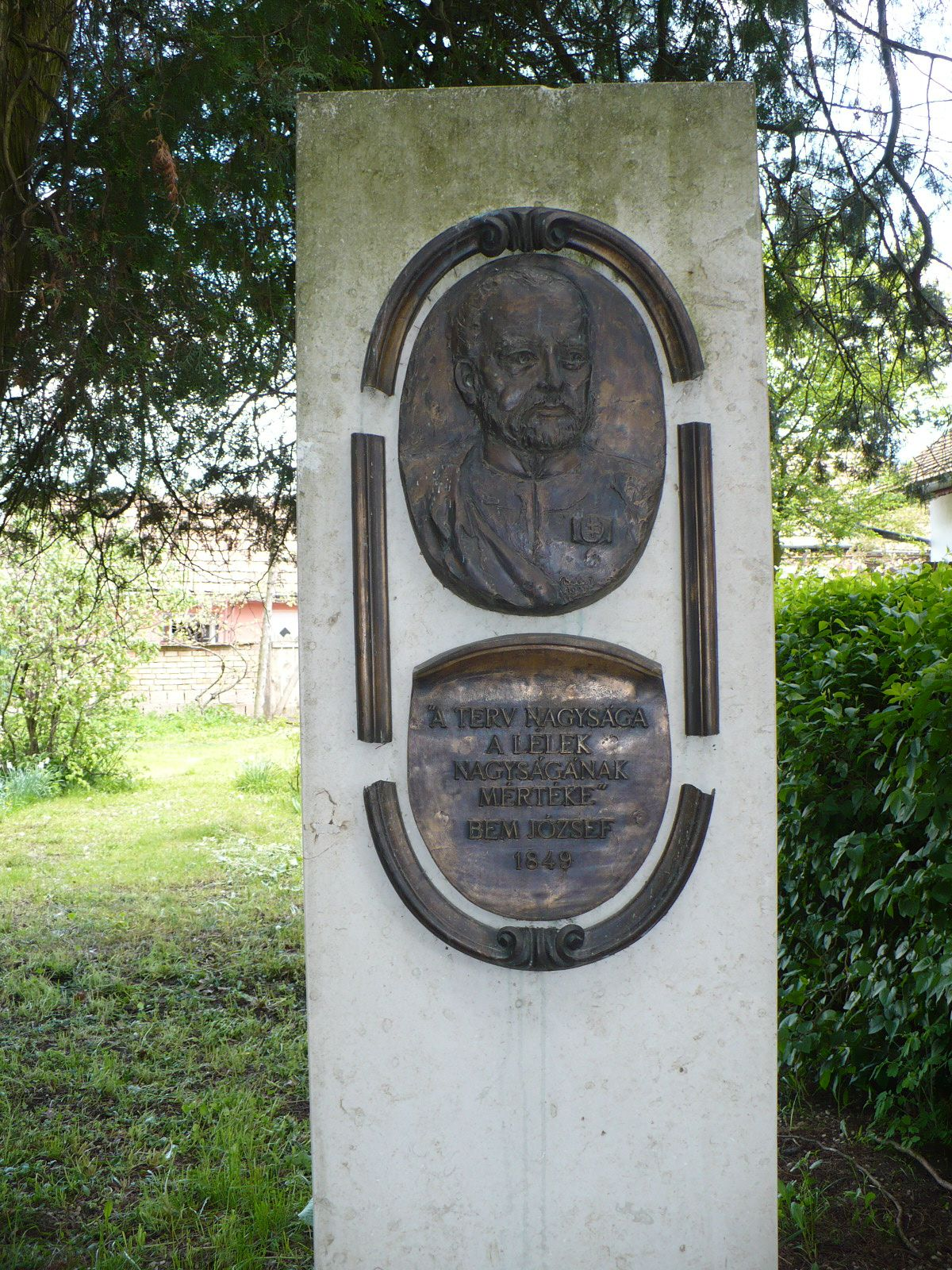
Monument dedicated to Bem, Târgu Mureș

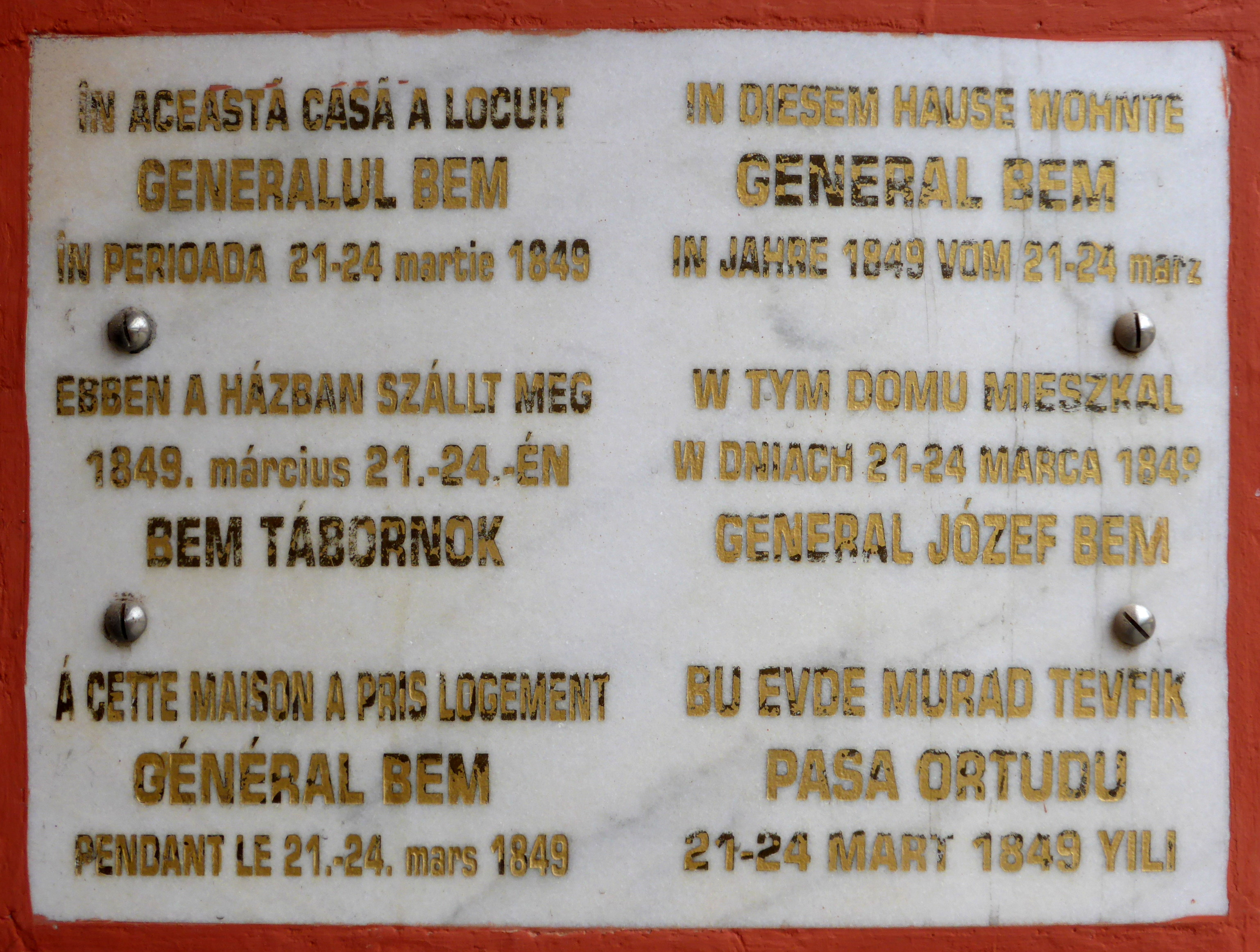
Commemorative plaque, Brasov

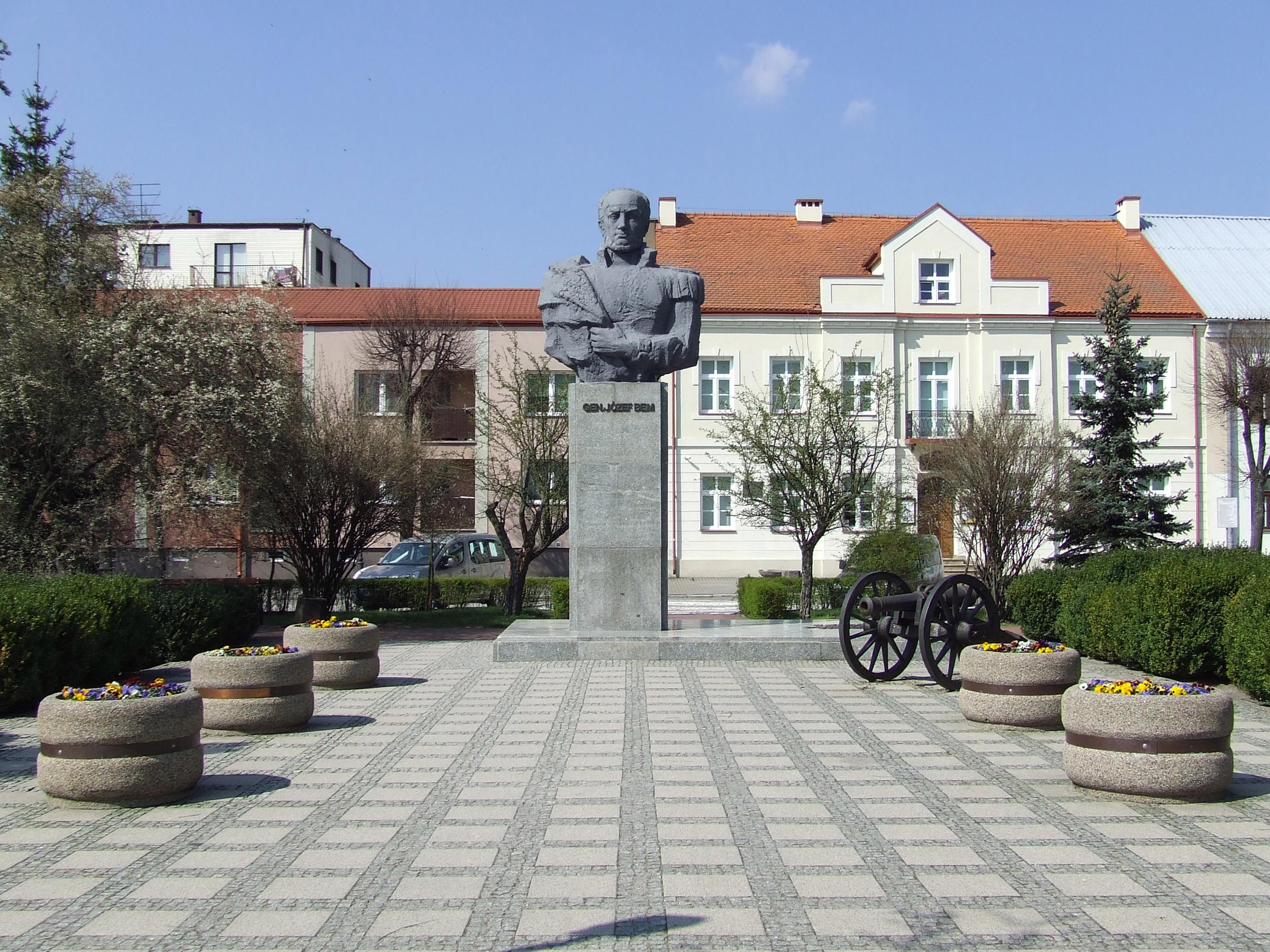
Bust of Józef Bem at the Józef Bem Square (Polish: Plac Bema) in Ostrołęka

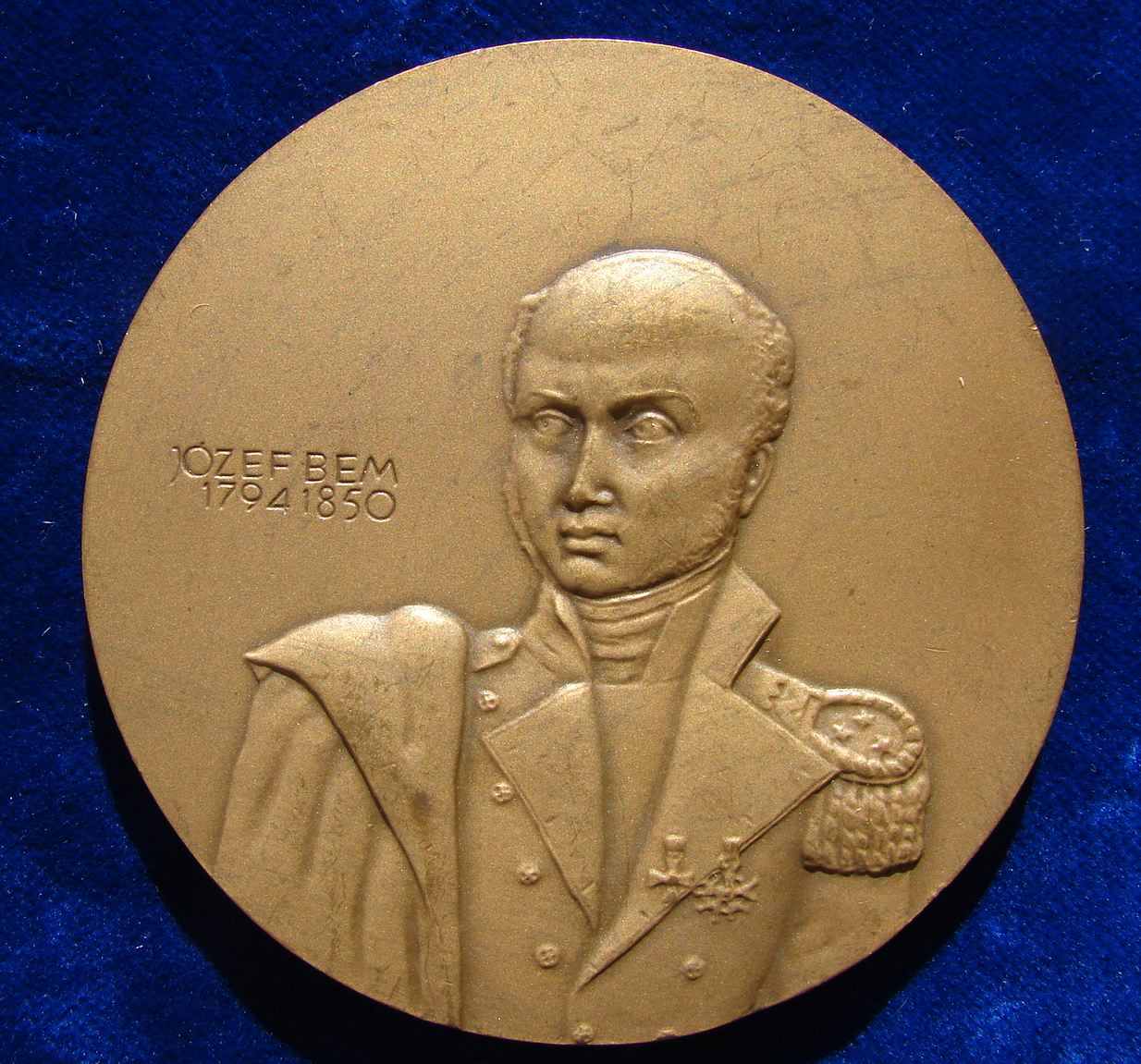
Józef Bem, Polish medallion ND by J. Misztela

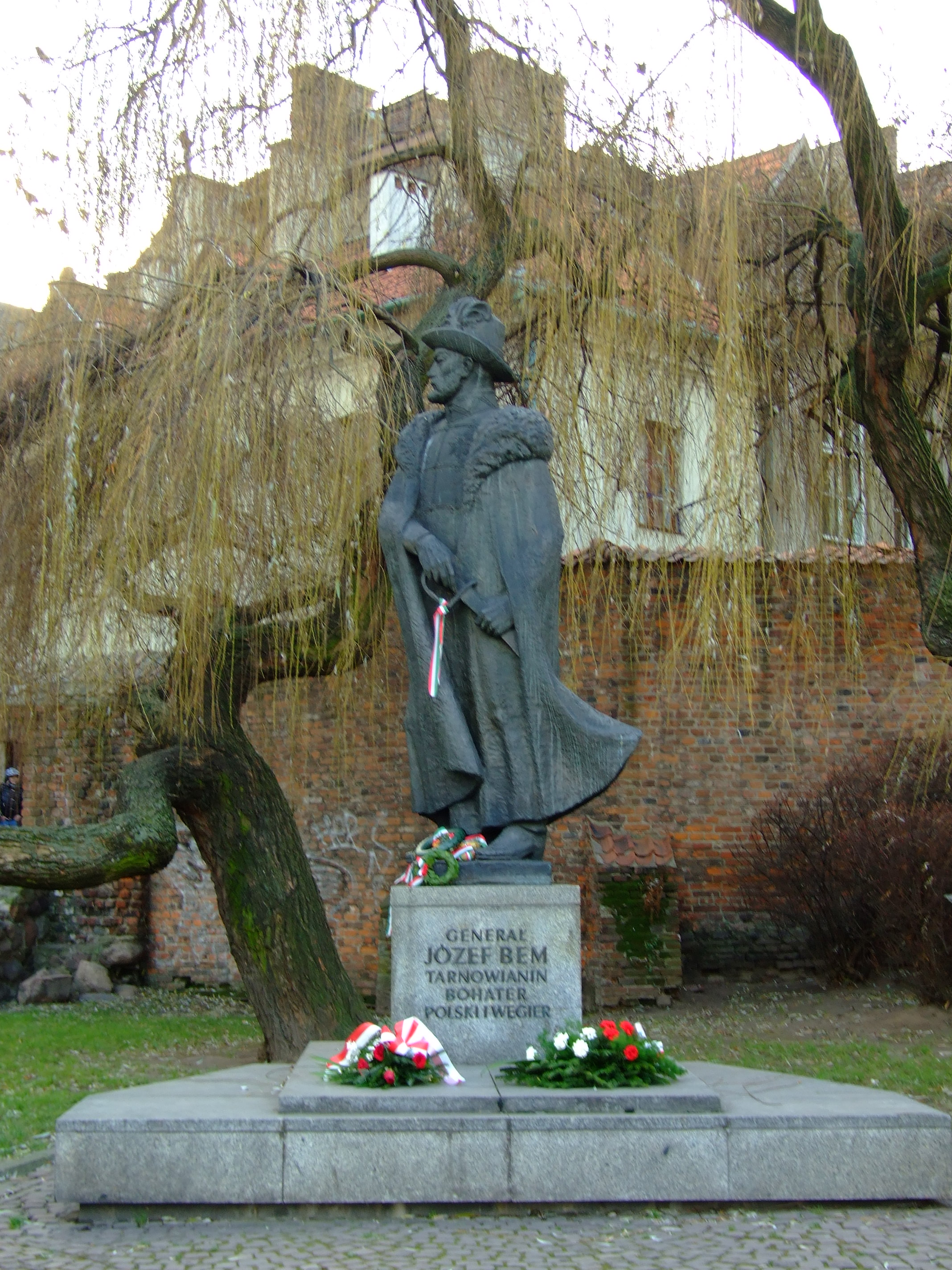
Statue in central Tarnów

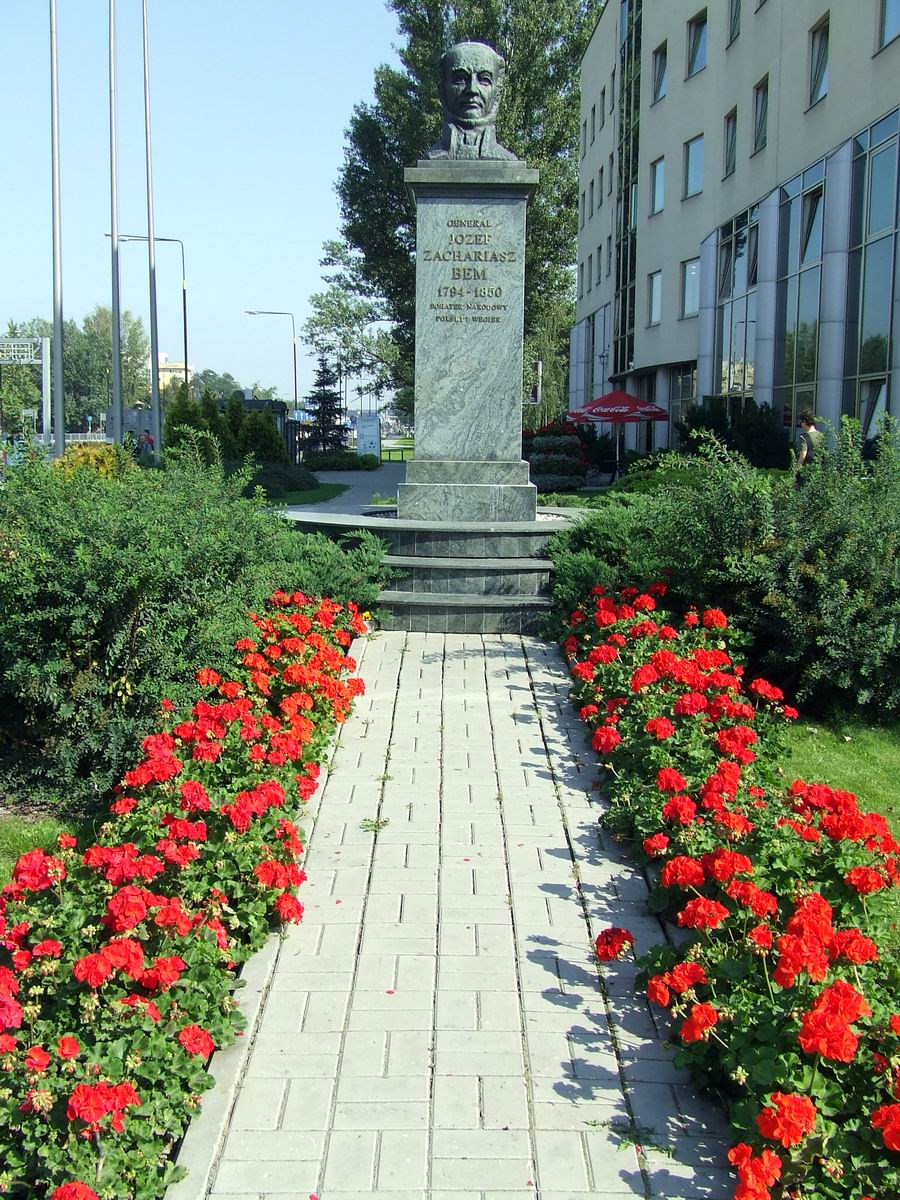
Bem Monument in Warsaw

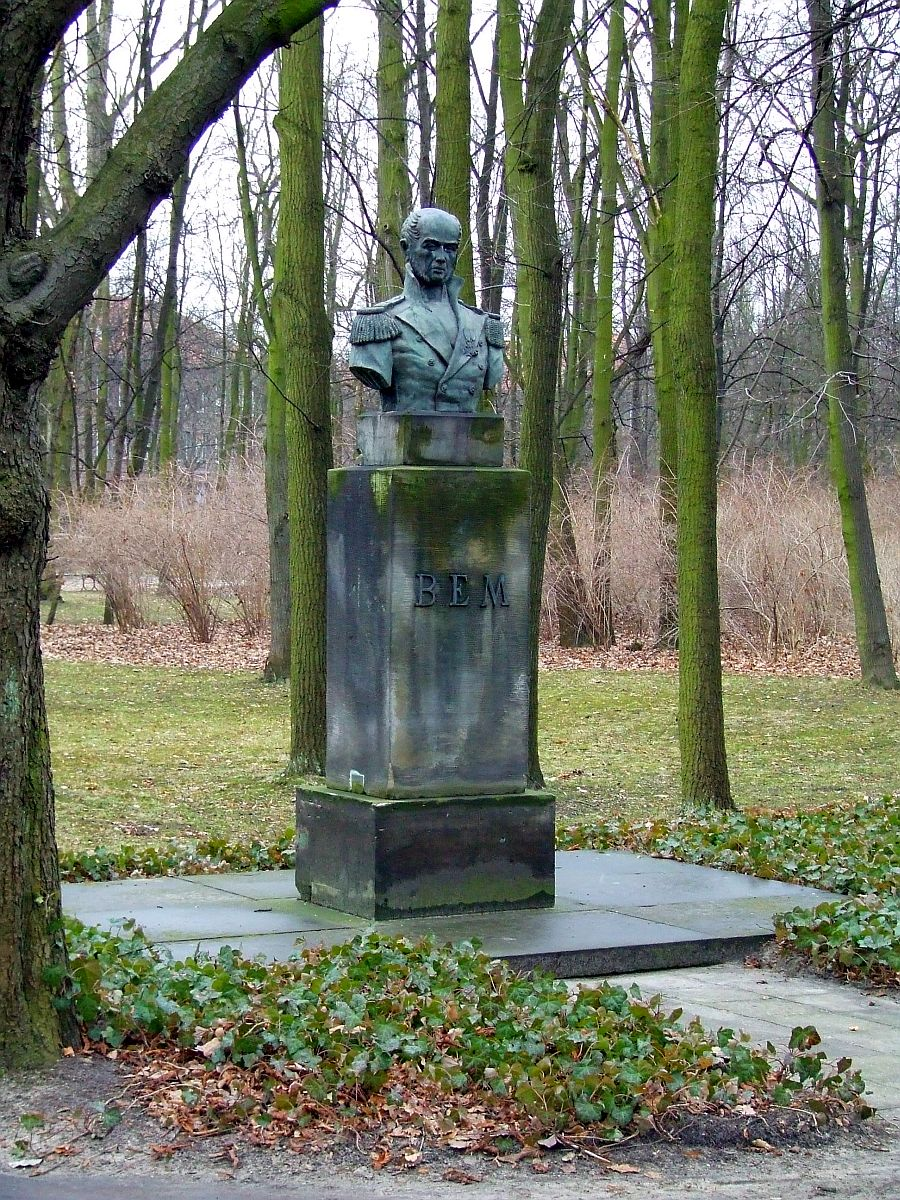
Bem Monument in Łazienki

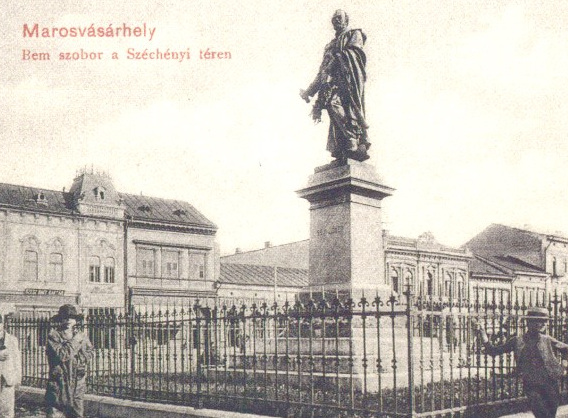
Statue of Bem in Marosvasarhely (Târgu Mureș), demolished after the union of Transylvania with Romania

== In popular culture ==
The great Polish poet Cyprian Norwid, a descendant of Jan III Sobieski, dedicated to Józef Bem the poem Bema pamięci żałobny rapsod (Funeral Rhapsody in Memory of Bem), which was subsequently used by other artists including Zbigniew Herbert and Czesław Niemen.

Since 1969 Czesław Niemen's Bema pamięci żałobny rapsod (Mourner's Rhapsody in Memory of Bem) became cult status in Central Europe and also beyond the Iron Curtain.

In 1974 an English version was re-recorded with the help of Michał Urbaniak, John Abercrombie, Jan Hammer, Rick Laird and Don Grolnick, which was published worldwide by CBS Records International.

In 1977 the Bema pamięci żałobny rapsod (Mourner's Rhapsody in Memory of Bem) intro from the 1970 initial issue was bootlegged by the West German rock band Jane as intro and reprise intro for the second side of their elegic Krautrock album Between Heaven and Hell also immediately achieving golden record status.

Józef Bem's descendants are present mainly among artists and in music related business in Poland and in exile and include the jazz singer Ewa Bem and her brothers Aleksander Bem and the jazz guitarist Jarosław Bem.

== See also ==
- History of Poland
- Poland-Hungary relations

== Sources ==
- "Бем, Иосиф" . Brockhaus and Efron Encyclopedic Dictionary (in Russian). 1906.
