= A Funeral Rhapsody in Memory of General Bem =

Poem by Cyprian Norwid

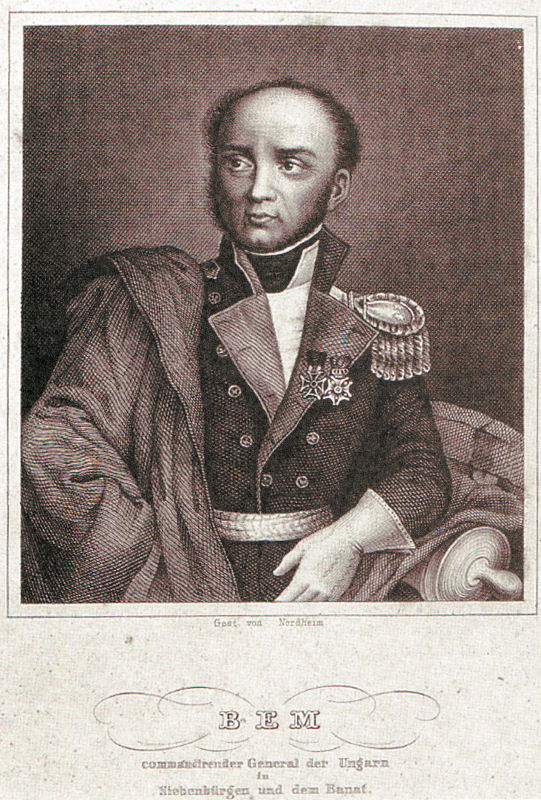
Józef Bem as Hungarian commander-in-chief

"A Funeral Rhapsody in Memory of General Bem" (in Polish Bema pamięci żałobny rapsod) is a poem by Polish poet Cyprian Norwid, a descendant of the Polish king John III Sobieski. It is an elegy for a famous Polish commander, Józef Bem, who was a hero of three nations, Polish, Hungarian and Turkish. It was written in 1851. The poem is a description of an imaginary funeral. It is described as a funeral of a medieval knight or Slavic warrior, encased in armour, with his horse and a falcon, accompanied by groups of boys and girls. The poem is especially interesting because of its form. It was written in rhymed hexameter. All the lines are made up of fifteen (7+8) syllables according to the pattern ' x ' x x ' x || ' x x ' x x ' x.

The rhapsody opens with a Latin citation of Hannibal:

iusiurandum patri datum usque ad hanc diem ita servavi

(The oath given to father I have kept even unto this day)

Norwid's poem was often used and performed by Zbigniew Herbert and was translated into English by Adam Czerniawski.

== In popular culture ==
Mourner's Rhapsody was sung by Czesław Niemen and published in 1970 in Poland (Niemen: Enigmatic). In 1974 supported by John Abercrombie, Michał Urbaniak and some members of the Mahavishnu Orchestra the rhapsody was published by CBS Records International (Niemen: Mourner's Rhapsody).

Intro of the 1970 Polish release was also bootlegged in 1977 by a German band Jane on their album Between Heaven and Hell.

== Bibliography ==
Cyprian Kamil Norwid, Poezje. Poems. Selection, translation and afterword by Adam Czerniawski, Wydawnictwo Literackie, Kraków 1986, ISBN 83-08-01469-0.
