= Cyprian Kamil Norwid =

Polish poet (1821–1883)

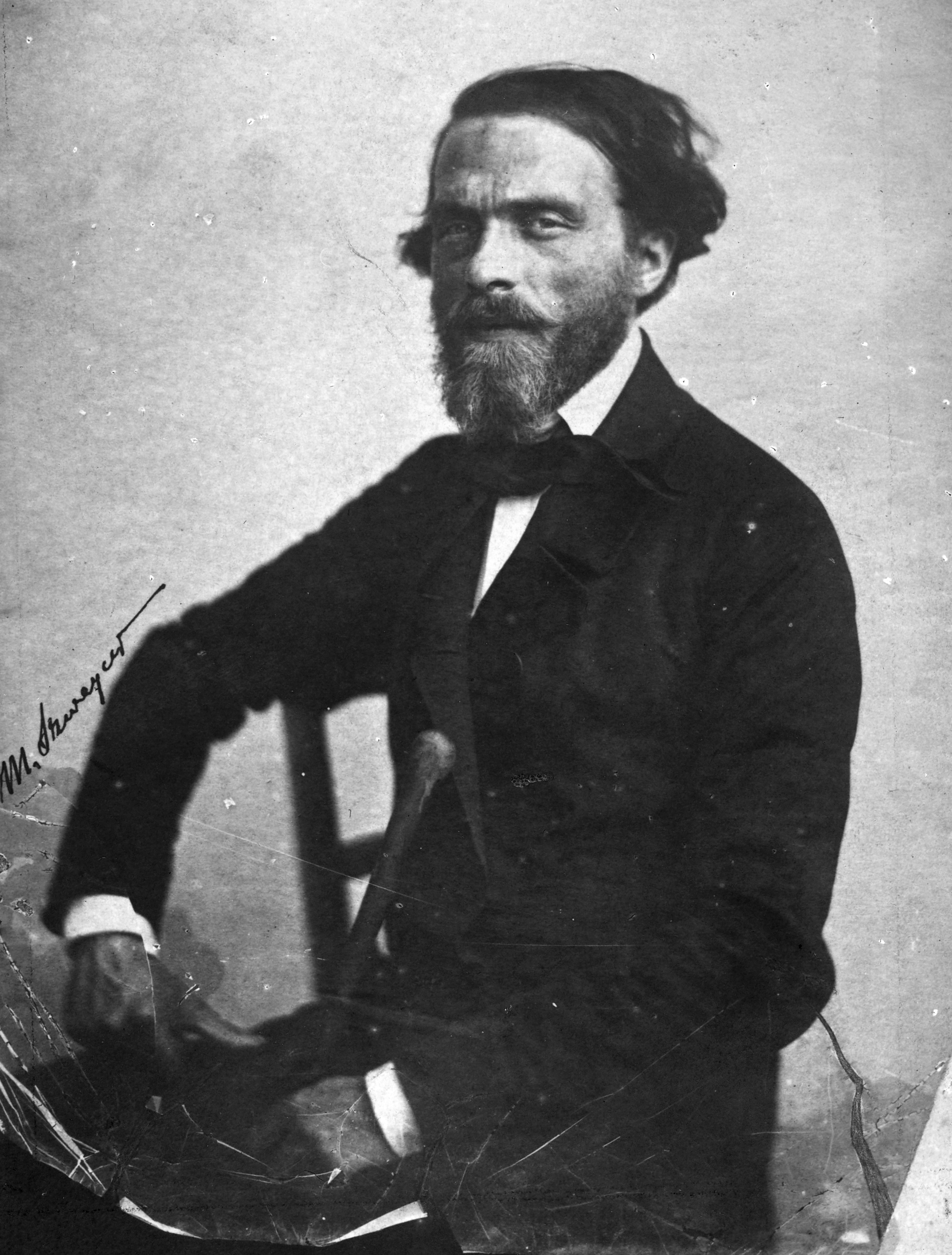
- Norwid in 1871
- Born: 24 September 1821; Laskowo-Głuchy, Congress Poland
- Died: 23 May 1883 (aged 61); Paris, French Third Republic
- Occupations: Poet; essayist
- Relatives: Ludwik Norwid (brother)
- Writing career
- Language: Polish
- Period: 1840–1883
- Genres: Romanticism; modernism
- Notable works: Vade-mecum; Promethidion; Ad leones!

Cyprian Ksawery Gerard Walenty Norwid (24 September 1821 – 23 May 1883), better known as Cyprian Kamil Norwid (Polish: [ˈt͡sɘ̟.prjan ˈka.mil ˈnɔr.vit]), was a Polish poet, dramatist, painter, sculptor, and philosopher. He is now considered one of the four most important Polish Romantic poets, though scholars still debate whether he is more aptly described as a late romantic or an early modernist.

Norwid led a tragic, often poverty-stricken life. He experienced mounting health problems, unrequited love, harsh critical reviews, and increasing social isolation. For most of his life he lived abroad, having left Polish lands in his twenties. Having briefly travelled across Western Europe in his youth, and briefly travelling to the United States, where he worked as an illustrator, he lived chiefly in Paris, where he eventually died.

Considered a "rising star" in his youth, Norwid's original, nonconformist style was not appreciated in his lifetime. Partly due to this, he was excluded from high society. His work was rediscovered and appreciated only after his death by the Young Poland movement of the late-nineteenth and early-twentieth centuries. Today his most influential work is considered to be Vade-mecum, a vast anthology of verse he finished in 1866. Much of his work, including Vade-mecum, remained unpublished during his lifetime.

== Life ==
=== Youth ===
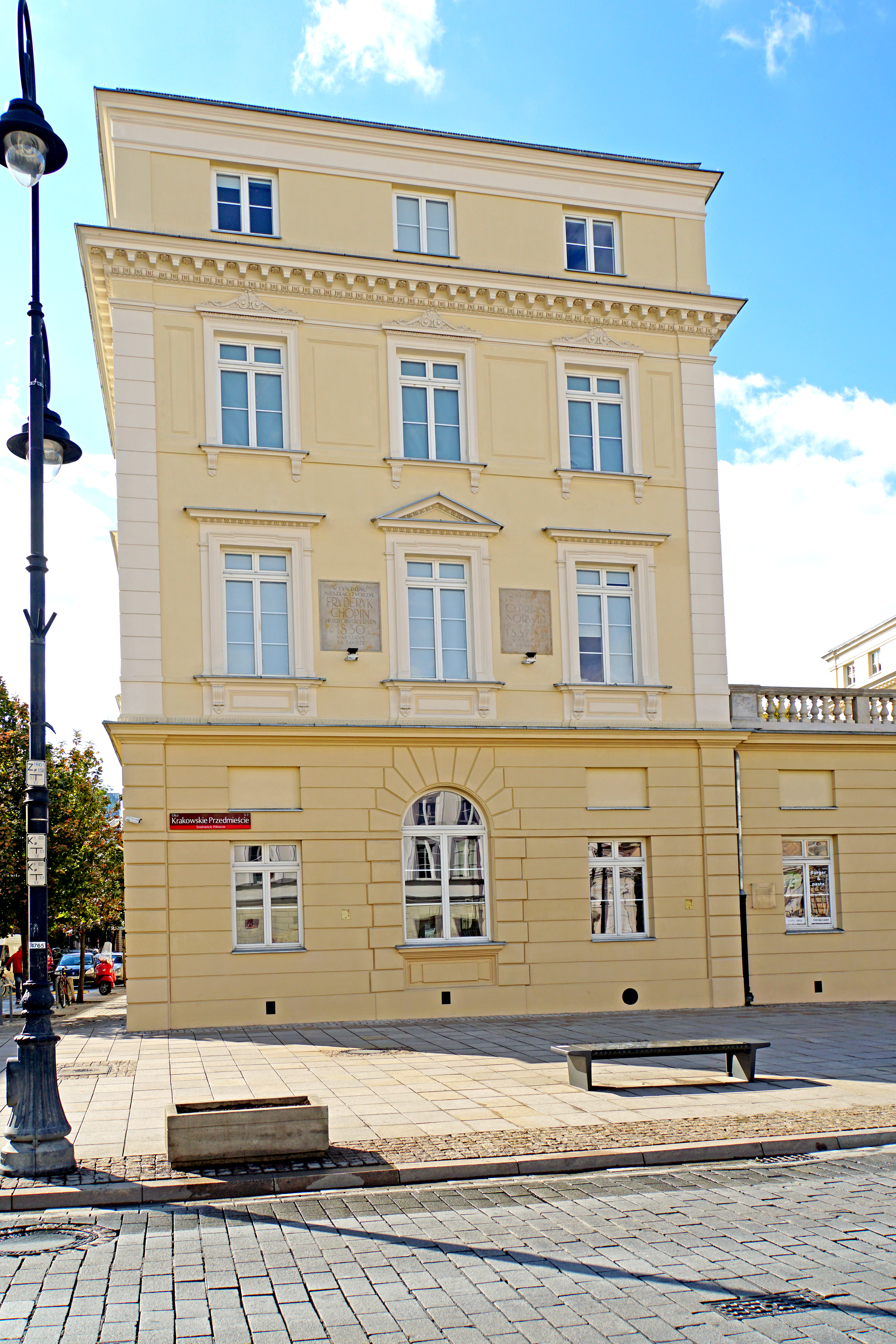
South annex of Czapski Palace (Krakowskie Przedmieście 5, Warsaw), where Chopin lived to 1830. In 1837–39 Norwid studied painting here.

Cyprian Kamil Norwid was born on 24 September 1821 into a family of Polish–Lithuanian minor nobility bearing the Topór coat of arms, in the Masovian village of Laskowo-Głuchy near Warsaw. His father was a minor government official. One of his maternal ancestors was the King of Poland and Grand Duke of Lithuania John III Sobieski.

Cyprian Kamil Norwid and his brother Ludwik Norwid were orphaned early. His mother died when Cyprian was four years old, and in 1835 his father also died: Norwid was 14 at the time. For most of their childhood, Cyprian and his brother were educated at Warsaw schools. In 1836 Norwid interrupted his schooling (not having completed the fifth grade) and entered a private school of painting, studying under Aleksander Kokular and Jan Klemens Minasowicz. His incomplete formal education forced him to become an autodidact, and eventually he learned a dozen languages.

Norwid's first foray into the literary sphere occurred in the periodical Piśmiennictwo Krajowe, which published his first poem, Mój ostatni sonet (My Last Sonnet), in 1840s issue 8. That year he published ten poems and one short story. His early poems were well received by critics and he became a welcome guest at the literary salons of Warsaw; his personality of that time is described as that of a "dandy" and a "rising star" of the young generation of Polish poets. In 1841–1842 he travelled through the Congress Poland with Władysław Wężyk.

=== Europe ===
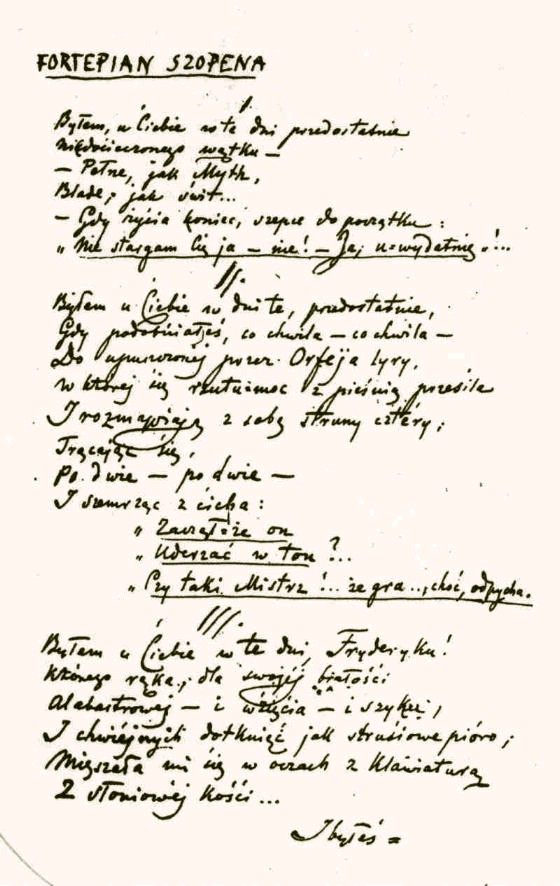
Manuscript of "Chopin's Piano"

In 1842 Norwid received inheritance funds as well as a private scholarship to study sculpture and left Poland, never to return. First he went to Dresden in Germany. He later also visited Venice and Florence in Italy; in Florence he signed up for a course in sculpture at the Accademia di Belle Arti di Firenze. His visit to Verona resulted in a well-received poem W Weronie (In Verona) published several years later. After he settled in Rome in 1844, where for several years he became a regular at Caffè Greco, his fiancée Kamila broke off their engagement. Later he met Maria Kalergis, née Nesselrode; they became acquaintances, but his courtship of her, and later, of her lady-in-waiting, Maria Trebicka, ended in failure. The poet then travelled to Berlin, where he participated in university lectures and meetings with local Polonia. It was a time when Norwid made many new social, artistic and political contacts. At that time he also lost his Russian passport, and after he refused to join the Russian diplomatic service, the Russian authorities confiscated his estate. He was also arrested for trying to cross back to Russia without his passport, and his short stay in Berlin prison resulted in partial deafness. After being forced to leave Prussia in 1846, Norwid went to Brussels. During the European Revolutions of 1848, he stayed in Rome, where he met fellow Polish intellectuals Adam Mickiewicz and Zygmunt Krasiński.

During 1849–1852, Norwid lived in Paris, where he met fellow Poles Frédéric Chopin and Juliusz Słowacki, as well as other emigree artists such as Russians Ivan Turgenev and Alexander Herzen, and other intellectuals such as Jules Michelet (many at Emma Herwegh's salon). Financial hardship, unrequited love, political misunderstandings, and a negative critical reception of his works put Norwid in a dire situation. He lived in poverty, sometimes forced to work as a simple manual laborer. He also suffered from progressive blindness and deafness, but still managed to publish some content in the Polish-language Parisian publication Goniec polski and similar venues. 1849 saw several of his poems published, those included among others his Pieśń społeczna (Social Song). Some of his other notable works from that period include the drama Zwolon and the philosophical poem-treaty about the nature of art, Promethidion, both published in 1851. Promethidion, a long treatise on aesthetics in verse, has been called "the first important piece of Norwid's writing". It was, however, not well received by contemporary critics. That year also saw him finishing the manuscripts for the dramas Krakus and Wanda and the poem Bema pamięci żałobny rapsod (A Funeral Rhapsody in Memory of General Bem).

=== United States ===
Norwid decided to emigrate to the United States in the Fall of 1852, receiving some sponsorship from Wladysław Zamoyski, a Polish nobleman and philanthropist. On 11 February 1853, after a harrowing journey, he arrived in New York City aboard the Margaret Evans, and he held a number of odd jobs there, including at a graphics firm. He was involved in the creation of the memorial album of the Crystal Palace Exhibition and the Exhibition of the Industry of All Nations. By autumn, he learned about the outbreak of the Crimean War. This, as well as his disappointment with America, which he felt lacked "history", made him consider a return to Europe, and he wrote to Mickiewicz and Herzen, asking for their assistance.

=== Back in Paris ===
During April 1854, Norwid returned to Europe with Prince Marceli Lubomirski. He lived in England and with Krasiński's help he was finally able to return to Paris by December that year. Over the next few years Norwid was able to publish several works, such as the poem Quidam. Przypowieść (Quidam. A Story, 1857) and stories collected in Czarne kwiaty (Black Flowers) and Białe kwiaty (White Flowers), published in Czas in 1856–1857. He gave a well-received series of six lectures on Juliusz Słowacki in 1860, published the next year. 1862 saw the publication of some of his poems in an anthology Poezje (Poems) at Brockhaus in Leipzig. (Note: The volume was published in 1862 but with a printed date of 1863.) He took a very keen interest in the outbreak of the 1863 January Uprising (a Polish–Lithuanian revolt against the Russian Empire). Although he could not participate personally due to his poor health, Norwid hoped to personally influence the outcome of the event by establishing a newspaper or magazine; that project however did not come to fruition. His 1865 Fortepian Szopena (Chopin's Piano) is seen as one of his works reacting to the January Uprising. The poem's theme is the Russian troops' 1863 defenestration of Chopin's piano from the music school Norwid attended in his youth.

Norwid continued writing, but most of his work met with little recognition. He grew to accept this, and even wrote in one his works that "the sons pass by this writing, but you, my distant grandchild, will read it... when I'll be no more" (Klaskaniem mając obrzękłe prawice..., The Hands Were Swollen by Clapping..., 1858).

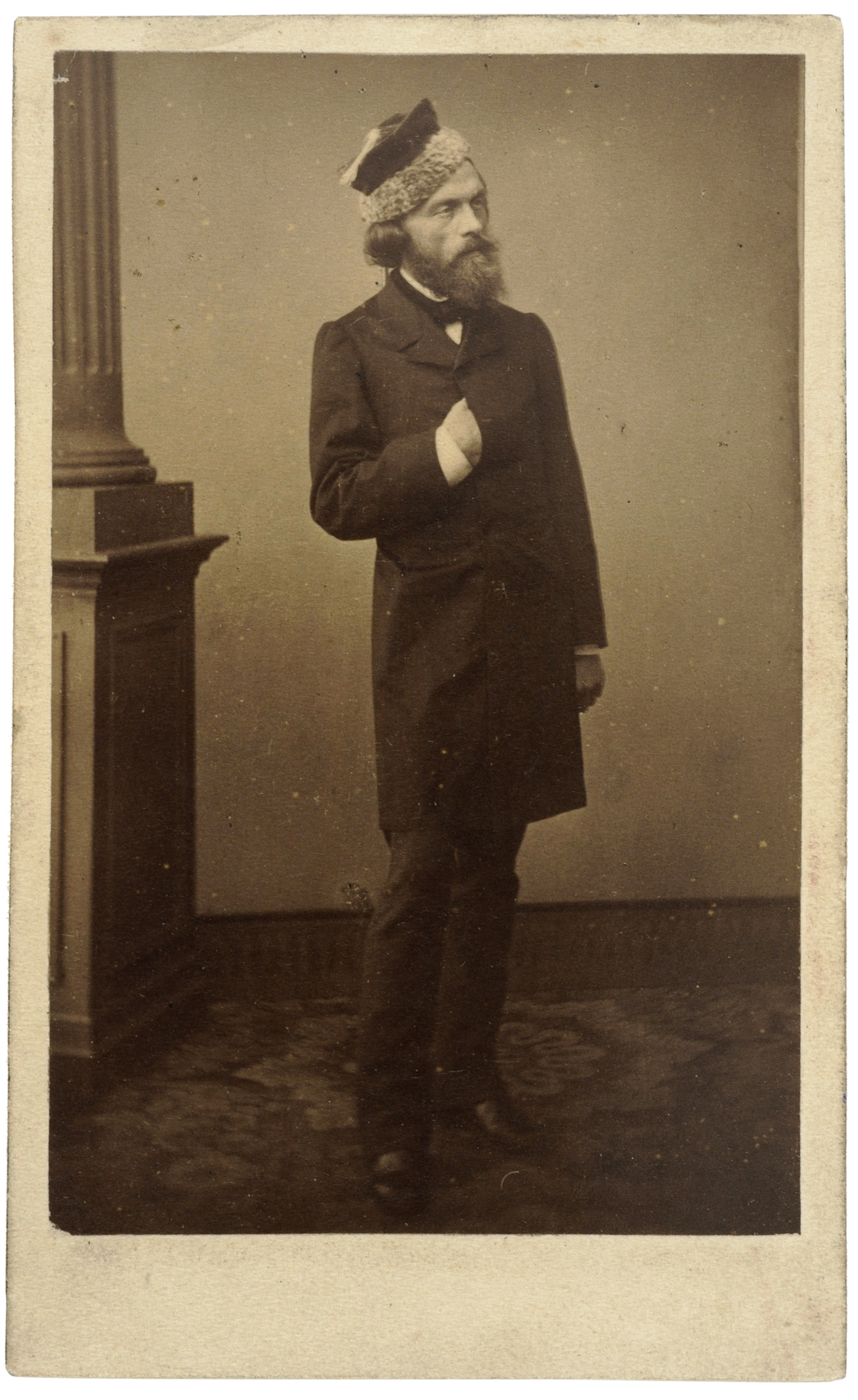
Norwid, Paris, 1861

In 1866, the poet finished his work on Vade-mecum, a vast anthology of verse. However, despite his greatest efforts it could not be published until decades later. One of the reasons for this included Prince Władysław Czartoryski failing to grant the poet the loan he had promised. In subsequent years, Norwid lived in extreme poverty and suffered from tuberculosis. During the Franco-Prussian War of 1870, many of his friends and patrons were distracted with the global events: Norwid experienced starvation, and his health further deteriorated. Material hardships did not stop him from writing: in 1869 he wrote Rzecz o wolności słowa (A Poem About the Freedom of the Word), a long treatise in verse about the history of words, which was well received at that time. The next year he wrote Assunta, a poem reflecting his views on Christian love, which Hungarian poet George Gömöri called Norwid's "most successful narrative poem". Those years also saw him write three more plays, comedies Aktor. Komediodrama (Actor. Comedy-drama, 1867), Za kulisami (Behind the Scenes, 1865–1866), and Pierścień Wielkiej Damy (The Ring of a Grand Lady, 1872), which Gömöri praised as Norwid's "real genre within the theater". The latter play became Norwid's most frequently performed theater piece, although like many of his works, it gained recognition long after his death (published in print in 1933, and staged in 1936). (Note: Miłosz noted that Norwid's plays are permormed in Poland occasionally but "they are difficult to stage on account of their reliance upon innuendos and their deliberate avoidance of blatant effects. They could more aptly be called dramatic poems".)

In 1877 his cousin, Michał Kleczkowski relocated Norwid to the St. Casimir's Institute nursing home (Œuvre de Saint Casimir) on the outskirts of Paris in Ivry. That location, run by Polish nuns, was home to many destitute Polish emigrants. There, Norwid was befriended by Teodor Jełowicki who also gave him material support. Some of his final works include a comedy play Miłość czysta u kąpieli morskich (Pure Love at Sea Baths, 1880), the philosophical treatesie Milczenie (Silence, 1882), and novels Ad leones! (written c. 1881–1883), Stygmat (Stigmata, 1881–82) and Tajemnica lorda Singelworth (The Secret of Lord Singelworth, 1883). Throughout his life, he also wrote many letters, over a thousand of which survived to be studied by scholars.

During the last months of his life, Norwid was weak and bed-ridden. He frequently wept and refused to speak with anyone. He died in the morning of 23 May 1883. Jełowicki and Kleczkjowski personally covered the burial costs, and Norwid's funeral was also attended by Franciszek Duchiński and Mieczysław Geniusz. After 15 years the funds to maintain his grave dried out and his body was moved to a mass grave of Polish emigrants.

== Themes and views ==
Norwid's early style could be classified as belonging within the romanticism tradition, but it soon evolved beyond it. Some scholars consider Norwid to represent late romanticism, while others see him as an early modernist. Polish literary critics, Przemysław Czapliński, Tamara Trojanowska and Joanna Niżyńska described Norwid as "a 'late child' and simultaneously a great critic of Romanticism" and "the first post-Romantic poet [of Poland]". Danuta Borchardt who translated some of Norwid's poems to English wrote that "Norwid's work belongs to late Romanticism. However, he was so original that scholars cannot pigeonhole his work into any specific literary period". Czesław Miłosz, a Polish poet and Nobel laureate, wrote that "[Norwid] preserved complete independence from the literary currents of the day". This could be seen in his short stories, which went against the common trend in the 19th century to write realistic prose and instead are more aptly described as "modern parables".

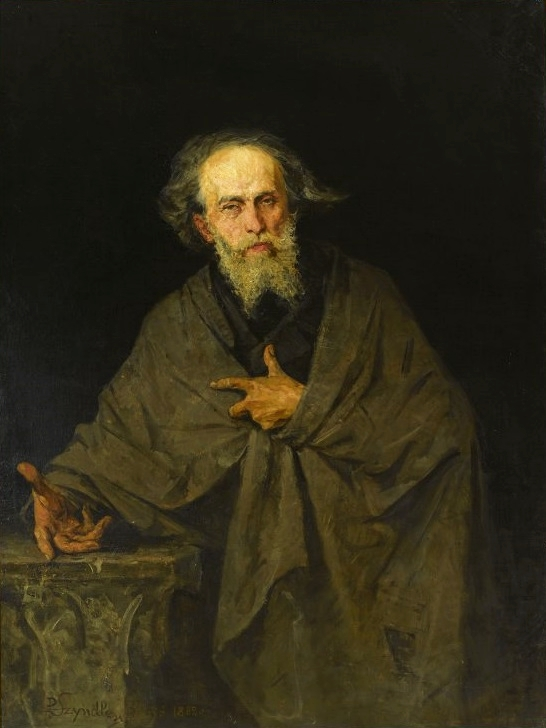
Norwid in 1882, by Pantaleon Szyndler

Critics and literary historians eventually concluded that during his life, Norwid was rejected by his contemporaries as his works were too unique. His style increasingly departing from then-prevailing forms and themes found in romanticism and positivism, and the subjects of his works were also often not aligned with the political views of the emigre Poles. His style was criticized for "being obscure and overly cerebral" and having a "jarring syntax". Even today, a number of scholars refer to his works, in this context, as "dark", meaning "weird" or "difficult to understand".

While Norwid did not create neologisms, he would change words creating new variations of existing language, and he also experimented with syntax and punctuation, for example through the use of hyphenated words, which are uncommon in the Polish language. Much of his work is rhymed, although some is seen as a precursor to free verse that later became more common in Polish poetry. Miłosz noted that Norwid was "against aestheticism", and that he aimed to "break the monotony... of the syllabic pattern", purposefully making his verses "roughhewn".

While Norwid displays a Romantic admiration for heroes, he almost never addresses the concept of romantic love. Norwid attempted to start new types of literary works, for example "high comedy" and "bloodless white tragedy". His works are considered to be deeply philosophical and utilitarian, and he rejected "art for art's sake". He is seen as a harsh critic of the Polish society as well as of mass culture. His portrayal of women characters has been praised as more developed than that of many of his contemporaries, whose female characters were more one-dimensional. Borchardt summarized his ideas as "that of a man deeply distressed by and disappointed in mankind, yet hopeful of its eventual redemption". Miłosz pointed out that Norwid used irony (comparing his use of it to Jules Laforgue or T. S. Eliot), but it was "so hidden within symbols and parables" that it was often missed by most readers. He also argued that Norwid is "undoubtedly... the most 'intellectual' poet to ever write in Polish", although lack of audience has "permitted him to indulge in such a torturing of the language that some of his lines are hopelessely obscure".

Norwid's works featured more than purely Polish context, employing pan-European, Greco-Christian symbology. They also endorsed orthodox Christian, Roman Catholic views; in fact Gömöri argues that one of his major themes was "the state and future of Christian civilization". Miłosz similarly noted that Norwid did not reject civilization, although he was critical of some of its aspects; he saw history as a story of progress "to make martyrdom unnecessary on Earth". Historical references are common in Norwid's work, which Miłosz describes as affected by "intense historicism". Norwid's stay in America also made him a supporter of the abolitionist movement, and in 1859 he wrote two poems about John Brown Do obywatela Johna Brown (To Citizen John Brown) and John Brown. Another recurring motif in his work was the importance of labor, particularly in the context of artistic work, with his discussions of issues such as how artists should be compensated in the capitalistic society - although Miłosz noted that Norwid was not a socialist.

Norwid's work has also been treated as deeply philosophical. Miłosz also noted that some consider Norwid to be a philosopher more than an artist, and indeed Norwid has inspired, among others, philosophers such as Stanisław Brzozowski. Nonetheless, Miłosz disagrees with that notion, quoting Mieczysław Jastrun who wrote that Norwid was "first of all, an artist, but an artist for whom the most interesting material is thought, reflection, the cultural experience of mankind".

== Legacy and commemoration ==
Following his death, many of Norwid's works were forgotten; it was not until the early 20th century, in the Young Poland period, that his finesse and style was appreciated. At that time, his work was discovered and popularised by Zenon Przesmycki, a Polish poet and literary critic who was a member of the Polish Academy of Literature. Przesmycki started republishing Norwid's works c. 1897, and created an enduring image of him, one of "the dramatic legend of the cursed poet".

Norwid's "Collected Works" (Dzieła Zebrane) were published in 1966 by Juliusz Wiktor Gomulicki, a Norwid biographer and commentator. The full iconic collection of Norwid's work was released during the period 1971–1976 as Pisma Wszystkie ("Collected Works"). Comprising 11 volumes, it includes all of Norwid's poetry as well as his letters and reproductions of his artwork.

On 24 September 2001, 118 years after his death, an urn with soil from the collective grave where Norwid had been interred in Paris' Montmorency cemetery was buried in the "Crypts of the Bards" at Wawel Cathedral. There, Norwid's remains were placed next to those of fellow Polish poets Adam Mickiewicz and Juliusz Słowacki. During a mass held at the cathedral, the Archbishop of Kraków, cardinal Franciszek Macharski said that the doors of the crypt have opened "to receive the great poet, Cyprian Kamil Norwid, into Wawel's royal cathedral, for he was an equal of kings".

In 2021, on the 200th anniversary of Norwid's birth, the brothers Stephen and Timothy Quay produced a short film titled Vade-mecum about the poet's life and work in an attempt to promote his legacy among foreign audiences.

Norwid is often considered the fourth more important poet of the Polish romanticism, and called the Fourth of the Three Bards. In fact, some literary critics of the late 20th-century Poland were skeptical as to the value of Krasiński's work and considered Norwid to be the Third bard instead of Fourth. Well known in Poland, and a part of Polish school's curricula, Norwid nonetheless remains obscure in English-speaking world. He has been praised as the best poet of the 19th century by Joseph Brodsky and Tomas Venclova. Miłosz notes he has become recognized as a "precusor of modern Polish poetry".

The life and work of Norwid have been subject to a number of scholarly treatments. Those include the English-language collection of essays about him, published after a 1983 conference held to commemorate century since his death (Cyprian Norwid (1821–1883): Poet - Thinker - Craftsman, 1988) or monographs such as Jacek Lyszczyna's (2016) Cyprian Norwid. Poeta wieku dziewiętnastego (Cyprian Norwid. A Poet of the Nineteenth Century). An academic journal dedicated to the study of Norwid, Studia Norwidiana, has been published since 1983.

== Works ==
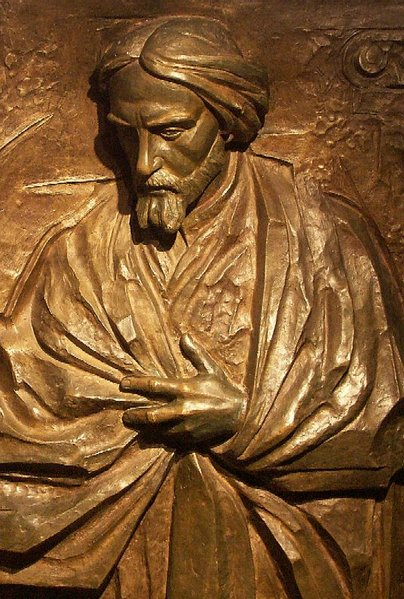
Bas relief of Norwid, Wawel Cathedral

Norwid authored numerous works, from poems, both epic and short, to plays, short stories, essays and letters. During his lifetime, according to Miłosz and Gömöri, he published only one large volume of poetry (in 1862) (Note: According to his birth certificate, he was named Cyprian Ksawery Gerard Walenty Norwid. However, he is usually referred to with the middle name Kamil he chose for himself during his Catholic confirmation ceremony (on 27 March 1845 in Santi Claudio Church in Rome.).) (although Borchardt mentions another volume from 1866). Borchardt considers his major works to be Vade-mecum, Promethidion and Ad leones!. Miłosz acknowledged Vade-mecum as Norwid's most influential work, but also praised the earlier Bema pamięci rapsod żałobny as one of his most famous poems.

Norwid's most extensive work,Vade-mecum, written between 1858 and 1865, was first published a century after his death. Some of Norwid's works have been translated into English by Walter Whipple and Danuta Borchardt in the United States of America, and by Jerzy Pietrkiewicz and Adam Czerniawski in Britain. A number have also received translations to other languages, such as Bengali, French, German, Italian, Russian, Slovak and Ukrainian.

From May 2024, an autograph copy of Vade-mecum is presented at a permanent exhibition in the Palace of the Commonwealth. There are also presented two albums Orbis I and Orbis II, containing Norwid's original works and copies of works in various media, in addition to hand written notes, magazine cuttings and photographs.

== See also ==
- Cyprian Norwid Theatre
- List of Polish poets
- Parnassism
- Stanisław Wyspiański, another Polish writer also called the Fourth Bard of Poland
