= Bohdan Melnychuk =

Bohdan Melnychuk may refer to:

- Bohdan Melnychuk (writer and translator) (1937–2025), Ukrainian philologist, poet, publicist, journalist, teacher and translator
- Bohdan Melnychuk (writer and local historian) (born 1952), Ukrainian writer, playwright, editor, journalist and local historian
