= Hrynky, Ternopil Oblast =

Village in Ternopil Oblast, Ukraine

Hrynky Гриньки
- Village
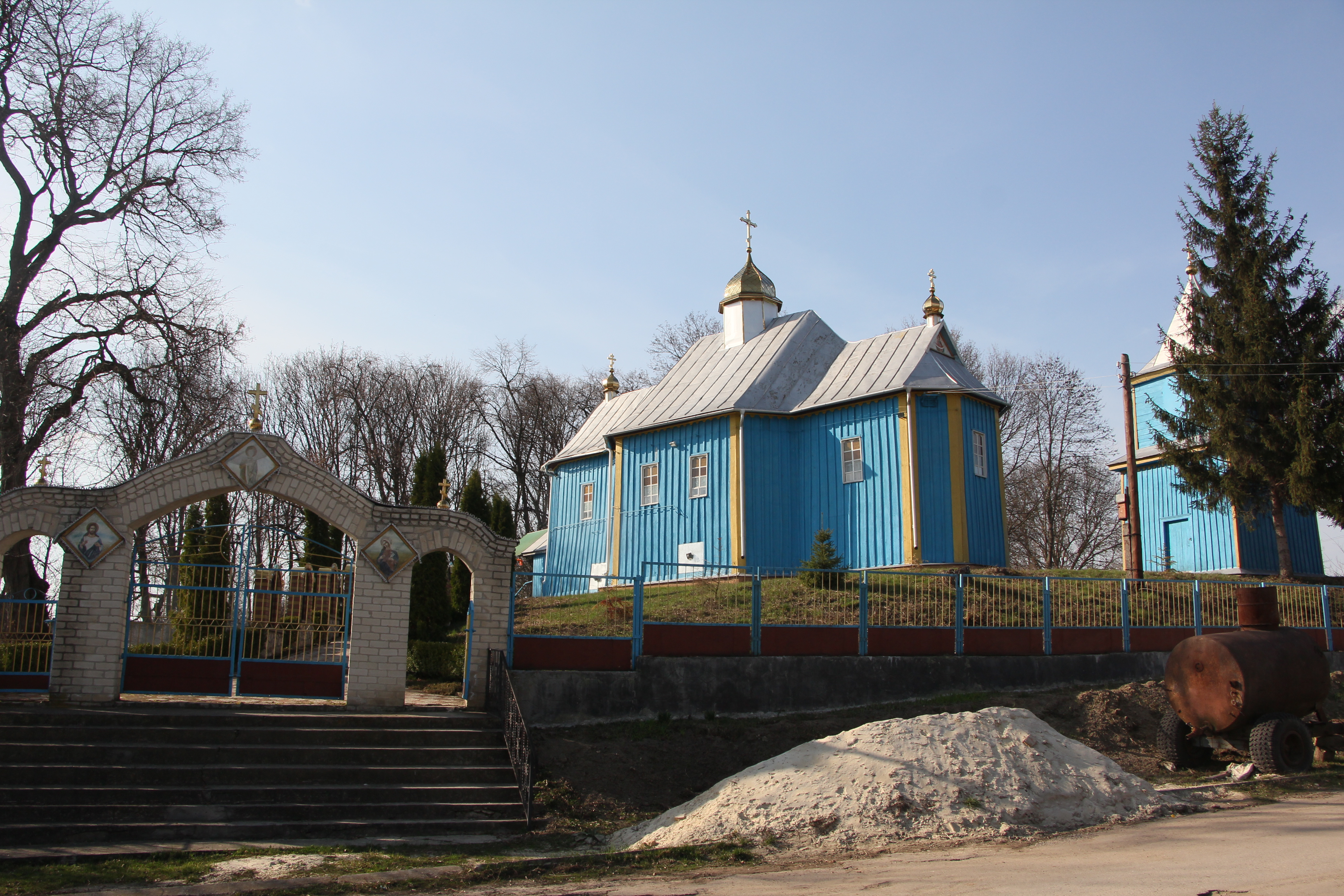
- Wooden church in Hrynky

- Location within Ternopil Oblast Location within Ukraine
- Coordinates: 49°51′28″N 26°07′58″E
- Country: Ukraine
- Oblast: Ternopil Oblast
- Raion: Kremenets Raion

Population (2001)
  - Total: 264
- Time zone: UTC+2 (EET)
  - Summer (DST): UTC+3 (EEST)

Hrynky (Ukrainian: Гриньки) is a village in Kremenets Raion of Ternopil Oblast in Ukraine.

Since 12 June 2020, it has been located in the Lanivtsi urban hromada, one of the hromadas of Ukraine.

== History ==
Hrynky was first mentioned in 1583 as the property of Prince Stefan Zbarazh. On 1 January 1924, the Lanivtsi parish, which had been liquidated at the time, was restored as the Lanivtsi commune of Kremenets Raion, and the village of Hrynky, withdrawn from the Bilozirka commune, was annexed to it.

During the winter of 1937-1938 Hrynky was an epicentre of the campaign of revindication initiated by the Polish authorities. As a result of pressure from the police and Border Protection Corps, 116 Orthodox Ukrainians in the village were forced to adopt Roman Catholicism. Inhabitants of nearby Lanivtsi, Bilozirka and Yuskivtsi were also targeted by the campaign. The event solidified Ukrainian identity in Volhynia and was protested by Ukrainian deputies in the Sejm.

== Demographics ==
Native language as of the Ukrainian Census of 2001:

- Ukrainian 99.62%
- Others 0.38%
