= Wolica =

Wolica may refer to:

- Wolica, Kuyavian-Pomeranian Voivodeship (north-central Poland)
- Wolica, Hrubieszów County in Lublin Voivodeship (east Poland)
- Wolica, Krasnystaw County in Lublin Voivodeship (east Poland)
- Wolica, Lubartów County in Lublin Voivodeship (east Poland)
- Wolica, Gmina Karczmiska in Opole County, Lublin Voivodeship (east Poland)
- Wolica, Bełchatów County in Łódź Voivodeship (central Poland)
- Wolica, Piotrków County in Łódź Voivodeship (central Poland)
- Wolica, Gmina Żelechlinek, Tomaszów County in Łódź Voivodeship (central Poland)
- Wolica, Bochnia County in Lesser Poland Voivodeship (south Poland)
- Wolica, Pruszków County in Masovian Voivodeship (east-central Poland)
- Wolica, Warsaw, a neighbourhood in Warsaw, Masovian Voivodeship
- Wolica, Jasło County in Subcarpathian Voivodeship (south-east Poland)
- Wolica, Sanok County in Subcarpathian Voivodeship (south-east Poland)
- Wolica, Greater Poland Voivodeship (west-central Poland)
- Wolica, Miechów County in Lesser Poland Voivodeship (south Poland)
- Wolica, Gmina Busko-Zdrój in Świętokrzyskie Voivodeship (south-central Poland)
- Wolica, Gmina Stopnica in Świętokrzyskie Voivodeship (south-central Poland)
- Wolica, Jędrzejów County in Świętokrzyskie Voivodeship (south-central Poland)
- Wolica, Kielce County in Świętokrzyskie Voivodeship (south-central Poland)
- Wolica, Przeworsk County in Subcarpathian Voivodeship (south-east Poland)
- Wolica, Pińczów County in Świętokrzyskie Voivodeship (south-central Poland)
- Wolica, Gmina Bogoria in Świętokrzyskie Voivodeship (south-central Poland)
- Wolica, Gmina Łubnice in Świętokrzyskie Voivodeship (south-central Poland)
- Wolica, Gmina Szydłów in Świętokrzyskie Voivodeship (south-central Poland)
- Wolica, Gmina Secemin in Świętokrzyskie Voivodeship (south-central Poland)
- Wolica, Warsaw West County in Masovian Voivodeship (east-central Poland)
- Wolica, Kraków, district of Kraków
- Wolica, Warsaw, a low-rise residential neighbourhood in Warsaw, Poland
- Wolica (housing estate), a high-rise housing estate in Warsaw, Poland
- Wolica, the former Polish name for the village of Volytsia, in Lanivtsi urban hromada, Kremenets Raion, Ternopil Oblast, Ukraine
