= Melnychuk =

Melnychuk is Ukrainian surname and a patronymic derivative of Melnyk. Alternative spellings: via Russian: Melnichuk, via Polish: Melniczuk/Melnyczuk. Notable people with the surname include:

- Alexei Melnichuk, Russian ice hockey player
- Askold Melnyczuk, American writer
- Bohdan Melnychuk, multiple persons:
  - Bohdan Melnychuk (writer and translator) (1937 – 2025)
  - Bohdan Melnychuk (writer and local historian) (born 1952))
- Dmytro Melnychuk (born 1943), Ukrainian scientist
- Maksym Melnychuk (born 1999), Ukrainian football player
- Valentyn Melnychuk (basketball) (born 1940), Ukrainian basketball coach
- Vasyl Melnychuk (born 1957), Ukrainian football referee
