= Buhliv =

Rural locality in Ternopil Oblast, Ukraine

Buhliv Буглів
- Interactive map of Buhliv
- Location in Ternopil Oblast Buhliv (Ternopil Oblast)
- Coordinates: 49°45′45″N 26°3′20″E
- Country: Ukraine
- Oblast: Ternopil Oblast
- Raion: Kremenets Raion
- Hromada: Lanivtsi urban hromada
- Time zone: UTC+2 (EET)
  - Summer (DST): UTC+3 (EEST)
- Postal code: 47443

Buhliv (Ukrainian: Буглів) is a village in Ukraine, Ternopil Oblast, Kremenets Raion, Lanivtsi urban hromada. After the liquidation of the Lanivtsi Raion on 19 July 2020, the village became part of the Kremenets Raion.

== Bibliography ==
- "Buhłów, pow. krzemieniecki". Geographical Dictionary of the Kingdom of Poland (in Polish). p. 267.
