= Velyka Bilka =

Rural locality in Ternopil Oblast, Ukraine

Velyka Bilka Велика Білка
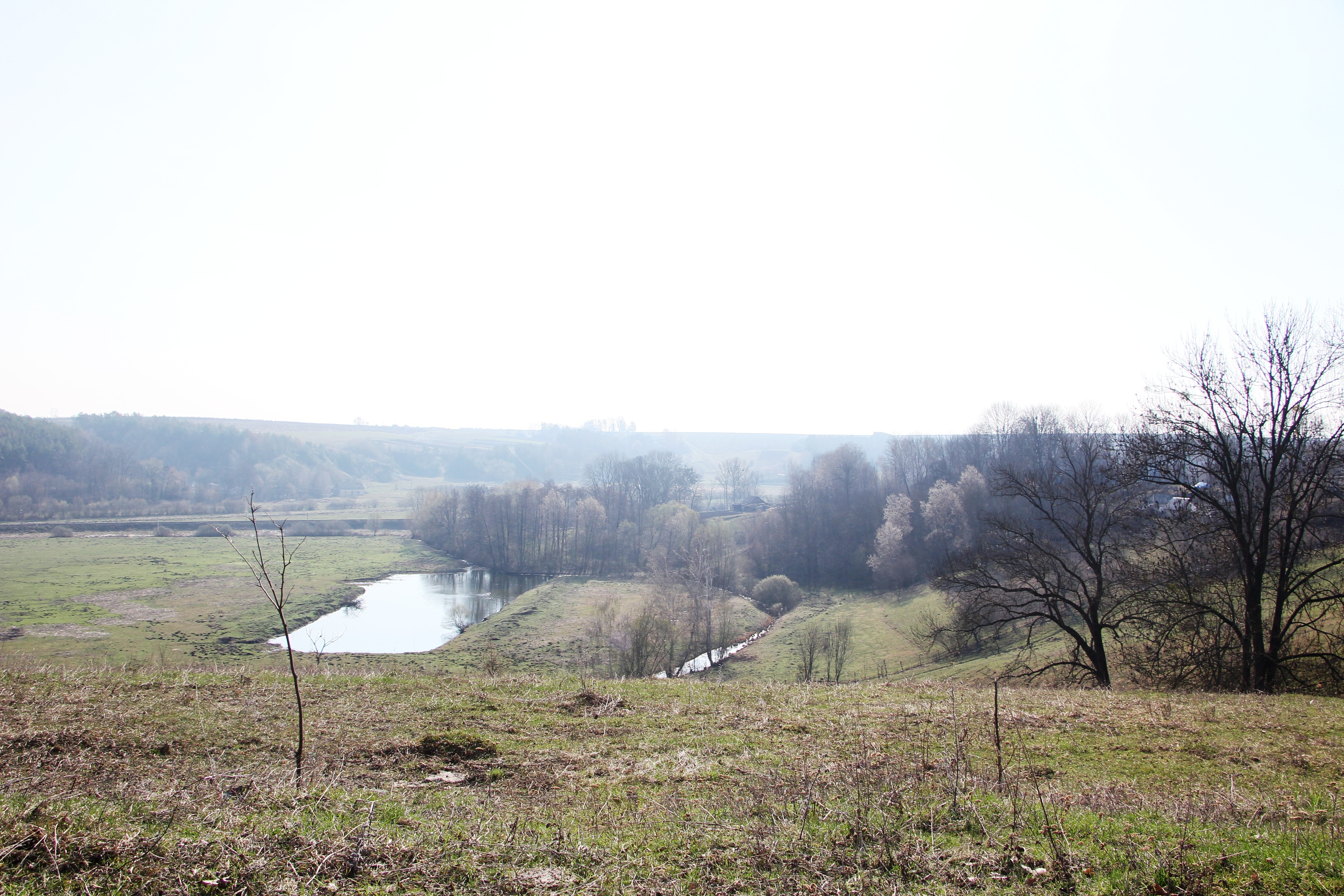
- The pond and part of the village of Velyka Bilka
- Interactive map of Velyka Bilka
- Location in Ternopil Oblast Velyka Bilka (Ternopil Oblast)
- Coordinates: 49°48′10″N 25°58′15″E
- Country: Ukraine
- Oblast: Ternopil Oblast
- Raion: Kremenets Raion
- Hromada: Lanivtsi urban hromada
- Time zone: UTC+2 (EET)
  - Summer (DST): UTC+3 (EEST)
- Postal code: 47440

Velyka Bilka (Ukrainian: Велика Білка) is a village in Ukraine, Ternopil Oblast, Kremenets Raion, Lanivtsi urban hromada. After the liquidation of the Lanivtsi Raion on 19 July 2020, the village became part of the Kremenets Raion.

== Bibliography ==
- "Biłka al. Białka 1.), wś, powiat krzemieniecki". Geographical Dictionary of the Kingdom of Poland (in Polish). p. 154.
