= Martyshkivtsi =

Rural locality in Ternopil Oblast, Ukraine

Martyshkivtsi Мартишківці
- Interactive map of Martyshkivtsi
- Location in Ternopil Oblast Martyshkivtsi (Ternopil Oblast)
- Coordinates: 49°49′23″N 25°56′59″E
- Country: Ukraine
- Oblast: Ternopil Oblast
- Raion: Kremenets Raion
- Hromada: Lanivtsi urban hromada
- Time zone: UTC+2 (EET)
  - Summer (DST): UTC+3 (EEST)
- Postal code: 47440

Martyshkivtsi (Ukrainian: Мартишківці) is a village in Ukraine, Ternopil Oblast, Kremenets Raion, Lanivtsi urban hromada. After the liquidation of the Lanivtsi Raion on 19 July 2020, the village became part of the Kremenets Raion.

== Bibliography ==
- (in Ukrainian) Ханас М., Мартишківці // Ternopil Encyclopedic Dictionary: in 4 v. / editorial board: H. Yavorskyi and other, Ternopil: "Zbruch", 2005, V. 2: К—О, S. 464. — ISBN 966-528-199-2.
- "Martyszkowce". Geographical Dictionary of the Kingdom of Poland (in Polish). 6. Warszawa: Kasa im. Józefa Mianowskiego. 1885. p. 141.
- "Martyszkowce, pow. krzemieniecki". Geographical Dictionary of the Kingdom of Poland (in Polish). p. 305.
