= Korzhkivtsi =

Rural locality in Ternopil Oblast, Ukraine

Korzhkivtsi Коржківці
- Interactive map of Korzhkivtsi
- Location in Ternopil Oblast Korzhkivtsi (Ternopil Oblast)
- Coordinates: 49°44′42″N 25°54′47″E
- Country: Ukraine
- Oblast: Ternopil Oblast
- Raion: Kremenets Raion
- Hromada: Lanivtsi urban hromada

Population (2001)
  - Total: 166
- Time zone: UTC+2 (EET)
  - Summer (DST): UTC+3 (EEST)
- Postal code: 47433

Korzhkivtsi (Ukrainian: Коржківці) is a village in Ukraine, Ternopil Oblast, Kremenets Raion, Lanivtsi urban hromada. After the liquidation of the Lanivtsi Raion on 19 July 2020, the village became part of the Kremenets Raion.
