= Molotkiv =

Rural locality in Ternopil Oblast, Ukraine

Molotkiv Молотків
- Location in Ternopil Oblast
- Coordinates: 49°49′29″N 26°11′17″E
- Country: Ukraine
- Oblast: Ternopil Oblast
- Raion: Kremenets Raion
- Hromada: Lanivtsi urban hromada
- Time zone: UTC+2 (EET)
  - Summer (DST): UTC+3 (EEST)
- Postal code: 47451

Molotkiv (Ukrainian: Молотків) is a village in the Lanivtsi urban hromada of the Kremenets Raion of Ternopil Oblast in Ukraine.

== History ==
The first written mention of the village was in 1584.

After the liquidation of the Lanivtsi Raion on 19 July 2020, the village became part of the Kremenets Raion.

== Religion ==
- Saint George the Victorious church (1784, wooden).

== Notable residents ==
- Bohdan Melnychuk (born 1952), Ukrainian writer, playwright, editor, journalist, local historian.

== Sources ==
- (in Ukrainian) Гаврильцьо І., Уніят В., Молотків // Ternopil Encyclopedic Dictionary: in 4 v. / editorial board: H. Yavorskyi and other, Ternopil: "Zbruch", 2005, V. 2: К—О, S. 551. — ISBN 966-528-199-2.
- "Mołotków (1)". Geographical Dictionary of the Kingdom of Poland (in Polish). p. 350.
