= Vanzhuliv =

Rural locality in Ternopil Oblast, Ukraine

Vanzhukiv Ванжулів
- Interactive map of Vanzhukiv
- Location in Ternopil Oblast Vanzhukiv (Ternopil Oblast)
- Coordinates: 49°47′26″N 26°4′52″E
- Country: Ukraine
- Oblast: Ternopil Oblast
- Raion: Kremenets Raion
- Hromada: Lanivtsi urban hromada
- Time zone: UTC+2 (EET)
  - Summer (DST): UTC+3 (EEST)
- Postal code: 47442

Vanzhukiv (Ukrainian: Ванжулів) is a village in Ukraine, Ternopil Oblast, Kremenets Raion, Lanivtsi urban hromada. After the liquidation of the Lanivtsi Raion on 19 July 2020, the village became part of the Kremenets Raion.

== Bibliography ==
- (in Ukrainian) Басюк Г., Бригадир В., Уніят В., Ванжулів // Ternopil Encyclopedic Dictionary: in 4 v. / editorial board: H. Yavorskyi and other, Ternopil: "Zbruch", 2004, V. 1: А—Й, S. 221. — ISBN 966-528-197-6.
- "Wanżułów". Geographical Dictionary of the Kingdom of Poland (in Polish). p. 677.
