= Osnyky, Ternopil Oblast =

Rural locality in Ternopil Oblast, Ukraine

Osnyky Осники
- Interactive map of Osnyky
- Location in Ternopil Oblast Osnyky (Ternopil Oblast)
- Coordinates: 49°50′23″N 26°10′43″E
- Country: Ukraine
- Oblast: Ternopil Oblast
- Raion: Kremenets Raion
- Hromada: Lanivtsi urban hromada

Population (2003)
  - Total: 204
- Time zone: UTC+2 (EET)
  - Summer (DST): UTC+3 (EEST)
- Postal code: 47451

Osnyky (Ukrainian: Осники) is a village in Ukraine, Ternopil Oblast, Kremenets Raion, Lanivtsi urban hromada. After the liquidation of the Lanivtsi Raion on 19 July 2020, the village became part of the Kremenets Raion.

== Bibliography ==
- (in Ukrainian) О. Борух, Б. Мельничук., Осники // Ternopil Encyclopedic Dictionary: in 4 v. / editorial board: H. Yavorskyi and other, Ternopil: "Zbruch", 2005, V. 2: К—О, S. 691. — ISBN 966-528-199-2.
- "Ośniki 1.) wś, pow. krzemieniecki". Geographical Dictionary of the Kingdom of Poland (in Polish). p. 419.
