= Ivankivtsi, Lanivtsi urban hromada, Kremenets Raion, Ternopil Oblast =

Rural locality in Ternopil Oblast, Ukraine

Ivankivtsi Іванківці
- Interactive map of Ivankivtsi
- Location in Ternopil Oblast Ivankivtsi (Ternopil Oblast)
- Coordinates: 49°48′31″N 26°7′47″E
- Country: Ukraine
- Oblast: Ternopil Oblast
- Raion: Kremenets Raion
- Hromada: Lanivtsi urban hromada
- Time zone: UTC+2 (EET)
  - Summer (DST): UTC+3 (EEST)
- Postal code: 47452

Ivankivtsi (Ukrainian: Іванківці) is a village in Ukraine, Ternopil Oblast, Kremenets Raion, Lanivtsi urban hromada. After the liquidation of the Lanivtsi Raion on 19 July 2020, the village became part of the Kremenets Raion.

== Bibliography ==
- "Jankowce (4), pow. krzemieniecki". Geographical Dictionary of the Kingdom of Poland (in Polish). p. 634.
