= Hrybova =

Rural locality in Ternopil Oblast, Ukraine

Hrybova Грибова
- Interactive map of Hrybova
- Location in Ternopil Oblast Hrybova (Ternopil Oblast)
- Coordinates: 49°53′12″N 26°7′3″E
- Country: Ukraine
- Oblast: Ternopil Oblast
- Raion: Kremenets Raion
- Hromada: Lanivtsi urban hromada
- Time zone: UTC+2 (EET)
  - Summer (DST): UTC+3 (EEST)
- Postal code: 47461

Hrybova (Ukrainian: Грибова) is a village in Ukraine, Ternopil Oblast, Kremenets Raion, Lanivtsi urban hromada. After the abolition of the Lanivtsi Raion on 19 July 2020, the village became part of the Kremenets Raion.

== Bibliography ==
- "Hrybowa". Geographical Dictionary of the Kingdom of Poland (in Polish). p. 593.
