= Zahirtsi, Ternopil Oblast =

Rural locality in Ternopil Oblast, Ukraine

Zahirtsi Загірці
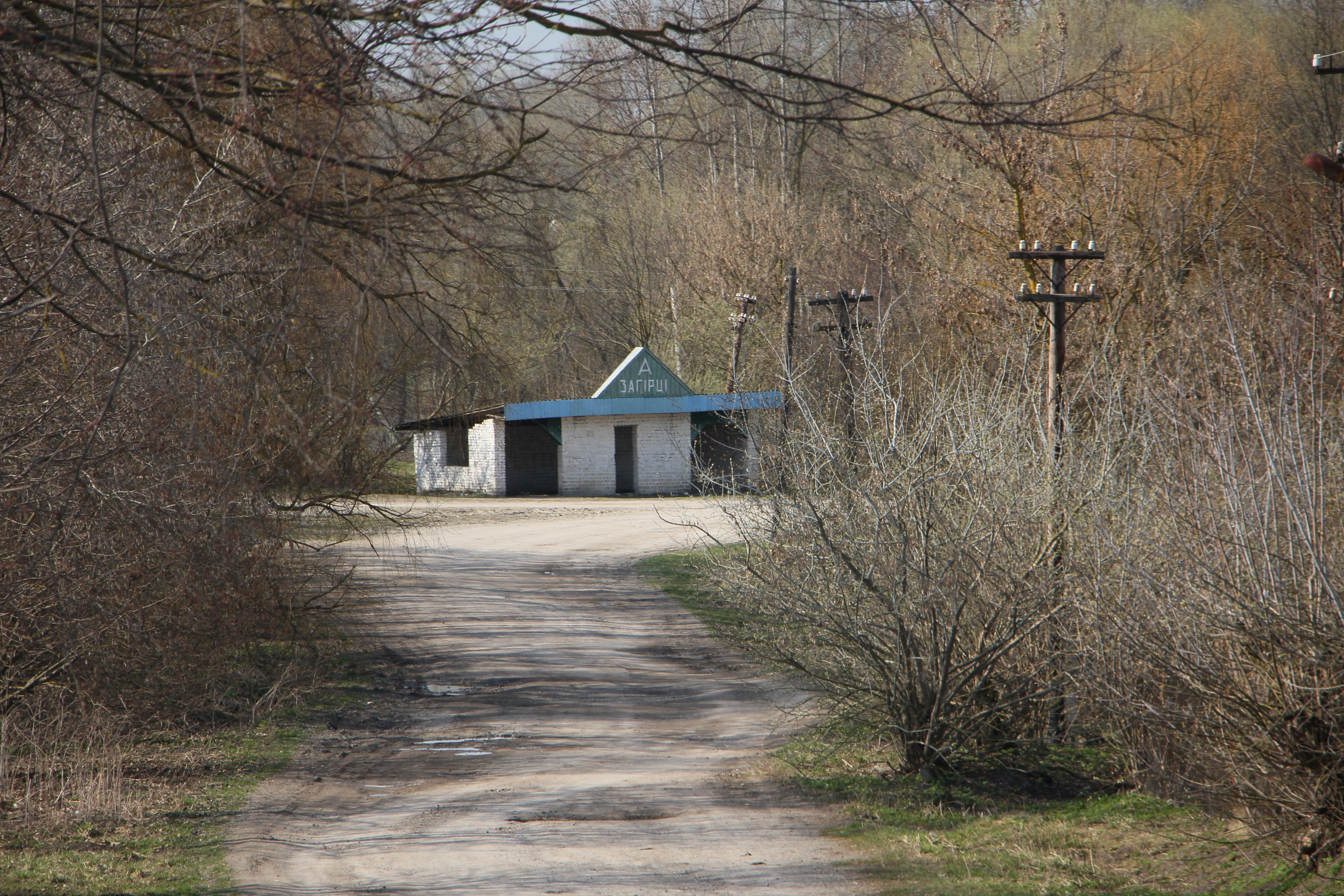
- Bus stop in the village of Zahirtsi, Lanovets district, Ternopil region
- Interactive map of Zahirtsi
- Location in Ternopil Oblast Zahirtsi (Ternopil Oblast)
- Coordinates: 49°56′14″N 26°7′27″E
- Country: Ukraine
- Oblast: Ternopil Oblast
- Raion: Kremenets Raion
- Hromada: Lanivtsi urban hromada
- Time zone: UTC+2 (EET)
  - Summer (DST): UTC+3 (EEST)
- Postal code: 47421

Zahirtsi (Ukrainian: Загірці) is a village in Ukraine, Ternopil Oblast, Kremenets Raion, Lanivtsi urban hromada. After the liquidation of the Lanivtsi Raion on 19 July 2020, the village became part of the Kremenets Raion.

== Bibliography ==
- "Zahorce 2.), powiat krzemieniecki, gmina Jampol (10 w.)". Geographical Dictionary of the Kingdom of Poland (in Polish). 14. Warszawa: Kasa im. Józefa Mianowskiego. 1895. p. 282.
- "Zahorce, 2.) wś, powiat krzemieniecki". Geographical Dictionary of the Kingdom of Poland (in Polish). p. 709.
