= Mali Kuskivtsi =

Rural locality in Ternopil Oblast, Ukraine

Mali Kuskivtsi Малі Кусківці
- Interactive map of Mali Kuskivtsi
- Location in Ternopil Oblast Mali Kuskivtsi (Ternopil Oblast)
- Coordinates: 49°50′51″N 26°2′29″E
- Country: Ukraine
- Oblast: Ternopil Oblast
- Raion: Kremenets Raion
- Hromada: Lanivtsi urban hromada
- Time zone: UTC+2 (EET)
  - Summer (DST): UTC+3 (EEST)
- Postal code: 47402

Mali Kuskivtsi (Ukrainian: Малі Кусківці) is a village in Ukraine, Ternopil Oblast, Kremenets Raion, Lanivtsi urban hromada. After the liquidation of the Lanivtsi Raion on 19 July 2020, the village became part of the Kremenets Raion.

== Bibliography ==
- (in Ukrainian) Мельничук Б., Петраш Б., Малі Кусківці // Ternopil Oblast. History of cities and villages: in 3 v. / Ternopil: "Terno-graph", 2014, V. 2: Г—Л, S. 659. — ISBN 978-966-457-228-3.
- (in Ukrainian) Ханас М., Малі Кусківці // Ternopil Encyclopedic Dictionary: in 4 v. / editorial board: H. Yavorskyi and other, Ternopil: "Zbruch", 2005, V. 2: К—О, S. 447. — ISBN 966-528-199-2.
