= Vereshchaky, Ternopil Oblast =

Rural locality in Ternopil Oblast, Ukraine

Vereshchaky Верещаки
- Interactive map of Vereshchaky
- Location in Ternopil Oblast Vereshchaky (Ternopil Oblast)
- Coordinates: 49°43′54″N 25°57′15″E
- Country: Ukraine
- Oblast: Ternopil Oblast
- Raion: Kremenets Raion
- Hromada: Lanivtsi urban hromada
- Time zone: UTC+2 (EET)
  - Summer (DST): UTC+3 (EEST)
- Postal code: 47434

Vereshchaky (Ukrainian: Верещаки) is a village in Ukraine, Ternopil Oblast, Kremenets Raion, Lanivtsi urban hromada. After the liquidation of the Lanivtsi Raion on 19 July 2020, the village became part of the Kremenets Raion.

== Bibliography ==
- "Wereszczaki 1.), pow. krzemieniecki". Geographical Dictionary of the Kingdom of Poland (in Polish). 13. Warszawa: Kasa im. Józefa Mianowskiego. 1893. p. 226.
