= Kutyska =

Rural locality in Ternopil Oblast, Ukraine

Kutyska Кутиска
- Interactive map of Kutyska
- Location in Ternopil Oblast Kutyska (Ternopil Oblast)
- Coordinates: 49°44′5″N 26°2′23″E
- Country: Ukraine
- Oblast: Ternopil Oblast
- Raion: Kremenets Raion
- Hromada: Lanivtsi urban hromada
- Time zone: UTC+2 (EET)
  - Summer (DST): UTC+3 (EEST)
- Postal code: 47444

Kutyska (Ukrainian: Кутиска) is a village in Ukraine, Ternopil Oblast, Kremenets Raion, Lanivtsi urban hromada. After the liquidation of the Lanivtsi Raion on 19 July 2020, the village became part of the Kremenets Raion.

== Bibliography ==
- (in Ukrainian) Б. Мельничук., Кутиска // Ternopil Encyclopedic Dictionary: in 4 v. / editorial board: H. Yavorskyi and other, Ternopil: "Zbruch", 2005, V. 2: К—О, S. 297. — ISBN 966-528-199-2.
- "Kutyski". Geographical Dictionary of the Kingdom of Poland (in Polish). p. 204.
