= Krasnoluka =

Rural locality in Ternopil Oblast, Ukraine

Krasnoluka Краснолука
- Interactive map of Krasnoluka
- Location in Ternopil Oblast Krasnoluka (Ternopil Oblast)
- Coordinates: 49°54′8″N 26°3′19″E
- Country: Ukraine
- Oblast: Ternopil Oblast
- Raion: Kremenets Raion
- Hromada: Lanivtsi urban hromada

Population (2001)
  - Total: 579
- Time zone: UTC+2 (EET)
  - Summer (DST): UTC+3 (EEST)
- Postal code: 47462

Krasnoluka (Ukrainian: Краснолука) is a village in Ukraine, Ternopil Oblast, Kremenets Raion, Lanivtsi urban hromada. After the liquidation of the Lanivtsi Raion on 19 July 2020, the village became part of the Kremenets Raion.

== Bibliography ==
- (in Ukrainian) Н. Смосюк, В. Уніят., Краснолука // Ternopil Encyclopedic Dictionary: in 4 v. / editorial board: H. Yavorskyi and other, Ternopil: "Zbruch", 2005, V. 2: К—О, S. 219. — ISBN 966-528-199-2.
- "Krasnołuka". Geographical Dictionary of the Kingdom of Poland (in Polish). p. 160.
