= Plyska, Ternopil Oblast =

Rural locality in Ternopil Oblast, Ukraine

Plyska Плиска
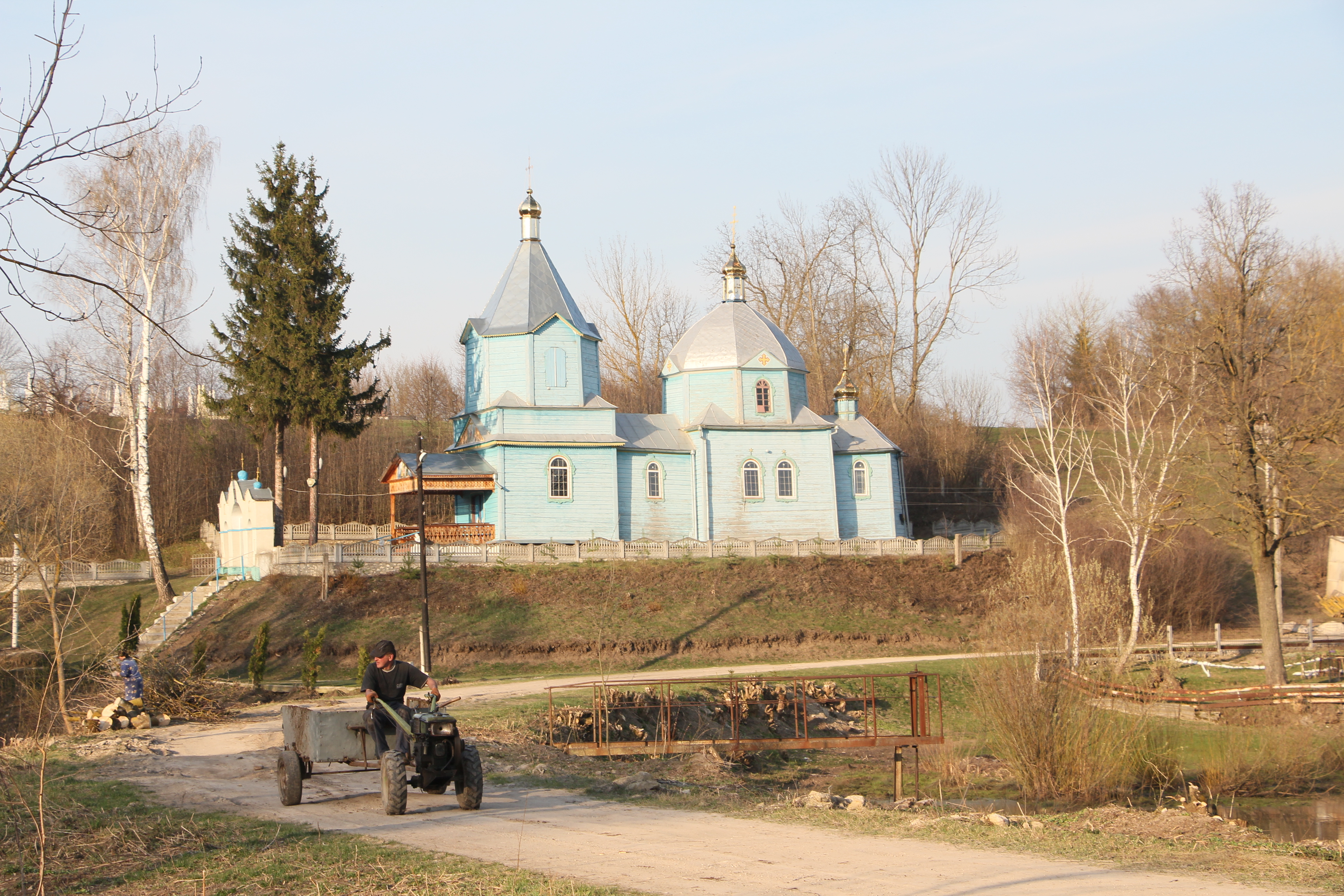
- Wooden church in the village of Plyska, Lanovets district, Ternopil region
- Interactive map of Plyska
- Location in Ternopil Oblast Plyska (Ternopil Oblast)
- Coordinates: 49°44′39″N 26°5′40″E
- Country: Ukraine
- Oblast: Ternopil Oblast
- Raion: Kremenets Raion
- Hromada: Lanivtsi urban hromada

Population (2007)
  - Total: 263
- Time zone: UTC+2 (EET)
  - Summer (DST): UTC+3 (EEST)
- Postal code: 47454

Plyska (Ukrainian: Плиска) is a village in Ukraine, Ternopil Oblast, Kremenets Raion, Lanivtsi urban hromada. After the liquidation of the Lanivtsi Raion on 19 July 2020, the village became part of the Kremenets Raion.

== Bibliography ==
- "Pliska". Geographical Dictionary of the Kingdom of Poland (in Polish). p. 458.
