= Shushkivtsi =

Rural locality in Ternopil Oblast, Ukraine

Shushkivtsi Шушківці
- Interactive map of Shushkivtsi
- Location in Ternopil Oblast Shushkivtsi (Ternopil Oblast)
- Coordinates: 49°46′50″N 26°8′45″E
- Country: Ukraine
- Oblast: Ternopil Oblast
- Raion: Kremenets Raion
- Hromada: Lanivtsi urban hromada

Population (2007)
  - Total: 231
- Time zone: UTC+2 (EET)
  - Summer (DST): UTC+3 (EEST)
- Postal code: 47453

Shushkivtsi (Ukrainian: Шушківці) is a village in Ukraine, Ternopil Oblast, Kremenets Raion, Lanivtsi urban hromada. After the liquidation of the Lanivtsi Raion on 19 July 2020, the village became part of the Kremenets Raion.

== Bibliography ==
- (in Ukrainian) Г. Басюк., Шушківці // Ternopil Encyclopedic Dictionary: in 4 v. / editorial board: H. Yavorskyi and other, Ternopil: "Zbruch", 2008, V. 3: П—Я, S. 664. — ISBN 978-966-528-279-2.
- "Szuszkowce, powiat krzemieniecki". Geographical Dictionary of the Kingdom of Poland (in Polish). 12. Warszawa: Kasa im. Józefa Mianowskiego. 1892. p. 82.
- "Szuszkowce, powiat krzemieniecki". Geographical Dictionary of the Kingdom of Poland (in Polish). p. 647.
