= Mala Karnachivka =

Rural locality in Ternopil Oblast, Ukraine

Mala Karnachivka Мала Карначівка
- Interactive map of Mala Karnachivka
- Location in Ternopil Oblast Mala Karnachivka (Ternopil Oblast)
- Coordinates: 49°48′13″N 26°4′44″E
- Country: Ukraine
- Oblast: Ternopil Oblast
- Raion: Kremenets Raion
- Hromada: Lanivtsi urban hromada
- Time zone: UTC+2 (EET)
  - Summer (DST): UTC+3 (EEST)
- Postal code: 47442

Mala Karnachivka (Ukrainian: Мала Карначівка) is a village in Ukraine, Ternopil Oblast, Kremenets Raion, Lanivtsi urban hromada. After the liquidation of the Lanivtsi Raion on 19 July 2020, the village became part of the Kremenets Raion.

== Bibliography ==
- (in Ukrainian) Лисак Т., Хаварівський Б., Мала Карначівка // Ternopil Encyclopedic Dictionary: in 4 v. / editorial board: H. Yavorskyi and other, Ternopil: "Zbruch", 2005, V. 2: К—О, S. 437. — ISBN 966-528-199-2.
- "Kornaczówka (1), pow. krzemieniecki". Geographical Dictionary of the Kingdom of Poland (in Polish). p. 677.
- "o wsi w h. Wanżułów". Geographical Dictionary of the Kingdom of Poland (in Polish). p. 677.
