= Vyshhorodok =

Rural locality in Ternopil Oblast, Ukraine

Vyshhorodok Вишгородок
- Church of the Nativity of the Virgin Mary
- Interactive map of Vyshhorodok
- Location in Ternopil Oblast Vyshhorodok (Ternopil Oblast)
- Coordinates: 49°46′10″N 25°58′32″E
- Country: Ukraine
- Oblast: Ternopil Oblast
- Raion: Kremenets Raion
- Hromada: Lanivtsi urban hromada
- Time zone: UTC+2 (EET)
  - Summer (DST): UTC+3 (EEST)
- Postal code: 47432

Vyshhorodok (Ukrainian: Вишгородок; Polish: Wyszogródek) is a village in Ukraine, Ternopil Oblast, Kremenets Raion, Lanivtsi urban hromada. After the liquidation of the Lanivtsi Raion on 19 July 2020, the village became part of the Kremenets Raion.

== History ==
Following the German-Soviet invasion of Poland, which started World War II in September 1939, the village was occupied by the Soviet Union until 1941 and then by Germany until 1944. Five Polish policemen from the village were murdered by the Russians in the Katyn massacre in 1940. In 1944, it was re-occupied by the Soviet Union, and included within the Ukrainian Soviet Socialist Republic.

== Bibliography ==
- "Wyżgródek". Geographical Dictionary of the Kingdom of Poland (in Polish). p. 706.
