= Sokolivka, Ternopil Oblast =

Village in Ternopil Oblast, Ukraine

Sokolivka Соколівка
- Village
- Location within Ternopil Oblast Location within Ukraine
- Coordinates: 49°46′57″N 25°59′10″E
- Country: Ukraine
- Oblast: Ternopil Oblast
- Raion: Kremenets Raion

Population (2001)
  - Total: 226
- Time zone: UTC+2 (EET)
  - Summer (DST): UTC+3 (EEST)

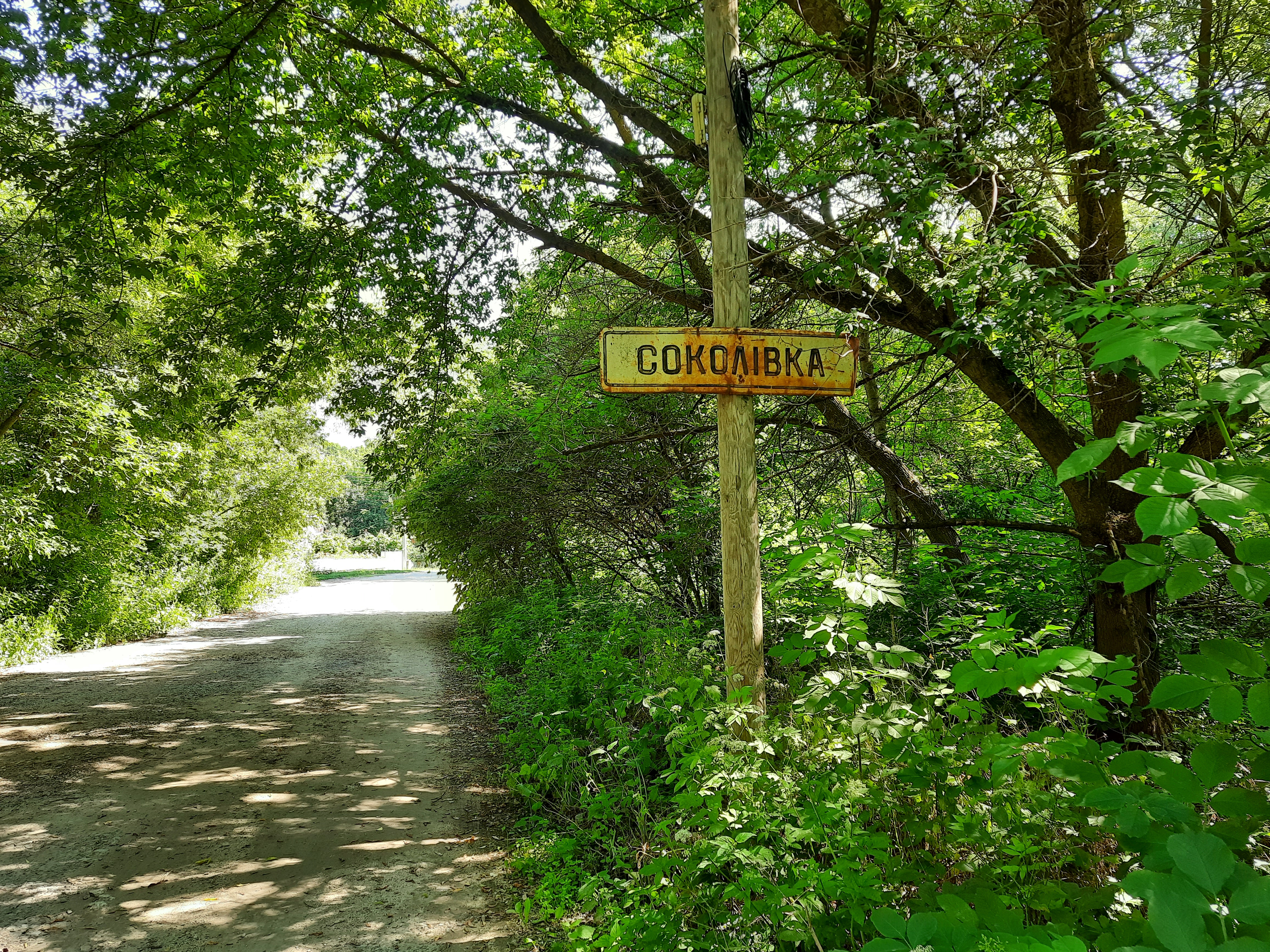

Sokolivka (Ukrainian: Соколівка) is a village in Kremenets Raion of Ternopil Oblast in Ukraine. It forms part of the Lanivtsi urban hromada, one of the hromadas of Ukraine.

Until 18 July 2020, Sokolivka was located in Lanivtsi Raion. The raion was abolished in July 2020 as part of the administrative reform of Ukraine, which reduced the number of raions of Ternopil Oblast to three. The area of Lanivtsi Raion was merged into Kremenets Raion.
