= Lopushne, Lanivtsi urban hromada, Kremenets Raion, Ternopil Oblast =

Rural locality in Ternopil Oblast, Ukraine

Lopushne Лопушне
- Interactive map of Lopushne
- Location in Ternopil Oblast Lopushne (Ternopil Oblast)
- Coordinates: 49°45′0″N 25°53′8″E
- Country: Ukraine
- Oblast: Ternopil Oblast
- Raion: Kremenets Raion
- Hromada: Lanivtsi urban hromada
- Time zone: UTC+2 (EET)
  - Summer (DST): UTC+3 (EEST)
- Postal code: 47433

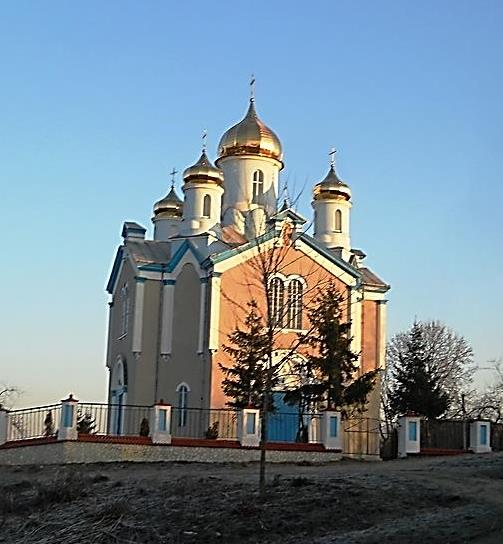
Church in Lopushne

Lopushne (Ukrainian: Лопушне) is a village in Ukraine, Ternopil Oblast, Kremenets Raion, Lanivtsi urban hromada. After the liquidation of the Lanivtsi Raion on 19 July 2020, the village became part of the Kremenets Raion.

== Bibliography ==
- (in Ukrainian) Комінко В., Мельничук Б., Лопушне // Ternopil Encyclopedic Dictionary: in 4 v. / editorial board: H. Yavorskyi and other, Ternopil: "Zbruch", 2005, V. 2: К—О, S. 392. — ISBN 966-528-199-2.
- "Łopuszna Wierzbowiecka, wś rządowa, pow. krzemieniecki". Geographical Dictionary of the Kingdom of Poland (in Polish). 5. Warszawa: Kasa im. Józefa Mianowskiego. 1884. p. 728.
- "2) Łopuszno, Łopuszna". Geographical Dictionary of the Kingdom of Poland (in Polish). p. 273.
