= Berezhanka, Kremenets Raion, Ternopil Oblast =

Rural locality in Ternopil Oblast, Ukraine

Berezhanka Бережанка
- Interactive map of Berezhanka
- Location in Ternopil Oblast Berezhanka (Ternopil Oblast)
- Coordinates: 49°49′34″N 26°0′23″E
- Country: Ukraine
- Oblast: Ternopil Oblast
- Raion: Kremenets Raion
- Hromada: Lanivtsi urban hromada
- Time zone: UTC+2 (EET)
  - Summer (DST): UTC+3 (EEST)
- Postal code: 47440

Berezhanka (Ukrainian: Бережанка) is a village in Ukraine, Ternopil Oblast, Kremenets Raion, Lanivtsi urban hromada. After the liquidation of the Lanivtsi Raion on 19 July 2020, the village became part of the Kremenets Raion.

== Bibliography ==
- (in Ukrainian) Басюк Г., Бережанка // Ternopil Encyclopedic Dictionary: in 4 v. / editorial board: H. Yavorskyi and other, Ternopil: "Zbruch", 2004, V. 1: А—Й, 696 s. — ISBN 966-528-197-6.
- "Domaninka albo Bereżanka". Geographical Dictionary of the Kingdom of Poland (in Polish). 2. Warszawa: Kasa im. Józefa Mianowskiego. 1881. p. 113.
