= Zhukivtsi, Kremenets Raion, Ternopil Oblast =

Rural locality in Ternopil Oblast, Ukraine

Zhukivtsi Жуківці
- Interactive map of Zhukivtsi
- Location in Ternopil Oblast Zhukivtsi (Ternopil Oblast)
- Coordinates: 49°47′56″N 26°0′30″E
- Country: Ukraine
- Oblast: Ternopil Oblast
- Raion: Kremenets Raion
- Hromada: Lanivtsi urban hromada
- Time zone: UTC+2 (EET)
  - Summer (DST): UTC+3 (EEST)
- Postal code: 47440

Zhukivtsi (Ukrainian: Жуківці) is a village in Ukraine, Ternopil Oblast, Kremenets Raion, Lanivtsi urban hromada. After the liquidation of the Lanivtsi Raion on 19 July 2020, the village became part of the Kremenets Raion.

== Bibliography ==
- (in Ukrainian) Г. Басюк, Г. Дадюк., Жуківці // Ternopil Encyclopedic Dictionary: in 4 v. / editorial board: H. Yavorskyi and other, Ternopil: "Zbruch", 2008, V. 3: П—Я, S. 582. — ISBN 978-966-528-279-2.
- "Żukowce, wś, pow. krzemieniecki". Geographical Dictionary of the Kingdom of Poland (in Polish). p. 727.
