= Vlashchyntsi =

Rural locality in Ternopil Oblast, Ukraine

Vlashchyntsi Влащинці
- Interactive map of Vlashchyntsi
- Location in Ternopil Oblast Vlashchyntsi (Ternopil Oblast)
- Coordinates: 49°47′15″N 25°56′2″E
- Country: Ukraine
- Oblast: Ternopil Oblast
- Raion: Kremenets Raion
- Hromada: Lanivtsi urban hromada
- Time zone: UTC+2 (EET)
  - Summer (DST): UTC+3 (EEST)
- Postal code: 47432

Vlashchyntsi (Ukrainian: Влащинці; Polish: Właszczyńce) is a village in Ukraine, Ternopil Oblast, Kremenets Raion, Lanivtsi urban hromada. After the liquidation of the Lanivtsi Raion on 19 July 2020, the village became part of the Kremenets Raion.

== Bibliography ==
- (in Ukrainian) В. Уніят., Влащинці // Ternopil Encyclopedic Dictionary: in 4 v. / editorial board: H. Yavorskyi and other, Ternopil: "Zbruch", 2004, V. 1: А—Й, S. 289—290. — ISBN 966-528-197-6.
- "Właszczyńce, wś, powiat krzemieniecki, gmina Wyszogródek". Geographical Dictionary of the Kingdom of Poland (in Polish). 13. Warszawa: Kasa im. Józefa Mianowskiego. 1893. p. 696.
- "Właszczyńce, wś, powiat krzemieniecki". Geographical Dictionary of the Kingdom of Poland (in Polish). p. 693.
