= Tataryntsi =

Rural locality in Ternopil Oblast, Ukraine

Tataryntsi Татаринці
- Interactive map of Tataryntsi
- Location in Ternopil Oblast Tataryntsi (Ternopil Oblast)
- Coordinates: 49°55′48″N 26°2′35″E
- Country: Ukraine
- Oblast: Ternopil Oblast
- Raion: Kremenets Raion
- Hromada: Lanivtsi urban hromada

Population (2007)
  - Total: 471
- Time zone: UTC+2 (EET)
  - Summer (DST): UTC+3 (EEST)
- Postal code: 47420

Tataryntsi (Ukrainian: Татаринці) is a village in Ukraine, Ternopil Oblast, Kremenets Raion, Lanivtsi urban hromada. After the liquidation of the Lanivtsi Raion on 19 July 2020, the village became part of the Kremenets Raion.

== Bibliography ==
- (in Ukrainian) Г. Басюк., Татаринці // Ternopil Encyclopedic Dictionary: in 4 v. / editorial board: H. Yavorskyi and other, Ternopil: "Zbruch", 2008, V. 3: П—Я, S. 387. — ISBN 978-966-528-279-2.
