= Pechirna =

Rural locality in Ternopil Oblast, Ukraine

Pechirna Печірна
- Interactive map of Pechirna
- Location in Ternopil Oblast Pechirna (Ternopil Oblast)
- Coordinates: 49°44′25″N 26°0′50″E
- Country: Ukraine
- Oblast: Ternopil Oblast
- Raion: Kremenets Raion
- Hromada: Lanivtsi urban hromada

Population (2007)
  - Total: 286
- Time zone: UTC+2 (EET)
  - Summer (DST): UTC+3 (EEST)
- Postal code: 47444

Pechirna (Ukrainian: Печірна) is a village in Ukraine, Ternopil Oblast, Kremenets Raion, Lanivtsi urban hromada. After the liquidation of the Lanivtsi Raion on 19 July 2020, the village became part of the Kremenets Raion.

== Bibliography ==
- (in Ukrainian) Г. Басюк, В. Довгалюк, В. Уніят., Печірна // Ternopil Encyclopedic Dictionary: in 4 v. / editorial board: H. Yavorskyi and other, Ternopil: "Zbruch", 2008, V. 3: П—Я, S. 62. — ISBN 978-966-528-279-2.
- "Peczerno, al. Peczerna, Pieczurna". Geographical Dictionary of the Kingdom of Poland (in Polish). p. 436.
- "Pieczurna, pow. krzemieniecki, ob. Peczerno". Geographical Dictionary of the Kingdom of Poland (in Polish). p. 444.
