= Lanivtsi urban hromada =

Urban hromada in Ternopil Oblast, Ukraine

Lanivtsi urban hromada Лановецька міська громада
- hromada
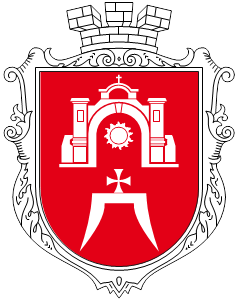
- Seal

- Location within Ternopil Oblast Location within Ukraine
- Coordinates: 49°49′30″N 26°04′30″E
- Country: Ukraine
- Oblast: Ternopil Oblast
- Raion: Kremenets Raion
- Administrative center: Lanivtsi

Government
  - Hromada head: Roman Kaznovetskyi

Area
  - Total: 134.6 km^{2} (52.0 sq mi)

Population (2022)
  - Total: 21,442
- City: 1
- Villages: 40
- Website: lanmisto.gov.ua

Lanivtsi urban territorial hromada (Ukrainian: Лановецька територіальна громада, romanized: Lanovetska miska terytorialna hromada) is a hromada in Ukraine, in Kremenets Raion of Ternopil Oblast. The administrative center is the city of Lanivtsi. Its population is 21,442 (2022 estimate) It was formed on 24 May 2017.

== Settlements ==
The hromada consists of one city (Lanivtsi) and forty villages:

- Berezhanka
- Bilozirka
- Buhliv
- Hrybova
- Hrynky
- Ivankivtsi
- Korostova
- Korzhkivtsi
- Kozachky
- Krasnoluka
- Kutyska
- Liulyntsi
- Lopushne
- Mala Bilka
- Mala Karnachivka
- Mali Kuskivtsi
- Martyshkivtsi
- Molotkiv
- Moskalivka
- Mykhailivka
- Ohryzkivtsi
- Oryshkivtsi
- Osnyky
- Pakhynia
- Pechirna
- Plyska
- Shushkivtsi
- Sokolivka
- Tataryntsi
- Vanzhuliv
- Velyka Bilka
- Verbovets
- Vereshchaky
- Vlashchyntsi
- Volytsia
- Vyshhorodok
- Yakymivtsi
- Yuskivtsi
- Zahirtsi
- Zhukivtsi
