= Bilozirka, Ternopil Oblast =

Coordinates: 49°46′N 26°11′E

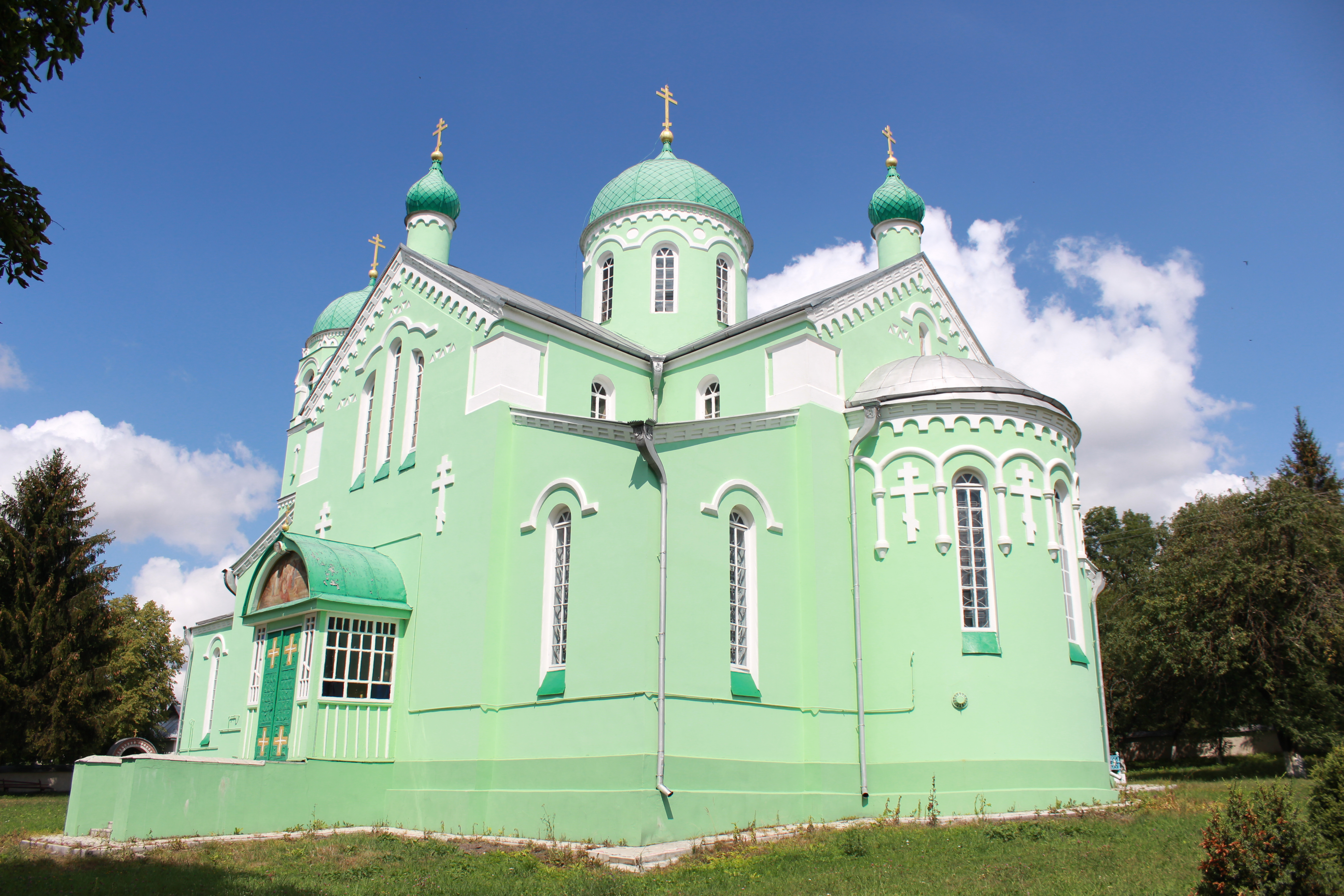
Church in the village

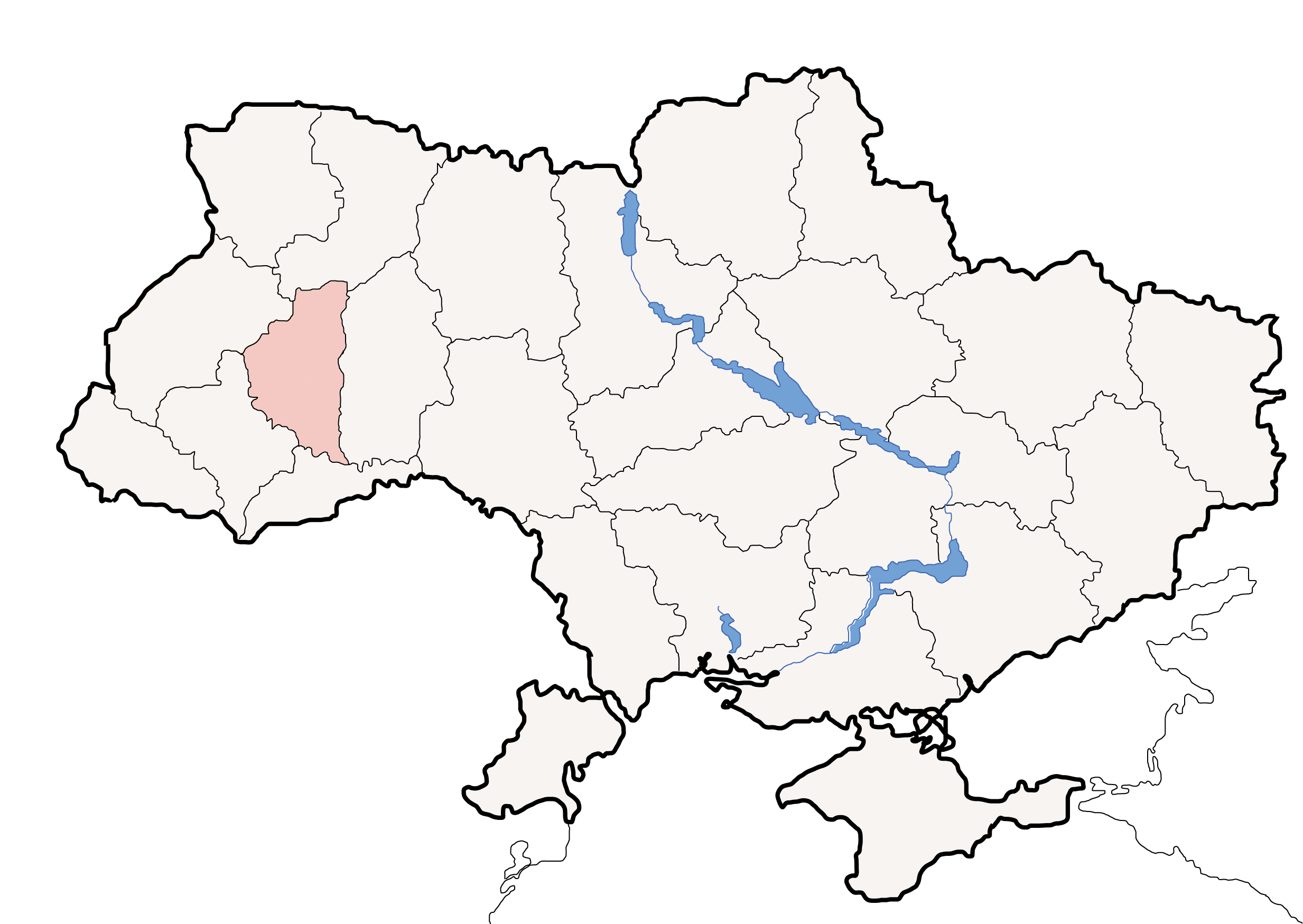
Ternopil Oblast is located in Ukraine.

Bilozirka (Ukrainian: Білозірка; Polish: Białozórka; Yiddish: בילעזערקע, romanized: Bilezerke), also called Belozërka (Russian: Белозёрка), is a village in Kremenets Raion, Ternopil Oblast in western Ukraine. It belongs to Lanivtsi urban hromada, one of the hromadas of Ukraine.

== History ==
Bilozirka has been documented as a settlement since 1545. It was in an area where rule changed over the centuries. Ashkenazi Jews settled here beginning in the early 18th century, when it was part of the Russian Empire.

In 1900, the Jewish population was 1,070, and the total village population was about 2500. Many Jewish communities, known as shtetls, were within 8 to 26 miles of Bilozirka. Numerous Jews emigrated to the United States in the early 20th century, up until about 1921. During the 1920s, more than 100 Jews migrated to Palestine. By the late 1920s, Jews numbered 874, among a total village population of 2,331.

In July 1941, during World War II, Germany invaded the Soviet Union, including this village and region. Its forces occupied the village. In the first week of occupation, Nazi forces murdered several Jewish girls of the village. Soon, the Germans created a Judenrat, who were ordered to collect and transfer ransom payments to them. On February 28, 1942, the Jews of the city were taken to the Lanowce ghetto, where they were used in forced labor. On August 13–14, 1942, the Germans murdered nearly all of the Jews from the ghetto in mass executions. About 20 Jews of the city survived the Holocaust.

Until 18 July 2020, Bilozirka belonged to Lanivtsi Raion. The raion was abolished in July 2020 as part of the administrative reform of Ukraine, which reduced the number of raions of Ternopil Oblast to three. The area of Lanivtsi Raion was merged into Kremenets Raion.

== Administration ==
Time	Name	District	Province	Country
Before World War I (c. 1900)	Belozirka	Kremenets	Volhynia	Russian Empire
Between the wars (c. 1930)	Białozórka	Krzemieniec	Wołyń	Poland
After World War II (c. 1950)	Belozerka	Kremenets Raion	Ternopil Oblast	Ukrainian SSR, Soviet Union
After the USSR ended (since 1991) 2020	Bilozirka	Lanivtsi Raion	Ternopil Oblast	Ukraine
After 2020	Bilozirka	Kremenets Raion	Ternopil Oblast	Ukraine
