= Volytsia, Lanivtsi urban hromada, Kremenets Raion, Ternopil Oblast =

Rural locality in Ternopil Oblast, Ukraine

Volytsia Волиця
- Interactive map of Volytsia
- Location in Ternopil Oblast Volytsia (Ternopil Oblast)
- Coordinates: 49°50′29″N 26°3′4″E
- Country: Ukraine
- Oblast: Ternopil Oblast
- Raion: Kremenets Raion
- Hromada: Lanivtsi urban hromada
- Time zone: UTC+2 (EET)
  - Summer (DST): UTC+3 (EEST)
- Postal code: 47402

Volytsia (Ukrainian: Волиця; Polish: Wolica) is a village in Ukraine, Ternopil Oblast, Kremenets Raion, Lanivtsi urban hromada. After the liquidation of the Lanivtsi Raion on 19 July 2020, the village became part of the Kremenets Raion.

== Bibliography ==
- (in Ukrainian) Уніят В., Волиця // Ternopil Encyclopedic Dictionary: in 4 v. / editorial board: H. Yavorskyi and other, Ternopil: "Zbruch", 2004, V. 1: А—Й, S. 297. — ISBN 966-528-197-6.
- "Wolica (6)". Geographical Dictionary of the Kingdom of Poland (in Polish). 13. Warszawa: Kasa im. Józefa Mianowskiego. 1893. p. 831.
- "Wolica (8)". Geographical Dictionary of the Kingdom of Poland (in Polish). p. 698.
