= Bohdan Melnychuk (writer and translator) =

Ukrainian philologist, poet and translator (1937–2025)

Bohdan Ivanovych Melnychuk (Ukrainian: Богда́н Іва́нович Мельничу́к; 19 February 1937 – 21 July 2025) was a Ukrainian philologist, poet, publicist, journalist, teacher and translator.

== Life and career ==
Melnychuk was born on 19 February 1937 in the village of Oleshkiv, Zabolotiv hromada in the Sniatyn Raion. After graduating from the Faculty of Philology at Chernivtsi University, he worked as a teacher, and journalist of the regional newspaper "Soviet Bukovyna".

In 1959, he published a collection of poems titled "Flourish, my land!".

In 2009 he was awarded the Honored Worker of Education of Ukraine.

Melnychuk died on 21 July 2025, at the age of 88.
