= Bohdan Melnychuk (writer and local historian) =

Ukrainian writer, local historian (born 1952)

- Богдан Іванович Мельничук
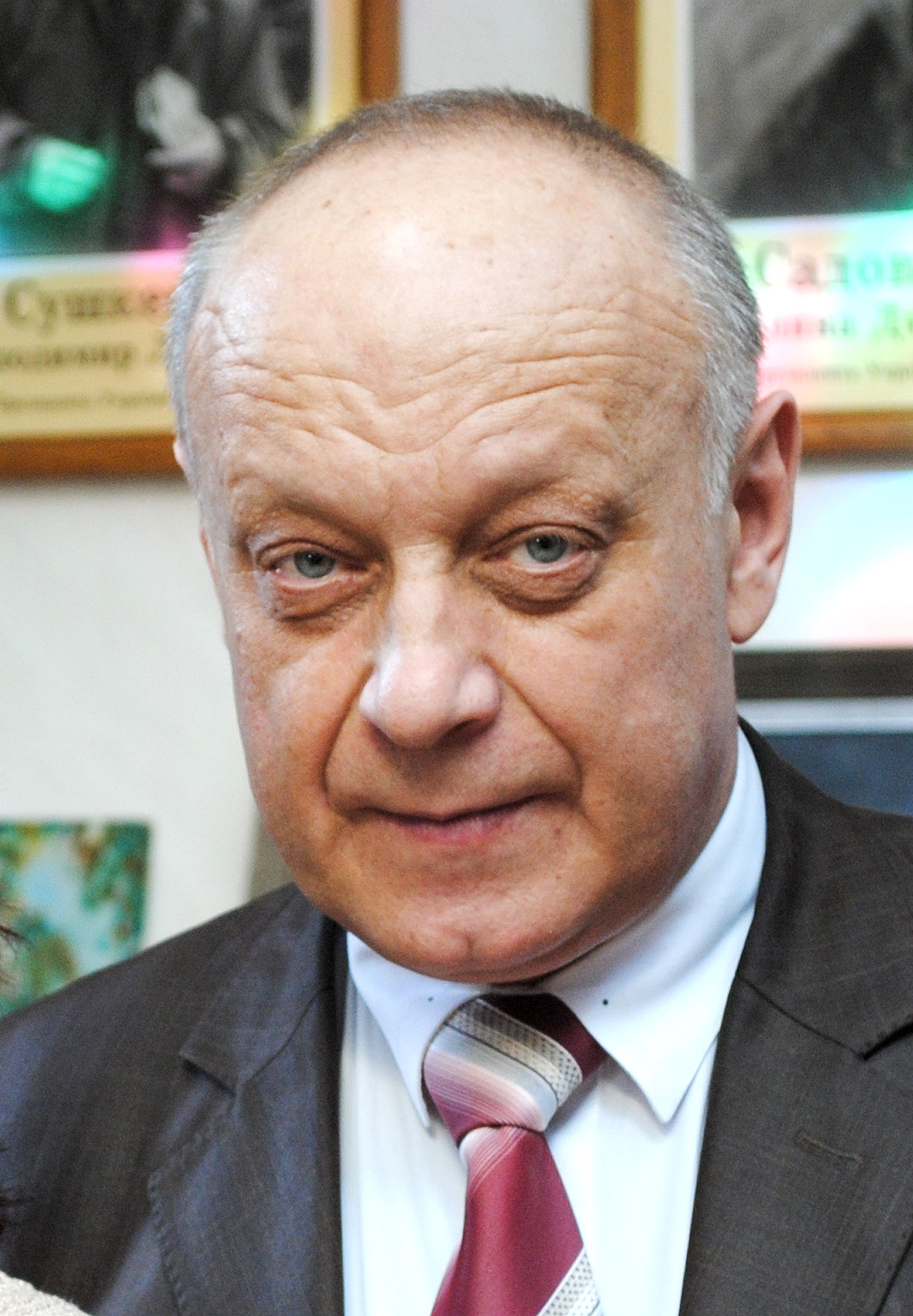
- Born: 2 August 1952 (age 74); Molotkiv, now Kremenets Raion, Ternopil Oblast, Ukraine
- Other names: B. Volynskyi, I. Havryltso i B. Zherdyniuk (Б. Волинський, І. Гаврильцьо і Б. Жердинюк)
- Education: University of Lviv
- Occupations: Writer, playwright, editor, journalist, local historian.
- Awards: Merited Figure of Arts of Ukraine; Honorary Citizen of Ternopil

Bohdan Melnychuk (Ukrainian: Богдан Іванович Мельничук; born 2 August 1952) is a Ukrainian writer, playwright, editor, journalist, local historian. Member of the National Unions of Journalists (1980), Writers' (1998), and Local Historians of Ukraine (1998), full member of the Shevchenko Scientific Society (2017).

== Biography ==
Bohdan Melnychuk was born on 2 August 1952, in the Molotkiv, now Kremenets Raion, Ternopil Oblast.

In 1974, he graduated from the Faculty of Journalism of University of Lviv.

He worked for the editorial offices of the newspapers "Holos Lanovechchyny", "Vilne Zhyttia" and "Ternopil Vechirnii" (both in Ternopil), in the State Archives of Ternopil Oblast, and was involved in public work.

Subsequently, he was the chief editor of the Ternopil Oblast Department for Press and Information (1989–1993), the publishing house of the Ternopil Academy of National Economy, "Ekonomichna Dumka" (1998–2003), the literary, artistic, and cultural newspaper "Rusalka Dnistrova" (from 1992 to the present) and the magazine "Ternopil" (from 1994 to the present; from 2009 – "Literaturnyi Ternopil").

From 2003 to 2009, he was the Deputy Head of the editorial board and the Chief Scientific Editor of Ukraine's first regional 4-volume "Ternopil Encyclopedic Dictionary".

From 2010 to 2014, he was the Chief Scientific Editor of the municipal enterprise "Ternopil Oblast Information and Tourist Local History Center," and the Executive Secretary of the editorial board for the 3-volume encyclopedic edition "Ternopilshchyna: History of Cities and Villages".

Currently, he is the chief editor of the magazine "Literaturnyi Ternopil".

From 2016 to 2021, he headed the Public Council for the awarding of the Brothers Lepky Prize [1].

== Creativity ==
He has published 38 of his own books of drama, prose, and poetry, including "Vybrani Novely" (1999), collections of novellas "Profesor i Bychok Bamburka" (2002), "Skrypka vid Staroho" (2004), "Yar" (2007), a two-volume collection of selected novellas "Sud bez Sudu" and "Zek, Vozhd i Harsia Lorka" (2010), the novella "Roksoliana, Dekan i Zhloby" (co-authored with Nina Fialko), the documentary novella "Solomiia Krushelnytska" (both 2011); collections of poems with parallel translation into Esperanto "Krapelyny-plus", "Novi Krapelyny" (both 2002), poetry collections "Vasha Presvitloste, Damo..." (2005), "Marii" (2006), "Taina Kokhannia" (2007), collections of plays "Aktor i Blazni" (2009), "Dovha Doroha v Korotkyi Den", "Rekviiem dlia Klarneta bez Orkestru" (both 2010), "Kava na Lezi Shabli" (2011), and others.

He is the author and co-author of 36 local history books, including: "Ternopil. Shcho? De? Yak?" (1989), "Bil i Pamiat Molotkova" (1990), "Taras Shevchenko na Ternopilshchyni" (1990, 1998, 2007), "Shliakhamy Bohdana Khmelnytskoho na Ternopilshchyni" (1991), "Za Ridnyi Krai, za Narid Svii..." (1993), "Shliakhamy Striletskoi Slavy" (1995), "Symon Petliura i Ternopilshchyna" (2009), "Velykyi Ukrainets iz Ternopillia. Yaroslav Stetsko. Zhyttievyi Shliakh Providnyka OUN" (2010), "Virna Dochka Ukrainy. Slava Stetsko: Zhyttiepis u Borotbi", "Ivan Franko i Ternopilshchyna", "Vid Makivky do Strypy" (all 2011).

In theaters across Ukraine (T. H. Shevchenko Ternopil Academic Drama Theatre, Yurii Drohobych Lviv Musical-Dramatic Theatre, Ivan Ozarkevych Kolomyia Theater, Rivne Academic Drama Theater, Ternopil Oblast Theater Actor and Puppets, Mariika Pidhirianka Ivano-Frankivsk Academic Puppet Theatre, and folk theaters: Bohdan Lepky Kopychyntsi Theater, Ozerna Theater of Zboriv Raion, "Dyvosvit" of Ternopil Secondary School No 22, and others), 32 plays and stage adaptations by Melnychuk have been staged.

The play "Mazepa, Hetman of Ukraine" (a stage adaptation by Melnychuk based on the works of Bohdan Lepky, staged at the Taras Shevchenko Dnipro Academic Ukrainian Music and Drama Theatre) was awarded the International Petro Orlyk Prize (1995).

On 12 December 2010, the premiere of the play "Mazepa" based on the works of Bohdan Lepky (stage adaptation by B. Melnychuk and O. Mosiichuk) took place at the T. H. Shevchenko Ternopil Academic Drama Theatre; it was awarded the regional Halytska Melpomena Prize.

Theatrical productions based on B. Melnychuk's plays "Charivni Pyrizhky Chervonoi Shapochky" (co-authored with S. Lvivska), "Kozatski Vitryla", and others have been awarded prizes at theater festivals.

Among the plays based on B. Melnychuk scripts are "Solomiya Krushelnytska", "Vista-Vio!" (based on Riflemen's humor), stage adaptations of works by R. Zavadovych, P. Zahrebelnyi, B. Lepky, A. J. Cronin, V. Tarnovskyi, I. Fylypchak, and others.

He is the author of hundreds of articles, essays, reviews, and other publications in the media.

He is the compiler and editor of over 500 collections, including works by Stefan Balei, Oleksandr and Bohdan Barvinskyi (father and son), Viacheslav Budzynovskyi, Volodymyr Vykhruch, Osyp Nazaruk, and Matvii Stakhiv.

Over 100 songs with lyrics by Melnychuk and music by Ihor Andrukhiv, Mykola Bolotnyi, V. Voinarskyi, Anatolii Horchynskyi, Y. Horishnyi, Yaroslav Zlonkevych, O. Zozulia, B. Klymchuk, Leonid Miller, I. Mykolaichuk, M. Obleshchuk, and other composers have been published in the collections "Sad Liubovi" (2009), and "Sad Liubovi—2" (2010). They are performed by L. Butenko, Volodymyr Verminskyi, Ihor Vovchak, Andriy Hambal, Stepan Hiha, Lesia-Matskiv-Horlytska, S. Derii, M. Dovhalov, Vitalii Svyryd, Oleksandr Smyk, Y. Shevchuk, and other artists. Song works with Melnychuk lyrics have been recognized at the "Pisennyi Vernisazh" competitions (2009, 2011), "Chervona Kalyna" (2009, 2010, 2011), "Melodii Pidkamenia" (2010, 2011), "Lira Hippokrata" (2010), and "Ukrainska Rodyna" (2010).

The book by Ivan Bandurka, "Chotyry Vezhi Bohdana Melnychuka (Ternopil, 2002), tells the story of the writer's life and work.

A bibliographic index "Bohdan Melnychuk – Writer, Editor, Journalist, Local Historian" (Ternopil, vol. 1, 2009; vol. 2, 2012) has been published.

== Works ==
=== Own works ===
He has published over 25 books of drama, prose, and poetry, including:

- "Vybrani Novely" (1999);
- "Profesor i Bychok Bamburka" (collection of novellas, 2002);
- "Skrypka vid Staroho" (collection of novellas, 2004);
- "Yar" (collection of novellas, 2007);
- "Krapelyny-plus" (poems with parallel translation into Esperanto, 2000, 2002);
- "Novi Krapelyny" (2002), poems with parallel translation into Esperanto;
- "Vasha Presvitloste, Damo..." (poetry, 2005);
- "Sad Liubovi" – 1 (songs, 2009);
- "Sad Liubovi" – 2 (songs, 2010);
- "Zek, Vozhd i Harsia Lorka" (collection of novellas, 2010);
- "Sud bez Sudu" (collection of novellas, 2010);
- "Slova vid Sertsia", vols. 1–2 (selected poetry, 2010);
- "Doroha do Sebe" (new novellas, plays, radio plays, 2012);
- "Portret Zblyzka v Riznykh Inter'yerakh" (new novellas, 2012);
- "Pereity na Druhyi Bereh" (new novellas, poetry, plays, songs, articles, 2014);
- "Kozatskoho Rodu" (songbook for children of junior, middle, and senior ages, 2015);
- "Khlibyna dlia Banderivtsia" (novellas, poetry, aphorisms, 2016);
- "Kachenia Pushok i Zaderykuvatyi Pivnik" (play).

=== Co-authored works ===
He is the author and co-author of 15 local history books, including:

- "Ternopil. Shcho? De? Yak?" (1989);
- "Bil i Pamiat Molotkova" (1990);
- "Taras Shevchenko na Ternopilshchyni" (1990, 1998, 2007);
- "Shliakhamy Bohdana Khmelnytskoho na Ternopilshchyni" (1991);
- "Vid Makivky do Strypy" (2010);
- "Za Ridnyi Krai za Narid Svii..." (1993);
- "Shlyakhamy Striletskoi Slavy" (1995);
- "Zhuravlyna" Knyha, part 3 (1999–2012);
- "Kokhannia do Nestiamy" (adventure-romance novel, 2013);
- The play "Mazepa, Hetman of Ukraine" (stage adaptation by B. Melnychuk based on the works of B. Lepky, Dnipro Academic Ukrainian Music and Drama Theater named after Taras Shevchenko) was awarded the International Pylyp Orlyk Prize (1995);
- Plays: "Solomiya Krushelnytska," "Vista-Vio!" based on Riflemen's humor;
- The play "Chotyry Charivni Perlyny";
- The play "Charivni Pyrizhky Chervonoyi Shapochky";
- Stage adaptations of works by R. Zavadovych, P. Zahrebelnyi, B. Lepky.

== Awards ==
State Awards:

- Merited Figure of Arts of Ukraine (18 August 2008).
- 20 Years of Independence of Ukraine Medal (19 August 2011)

Prizes:

- Ivanna Blazhkevych Prize (1994);
- Brothers Lepky Prize (2000);
- Ulas Samchuk Prize (2002);
- Stanislav Dnistryanskyi Prize (2003);
- 2nd Prize of the First (2007), Special Prize of the Third (2009), 3rd Prize of the Fourth (2010, jointly with N. Koltun) All-Ukrainian Radio Play Competitions "Let's Revive the Forgotten Genre";
- 2nd and 3rd Prizes of the All-Ukrainian Literary Competition "Koronatsiia Slova-2010" in the "Drama" nomination for the plays "Rekviiem dlia Klarneta bez Orkestru" (jointly with O. Mosiichuk) and "Vishchyi Son, abo Mudryi Ivanko" (jointly with V. Frolenkov); Diploma Winner of "Koronatsiia Slova—2012, 2013, 2014, 2015" in various genres;
- Iryna Vilde Prize (2008);
- "Statehood Position" Prize (2009);
- Hryhorii Skovoroda International Literary Prize "Garden of Divine Songs" (2010);
- Volynets-Shvabinskyi Foundation International Literary Prize for Ukrainian Studies at the Free Ukrainian University Foundation (USA, 2011);
- Yaroslav Stetsko Prize (2011);
- Roman Zavadovych Prize (2016);
- Dmytro Yavornytskyi Prize (2015);
- 1st Prize in the nomination "Kvitny, Movo Nasha Ridna" (Blossom, Our Native Language) of the XVI All-National Competition "Ukrainian Language — Language of Unity" (2015);
- Petro Medvedyk Prize — for the publication of the encyclopedic three-volume edition "Ternopilshchyna: History of Cities and Villages" (2015);
- Stepan Sapeliak Prize (2016).

Medals:

- Medal "Builder of Ukraine" of the All-Ukrainian Taras Shevchenko "Prosvita" Society (2008);
- Medal of Saints Cyril and Methodius of the UOC-KP (2010);
- Knight's Order "Ivan Sirko", 3rd class of the Ukrainian Free Cossacks (2012);
- Gold Medal of Ukrainian Journalism (2014).

Other awards:

- "Person of the Year"—2008 in Ternopil Oblast.
- First place in the literary competition "Woman in History" (2014);
- Special Award for the best work on military themes in the "Koronatsia Slova 2014" competition, "Song Lyrics" nomination, for the poem "Batko-Otaman" (Father-Ataman);
- Diploma Winner of the XIV (2010) and Laureate of the XV (2011), XVI (2012) and XIX (2015) All-Ukrainian Literary and Local History Competitions named after Myron Utrysko;
- Diploma Winner of the Volodymyr Vykhrushch Regional Competition (2002);
- Honorary Badge of the National Union of Journalists of Ukraine (2009);
- Honorary Award of the National Union of Writers of Ukraine (2009);
- Honorary Award of the Ternopil City Mayor (2011);
- Special Award "Choice of the General Producer of '1+1'" for the best screenplay in the "Koronatsiya Slova 2016" competition, for "Proliskam Snih Ne Strashnyi" (Snow is not Scary for Snowdrops) (co-authored with Valentyna Semeniak) (2016);
- Two-year State Stipend (2017);
- Honorary Citizen of Ternopil (2017).

== Bibliography ==
- Melnychuk Bohdan Ivanovych / M. H. Zhelezniak // Encyclopedia of Modern Ukraine [Online] / Eds. : I.М. Dziuba, A.I. Zhukovsky, M.H. Zhelezniak [et al.]; National Academy of Sciences of Ukraine, Shevchenko Scientific Society. – Kyiv: The NASU institute of Encyclopedic Research, 2018.
- Бандурка І. Чотири вежі Богдана Мельничука. — Тернопіль, 2002.
- (in Ukrainian) Барна В., Фроленков В., Мельничук Богдан Іванович // Ternopil Encyclopedic Dictionary: in 4 v. / editorial board: H. Yavorskyi and other, Ternopil: "Zbruch", 2005, V. 2: К—О, S. 498. — ISBN 966-528-199-2.
