= Poznań =

City in Greater Poland Voivodeship, Poland

- City county
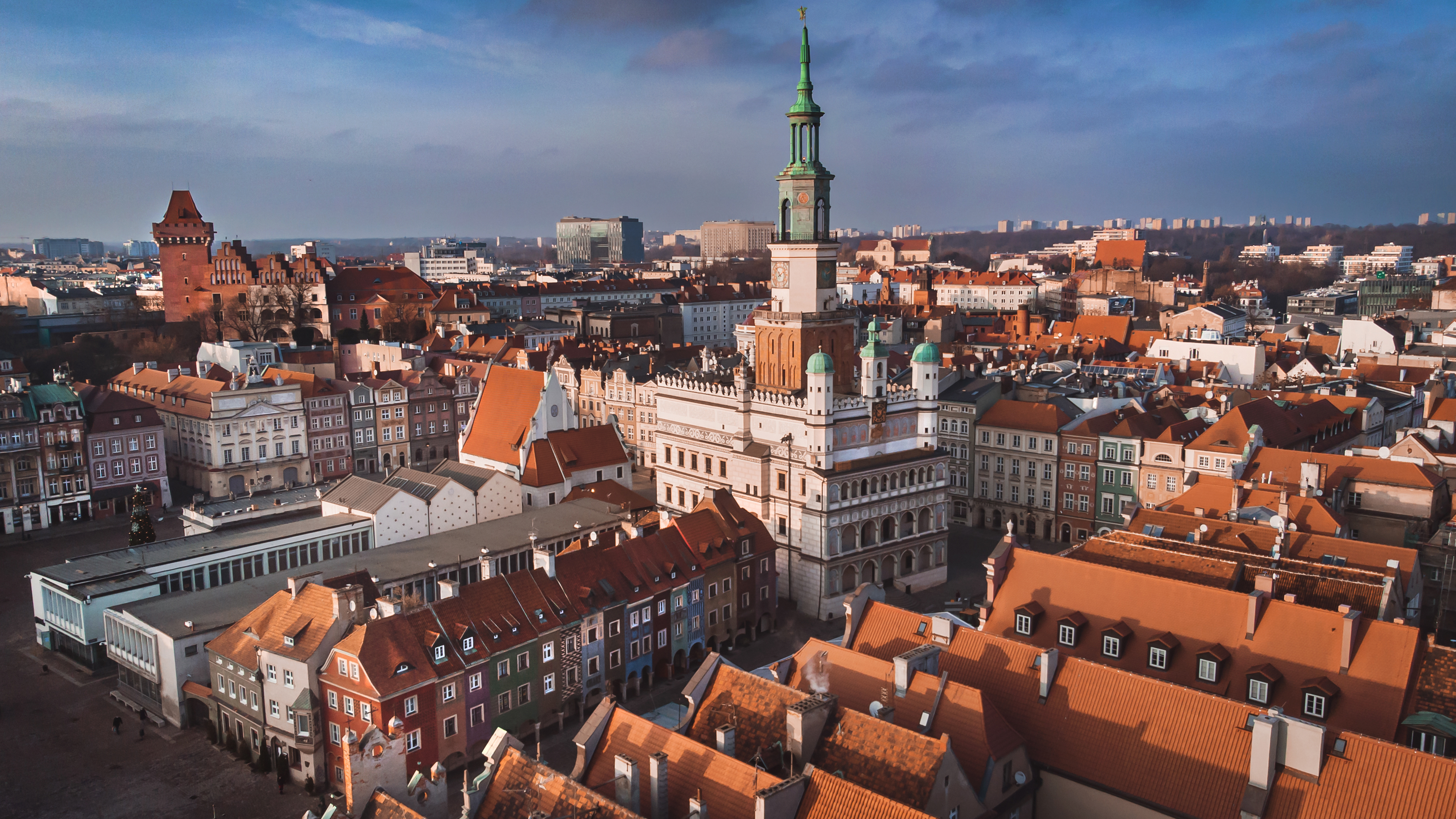
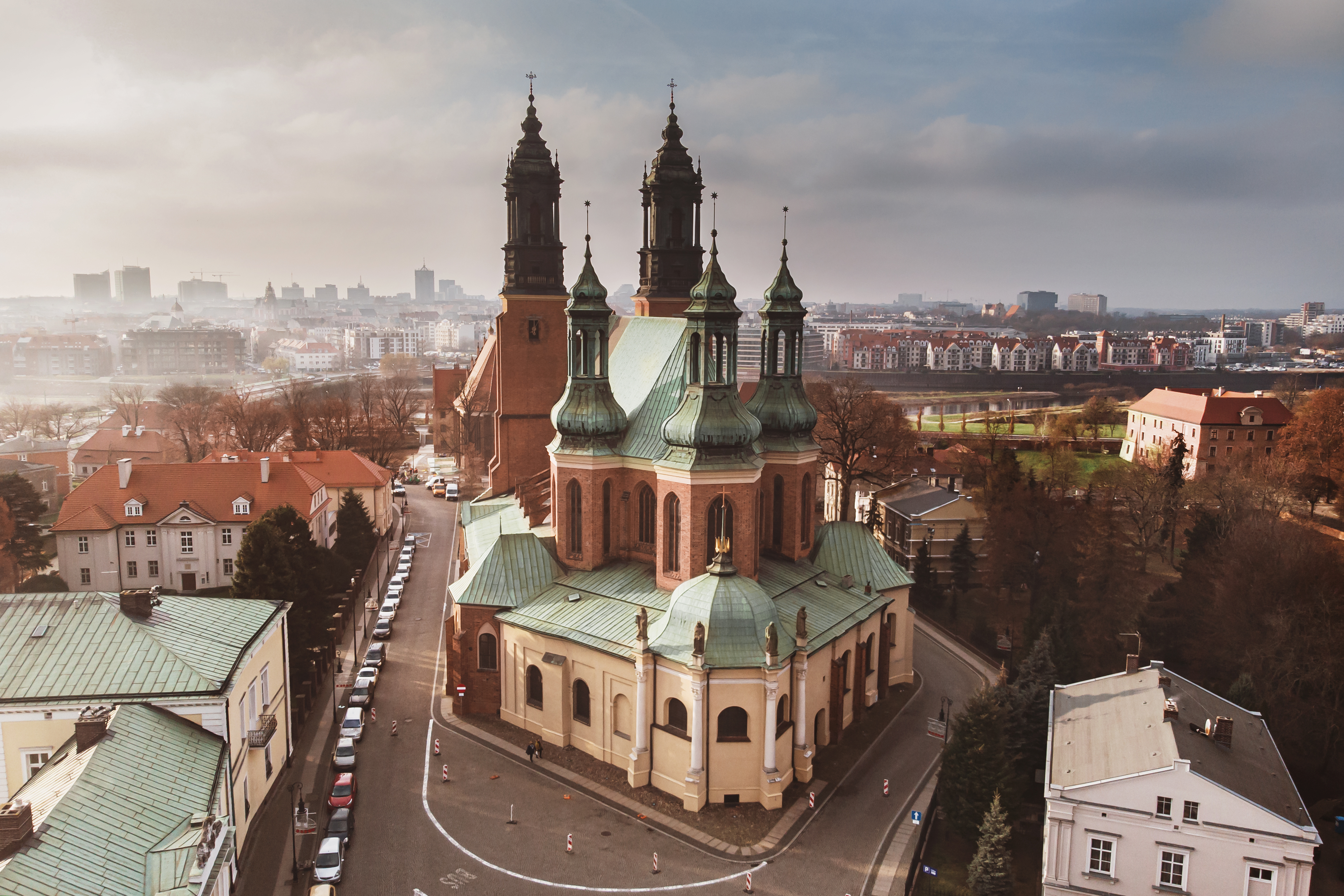
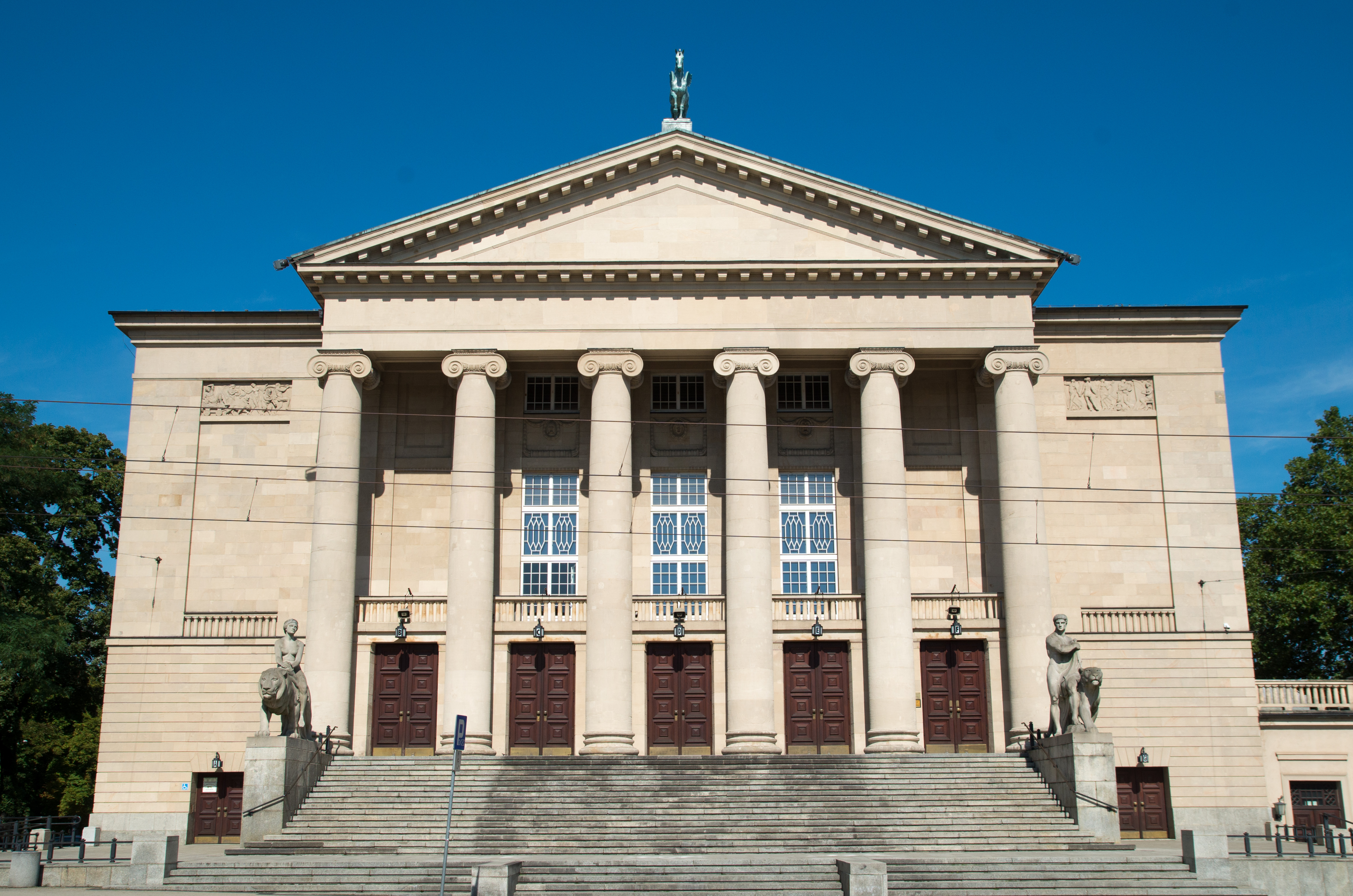
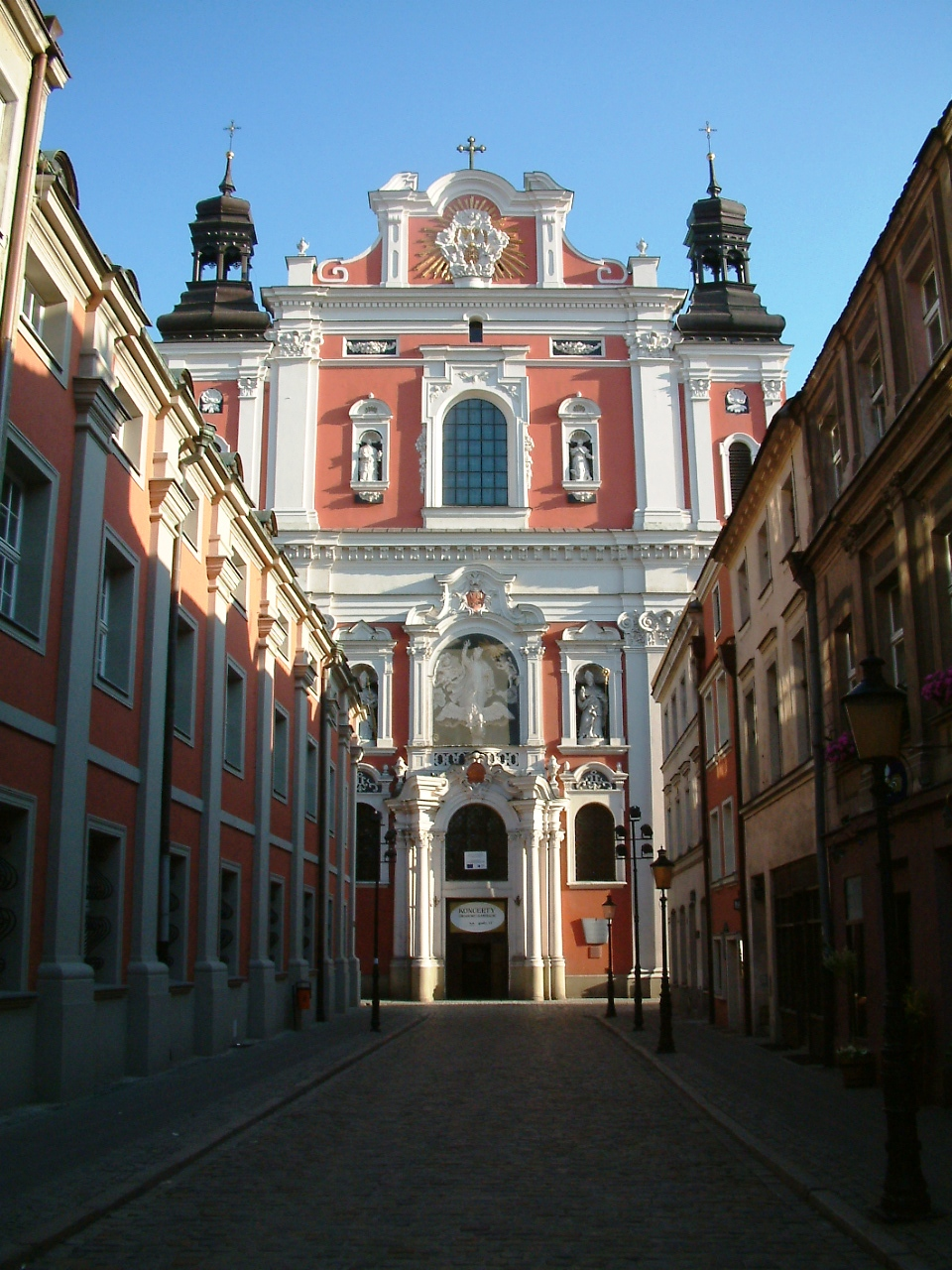
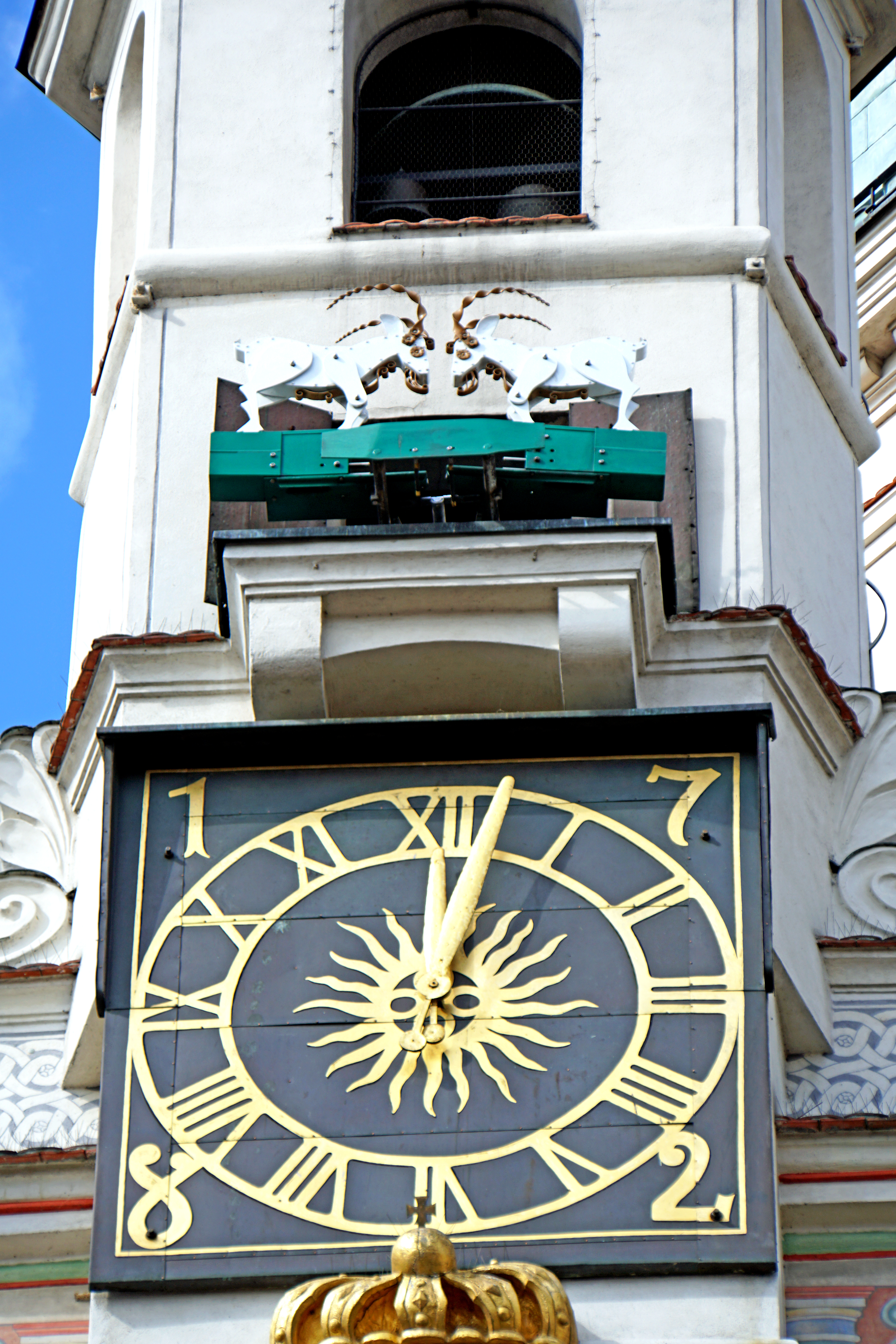
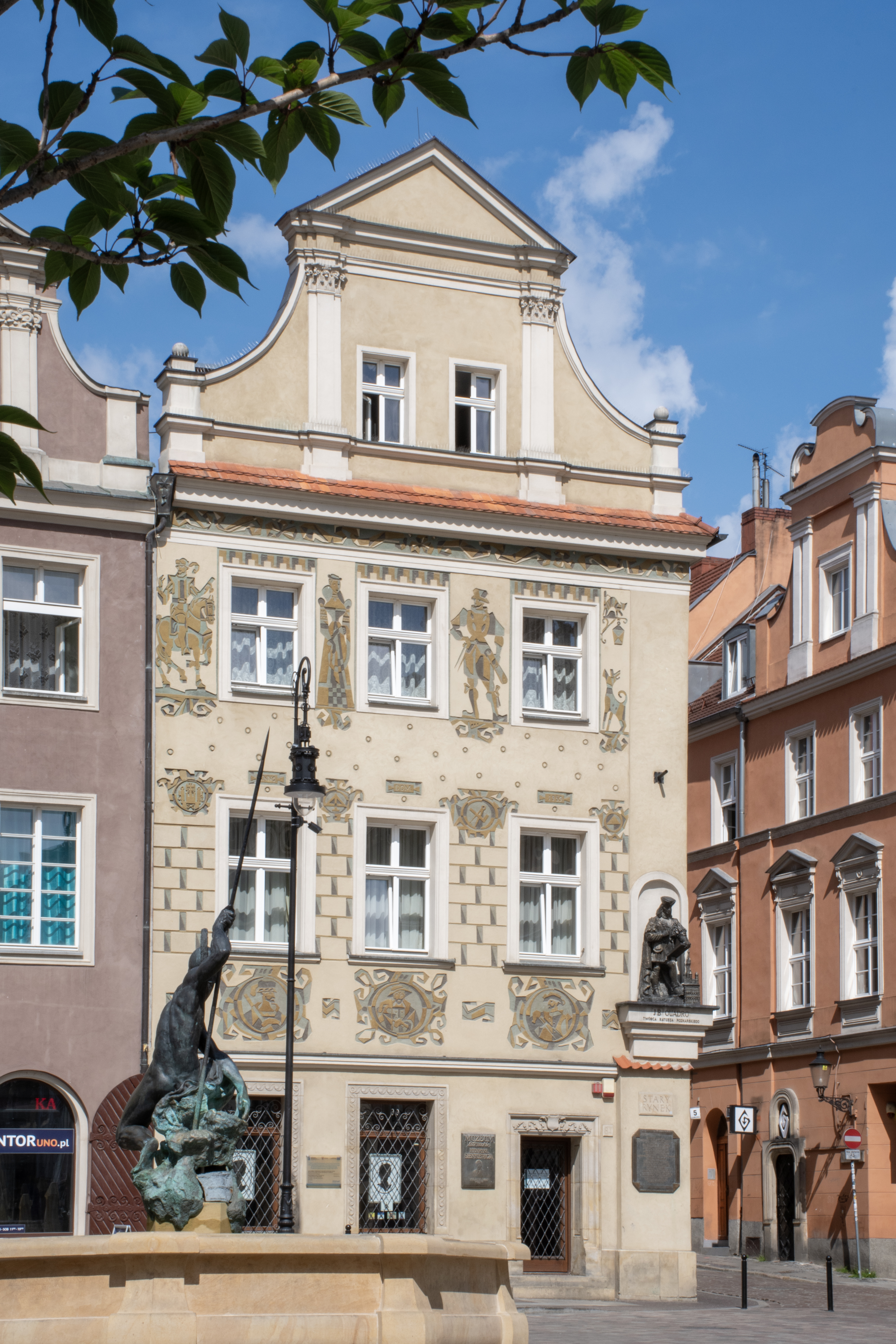
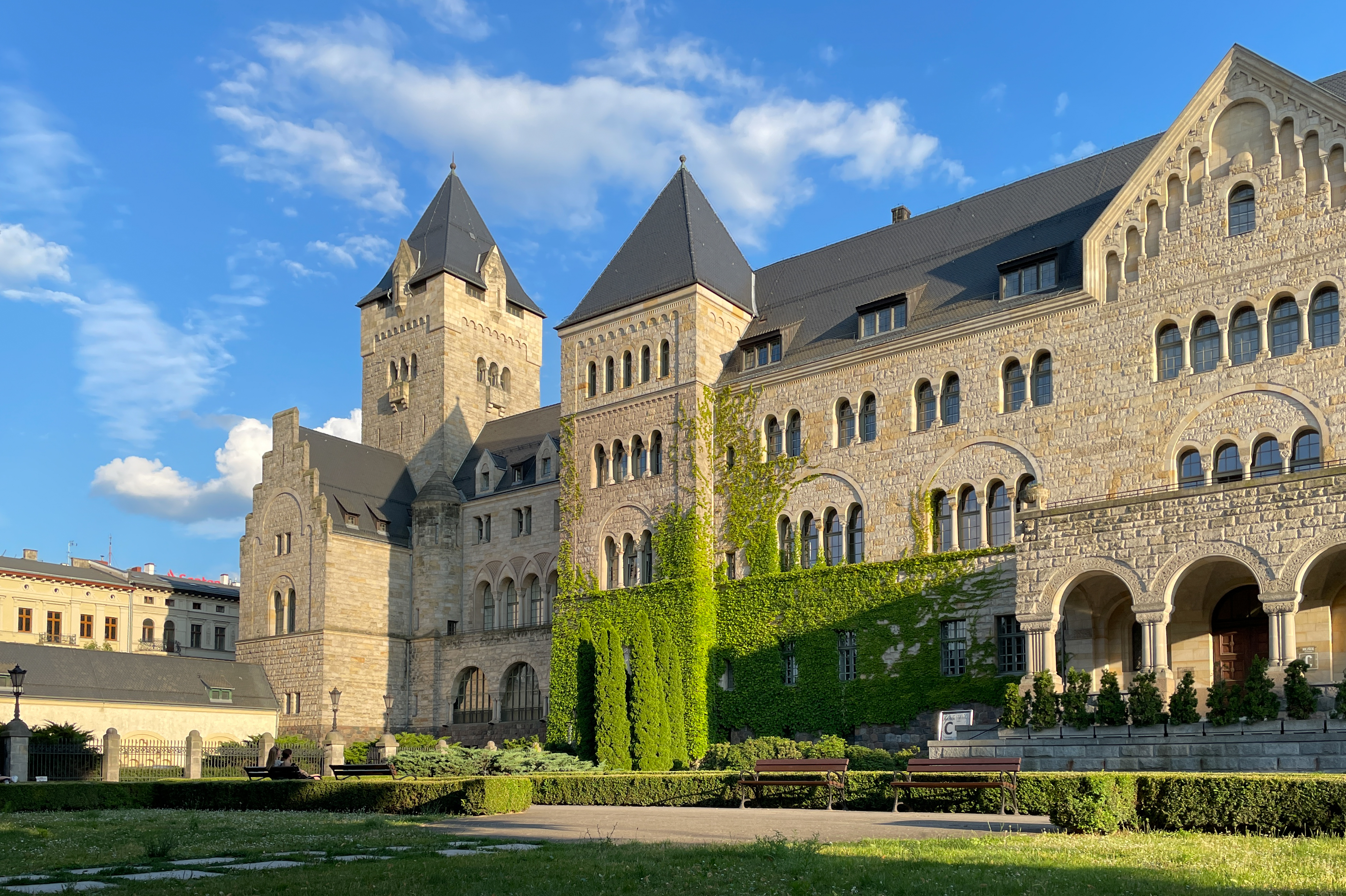
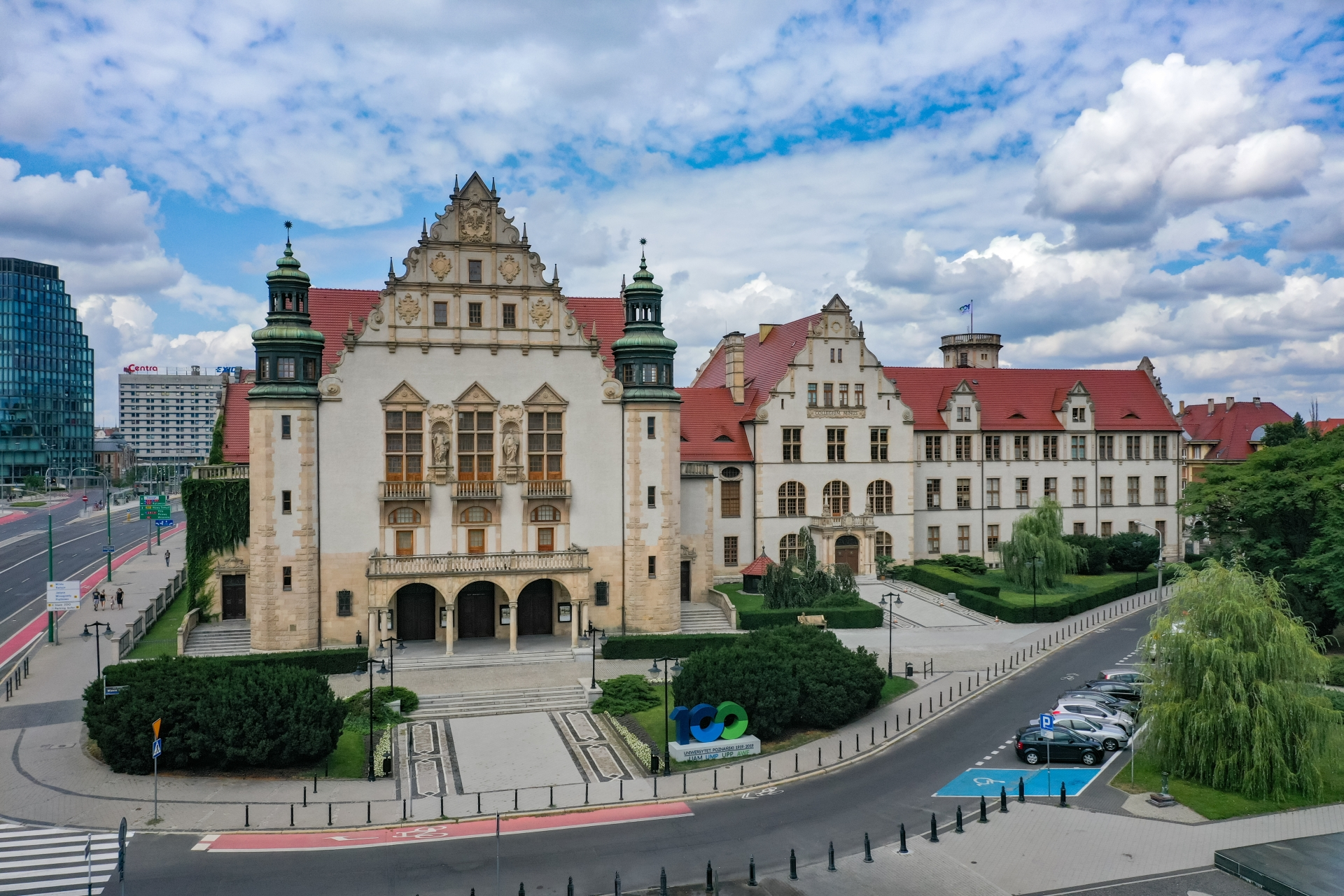
- Old Town, with the Town Hall Poznań Cathedral Grand Theatre Fara Church Goats Rynek Imperial Castle Mickiewicz University

- Flag Coat of arms Logo

- Location within Poland
- Coordinates: 52°24′30″N 16°56′01″E
- Country: Poland
- Voivodeship: Greater Poland
- County: City county
- Established: 10th century
- City rights: 1253
- City Hall: Poznań Town Hall
- Districts: 42 divisions

Government
  - Body: Poznań City Council
  - City mayor: Jacek Jaśkowiak (KO)
  - Sejm of Poland: Poznań

Area
  - City county: 261.91 km^{2} (101.12 sq mi)
  - Metro: 2,162 km^{2} (835 sq mi)
- Highest elevation: 154 m (505 ft)
- Lowest elevation: 60 m (200 ft)

Population (31 December 2025)
  - City county: 534,239 (5th)
  - Density: 2,040/km^{2} (5,300/sq mi)
  - Metro: 1,029,021
- Demonym(s): poznanianin (male) poznanianka (female) (pl)

GDP
  - City county: €21.647 billion (2023)
  - Metro: €28.603 billion (2021)
- Time zone: UTC+1 (CET)
  - Summer (DST): UTC+2 (CEST)
- Postal code: 60-001 to 61–890
- Area code: +48 61
- Vehicle registration: PO, PY
- Website: www.poznan.pl

Historic Monument of Poland
- Official name: Poznań – historic city center
- Designated: 28 November 2008
- Reference no.: Dz. U., 2008, vol. 219, No. 1401

Poznań (Polish: [ˈpɔznaj̃] or [ˈpɔznaɲ]; (Note: British English: /ˈpɒznæn/ POZ-nan, American English: /ˈpoʊznæn, ˈpoʊznɑːn/ POHZ-nan, POHZ-nahn;) German: Posen [ˈpoːzn̩]; Latin: Posnania) is a city on the River Warta in west Poland, within the Greater Poland region. The city is an important cultural and business center with customs such as Saint John's Fair (Jarmark Świętojański), traditional Saint Martin's croissants, and a local dialect. Among its most important heritage sites are the Renaissance Old Town, Town Hall and Poznań Cathedral.

Poznań is the fifth-largest city in Poland. As of 2023, the city's population is 540,146, while the Poznań metropolitan area (Metropolia Poznań) comprising Poznań County and several other communities is inhabited by over 1.029 million people. It is one of four historical capitals of medieval Poland and the ancient capital of the Greater Poland region, currently the administrative capital of the province called Greater Poland Voivodeship.

Poznań is a center of trade, sports, education, technology and tourism. It is an important academic site, with about 130,000 students and Adam Mickiewicz University, the third largest Polish university. The city serves as the seat of the oldest Polish diocese, now being one of the most populous Catholic archdioceses in the country. The city also hosts the Poznań International Fair, the biggest industrial fair in Poland and one of the largest in Europe. The city's other renowned landmarks include the National Museum, Grand Theatre, Fara Church and the Imperial Castle.

Poznań is classified as a Gamma− global city by the Globalization and World Cities Research Network. According to several rankings it is one of the most business-friendly cities in Poland. It also ranks highly in safety and healthcare quality. In 2012, Poznań's Art and Business Centre "Stary Browar" won a competition organised by National Geographic Traveler and was given the first prize as one of the seven "New Polish Wonders". Companies headquartered in the city include energy provider Enea, e-commerce company Allegro and convenience store chain Żabka.

The official patron saints of Poznań are Saint Peter and Paul of Tarsus, the patrons of the cathedral. Martin of Tours – the patron of the main street Święty Marcin – is also regarded as one of the patron saints of the city.

== Names ==
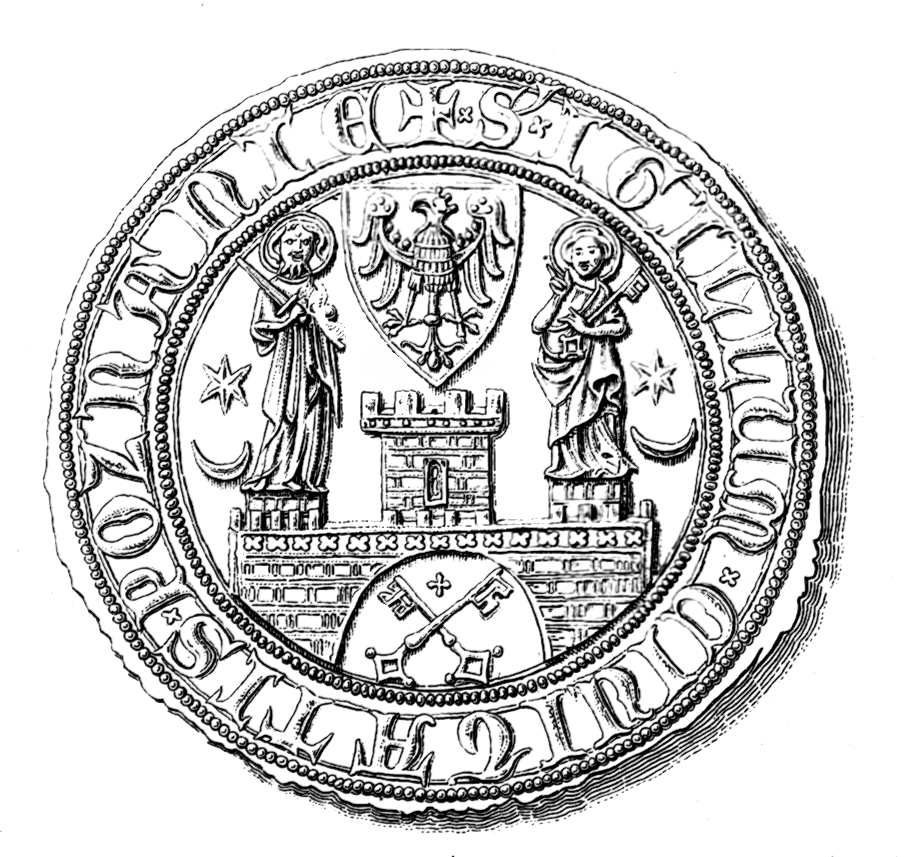
14th-century seal showing Poznań's coat of arms.

The name Poznań likely derives from the Polish verb poznać, meaning "to meet" or "to know," designating the area as a meeting place. The earliest known references to Poznań are found in the chronicles of Thietmar of Merseburg: episcopus Posnaniensis ("bishop of Poznań", in 970) and ab urbe Posnani ("from the city of Poznań", in 1005). The city's name is documented in the Latin nominative case as Posnania in 1236, and as Poznania in 1247. The phrase in Poznan appears in 1146 and 1244.

The city's full official name is Stołeczne Miasto Poznań (The Capital City of Poznań), owing to its role as a centre of political power in the early Polish state under the Piast dynasty. In German, Poznań is known as Posen; it was officially named Haupt- und Residenzstadt Posen (Capital and Residence City of Posen) between 20 August 1910 and 28 November 1918. Among the Latin names used in historical records are Posnania and Civitas Posnaniensis. Its Yiddish name is פּױזן (Poyzn).

== History ==
=== Early Middle Ages ===
For centuries before the Christianization of Poland (an event that essentially is credited as the creation of the very first Polish state, the Duchy of Poland), Poznań was an important cultural and political centre of the Western Polans. It consisted of a fortified stronghold between the Warta and Cybina rivers on what is now Ostrów Tumski. Mieszko I, the first historically recorded ruler of the West Polans and of the early Polish state which they dominated, built one of his main gords in Poznań. Mieszko's baptism in AD 966, seen as a defining moment in the Christianization of the Polish state, may have taken place in Poznań.

=== 11th to 16th centuries ===
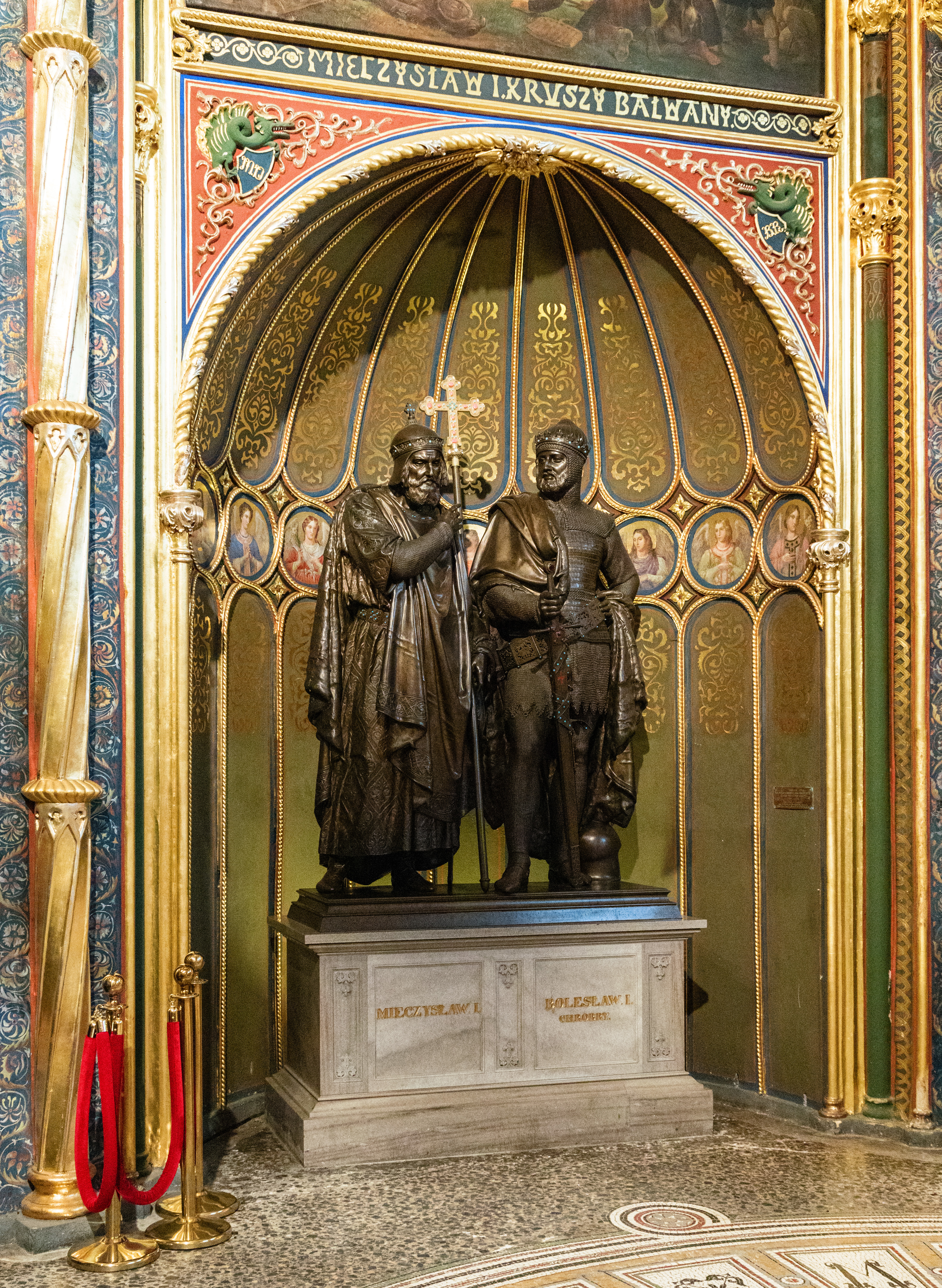
Monument of Mieszko I and Bolesław I the Brave in Golden Chapel at Archcathedral Basilica.

Following the baptism, construction began of Poznań's cathedral, the first in Poland. Poznań was the main seat of the first missionary bishop sent to Poland, Bishop Jordan. The Congress of Gniezno in 1000 led to the country's first permanent archbishopric being established in Gniezno (which is generally regarded as Poland's capital in that period), although Poznań continued to have independent bishops of its own. Poznań's cathedral was the place of burial of the early Piast monarchs, among them Mieszko I, Bolesław I the Brave, Mieszko II Lambert, Casimir I, and later of Przemysł I and Przemysł II.

The pagan reaction that followed Mieszko II's death (probably in Poznań) in 1034 left the region weak, and in 1038, Duke Bretislaus I of Bohemia sacked and destroyed both Poznań and Gniezno. Poland was reunited under Casimir I the Restorer in 1039, but the capital was moved to Kraków, which had been relatively unaffected by the troubles. In 1138, by the testament of Boleslaus III, Poland was divided into separate duchies under the late king's sons, and Poznań and its surroundings became the domain of Mieszko III the Old, the first of the Dukes of Greater Poland. This period of fragmentation lasted until 1320. Duchies frequently changed hands; control of Poznań, Gniezno and Kalisz sometimes lay with a single duke, but at other times these constituted separate duchies.

In about 1249, Duke Przemysł I began constructing what would become the Royal Castle on a hill on the left bank of the Warta. Then in 1253, Przemysł issued a charter to Thomas of Gubin for the founding of a town under Magdeburg law, between the castle and the river. Thomas brought a large number of German settlers to aid in the building and settlement of the city – this is an example of the German eastern migration (Ostsiedlung) characteristic of that period. The city, which covered the area of today's Old Town neighbourhood, was surrounded by a defensive wall, integrated with the castle. The royal chancery and the university ensured a first flourishing of Polish literary culture in the city.

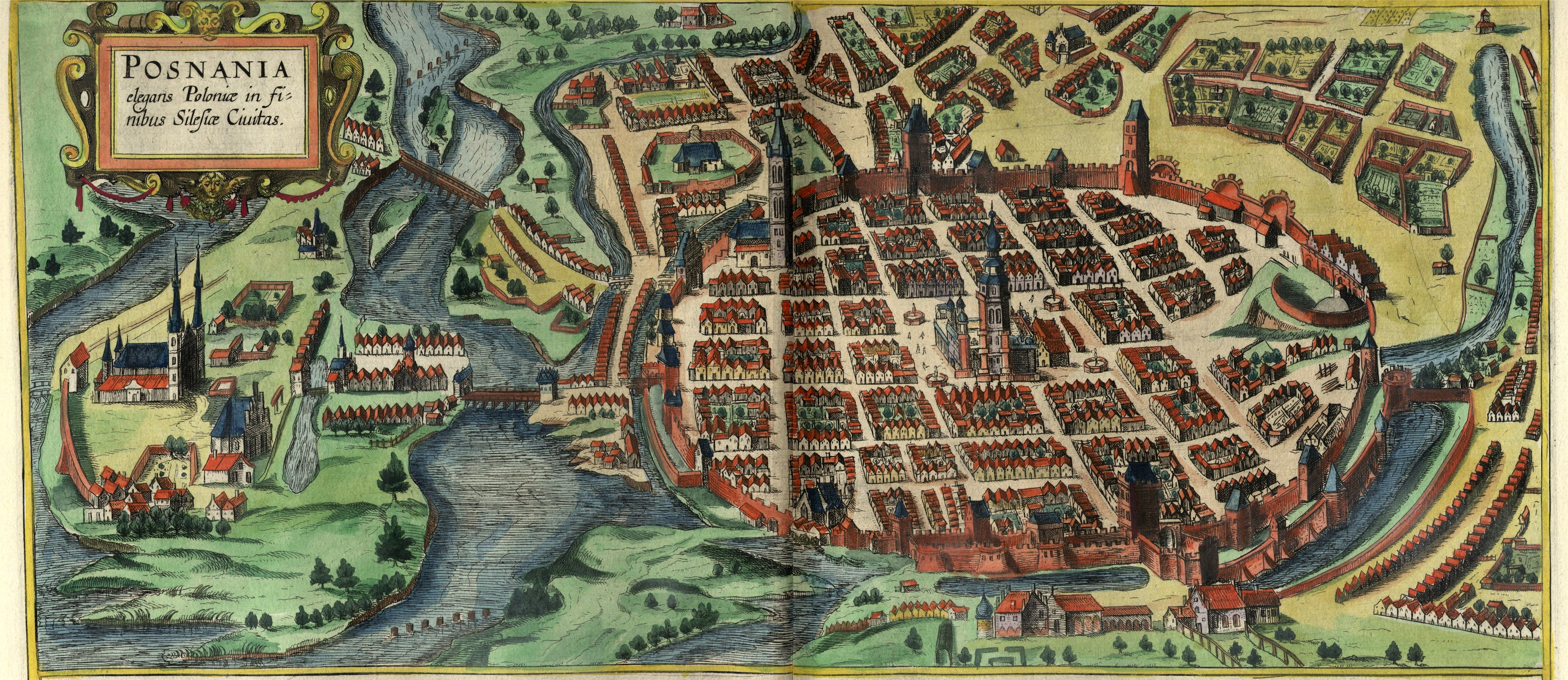
Poznań (Posnania), c. 1617, view from the north.

In reunited Poland, and later in the Polish–Lithuanian Commonwealth, Poznań was the seat of a voivodeship. The city's importance began to grow in the Jagiellonian period, due to its position on trading routes from Lithuania and Ruthenia to western Europe. It would become a major centre for the fur trade by the late 16th century. Suburban settlements developed around the city walls, on the river islands, and on the right bank, with some (Ostrów Tumski, Śródka, Chwaliszewo, Ostrówek) obtaining their own town charters. However, the city's development was hampered by regular major fires and floods. On 2 May 1536 a fire destroyed 175 buildings, including the castle, the town hall, the monastery, and the suburban settlement called St. Martin. In 1519, the Lubrański Academy had been established in Poznań as an institution of higher education, but without the right to award degrees, which was reserved to Kraków's Jagiellonian University. However, the Jesuits' college, founded in the city in 1571 during the Counter-Reformation, had the right to award degrees from 1611 until 1773, when it was combined with the academy.

=== 17th and 18th centuries ===
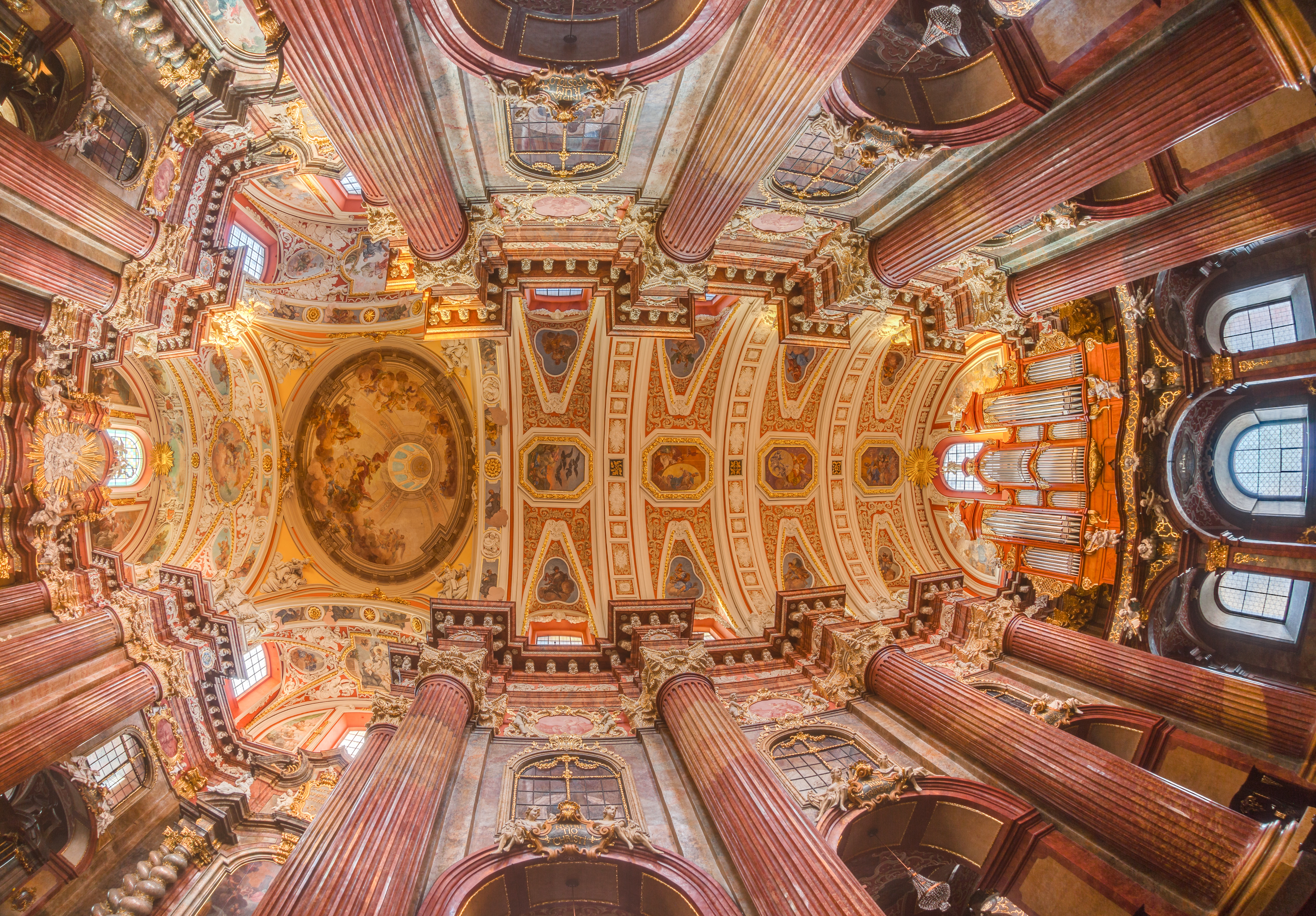
Interior details in Collegiate Basilica known as Fara built in 1651–1705; one of the finest examples of baroque architecture in Poland.

In the second half of the 17th century and most of the 18th, Poznań was severely affected by a series of wars, attendant military occupations, lootings and destruction – the Second and Third Northern Wars, the War of the Polish Succession, the Seven Years' War and the Bar Confederation. During the Deluge, Poznań's Jewish community was accused of collaborating with the invading Swedish enemy, and as a result suffered pogroms carried out by both the city's non-Jewish residents and units of the Polish Crown Army.

It was also hit by frequent outbreaks of plague, and by floods, particularly that of 1736, which destroyed most of the suburban buildings. The population of the conurbation declined from 20,000 around 1600 to 6,000 around 1730, and Bambergian and Dutch settlers (Bambers and Olęders) were brought in to rebuild the devastated suburbs. In 1778, a "Committee of Good Order" (Komisja Dobrego Porządku) was established in the city, which oversaw rebuilding efforts and reorganized the city's administration. However, in 1793, in the Second Partition of Poland, Poznań came under the control of the Kingdom of Prussia, becoming part of (and initially the seat of) the province of South Prussia.

=== 19th century to World War I ===
The Prussian authorities expanded the city boundaries, making the walled city and its closest suburbs into a single administrative unit. Left-bank suburbs were incorporated in 1797, and Ostrów Tumski, Chwaliszewo, Śródka, Ostrówek and Łacina (St. Roch) in 1800. The old city walls were taken down in the early 19th century, and major development took place to the west of the old city, with many of the main streets of today's city centre being laid out.

In the Greater Poland uprising of 1806, Polish soldiers and civilian volunteers assisted the efforts of Napoleon by driving out Prussian forces from the region. The city became a part of the Duchy of Warsaw in 1807, and was the seat of Poznań Department – a unit of administrative division and local government. However, in 1815, following the Congress of Vienna, the region was returned to Prussia, and Poznań became the capital of the semi-autonomous Grand Duchy of Posen. Around 1820, Poznań had over 20,000 inhabitants, 70% of whom were Poles, 20% Jews, and 10% Germans.

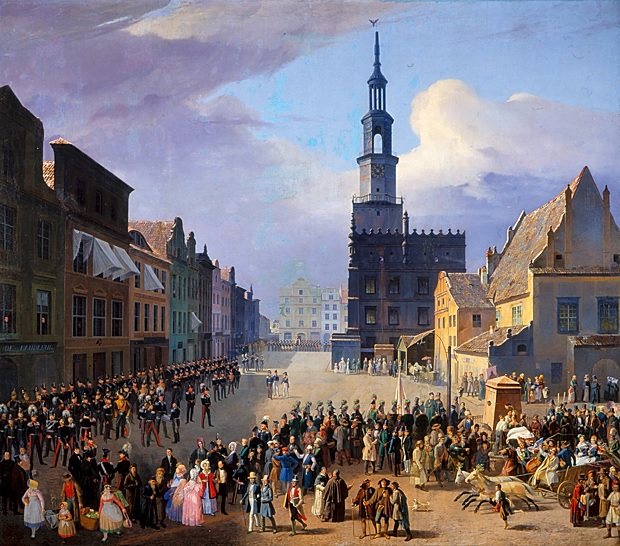
Poznań in the mid-19th century

The city continued to expand, and various projects were funded by Polish philanthropists, such as the Raczyński Library and the Bazar hotel. The city's first railway, running north-west to Stargard, opened in 1848. Due to its strategic location, the Prussian authorities intended to make Poznań into a fortress city, building a ring of defensive fortifications around it. Work began on the citadel with Fort Winiary in 1828, and in subsequent years the entire set of defences called Festung Posen was completed.

A Greater Poland Uprising during the Revolutions of 1848 was ultimately unsuccessful, and the Grand Duchy lost its remaining autonomy, Poznań becoming simply the capital of the Prussian Province of Posen. It would become part of the German Empire with the unification of German states in 1871. Polish patriots continued to form societies such as the Central Economic Society for the Grand Duchy of Poznań, and Polish Theatre opened in 1875. It became a national stage for the inhabitants of the province of Posen, and even in whole Greater Poland region, acting as a mainstay of Polish tradition and culture, and as a sign of resistance against the restrictive policies of the Prussian partition authorities. However, the authorities made efforts to Germanize the region, particularly through the Prussian Settlement Commission founded in 1886. Germans accounted for 38% of the city's population in 1867, though this percentage would later decline somewhat, particularly after the region returned to Poland.

Another expansion of Festung Posen was planned, with an outer ring of more widely spaced forts around the perimeter of the city. Building of the first nine forts began in 1876, and nine intermediate forts were built from 1887. The inner ring of fortifications was now considered obsolete and came to be mostly taken down by the early 20th century, although the citadel remained in use. This made space for further civilian construction, particularly the Prussian Royal Residence Palace (Zamek) which was completed in 1910, and other grand buildings around it, including today's central university buildings and the opera house. The city's boundaries were also significantly extended to take in former suburban villages: Piotrowo and Berdychowo in 1896, Łazarz, Górczyn, Jeżyce and Wilda in 1900, and Sołacz in 1907.

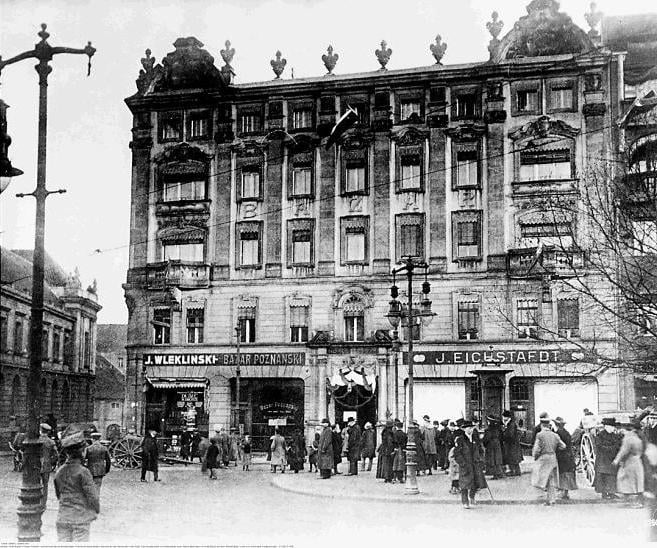
Successful Greater Poland uprising broke out on 27 December 1918 after a patriotic speech by Ignacy Paderewski at Hotel Bazar, pictured in that period.

In 1910, Poznań had 156,696 inhabitants, of which nearly 60% were Poles (over 91,000 Polish inhabitants of the city), and around 40% were Germans (over 65,000 German inhabitants of the city). Other nationalities accounted for 1–2% of the population (mainly Jews). Germans tended to settle in the newer western part of the city, the Kaiserviertel or Kaiser district, Poles in the older east side. And while there was tension between the two major populations there was also some overlap between them, particularly in cultural events.

The percentage of Polish-speakers declined from 76.6% in 1846 to 69.9% in 1858 and just 50.4% in 1890, but then rebounded to 57.9% in 1910. According to censuses of elementary school pupils the share of Polish-speakers among pupils was higher: 63.7% in 1886 and 78.7% in 1911.

After independence the percentage of Polish-speakers was 92.8% in 1921 and 96.6% in 1931.

=== Interbellum ===
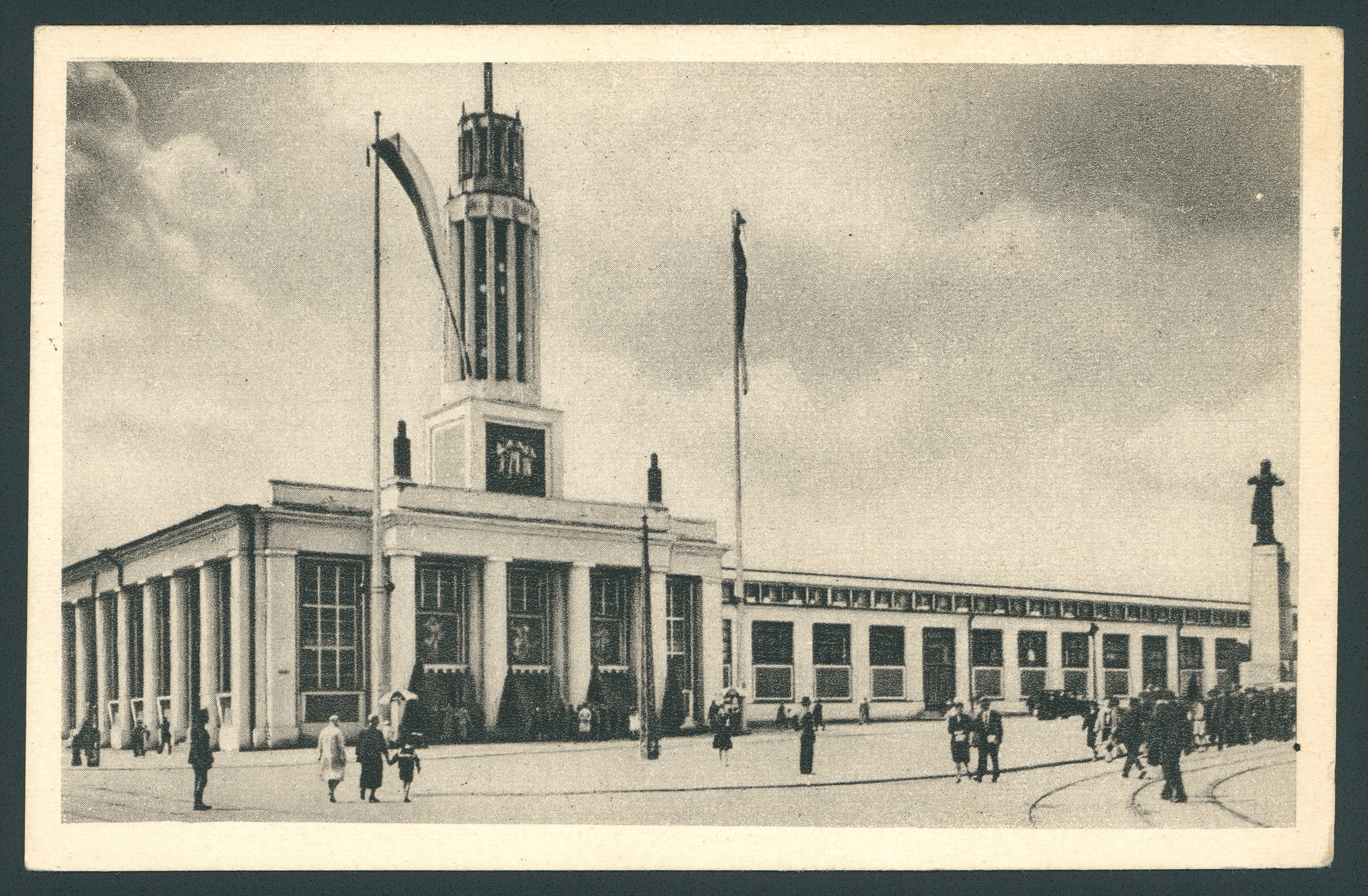
Polish General Exhibition building at the Poznań International Fair, 1929

At the end of World War I, the Treaty of Versailles awarded the province and city of Posen to the new Poland. The local German populace were forced to acquire Polish citizenship or leave the country, forfeiting all property to the Polish State. This led to a wide emigration of the ethnic Germans of the town's population – the town's German population decreased from 65,321 in 1910 to 5,980 by 1926 and further to 4,387 in 1934.

In the interwar Second Polish Republic, the city again became the capital of Poznań Voivodeship. Poznań's university, today called Adam Mickiewicz University, was founded in 1919, and in 1924 the Poznań International Fair began. In 1929, the fair site was the venue for a major National Exhibition (Powszechna Wystawa Krajowa, popularly PeWuKa) marking the tenth anniversary of independence; organized on a space of 650,000 square metres it attracted around 4.5 million visitors. In the 1930s, the fair ranked as European fourth largest organiser of international trade events. Staging of the Exhibition coincided with the advent of the economic crisis. Preparations for the Exhibition required an enormous amount of work, and considerable investments were needed to build a suitable infrastructure. Poznań became a large building site, with many labourers coming to the city in search of employment. After 1929 those labourers added to the large group of the unemployed in the aftermath of the great economic crisis. The city's boundaries were again expanded in 1925 to include Główna, Komandoria, Rataje, Starołęka, Dębiec, Szeląg and Winogrady, and in 1933: Golęcin and Podolany.

=== World War II ===
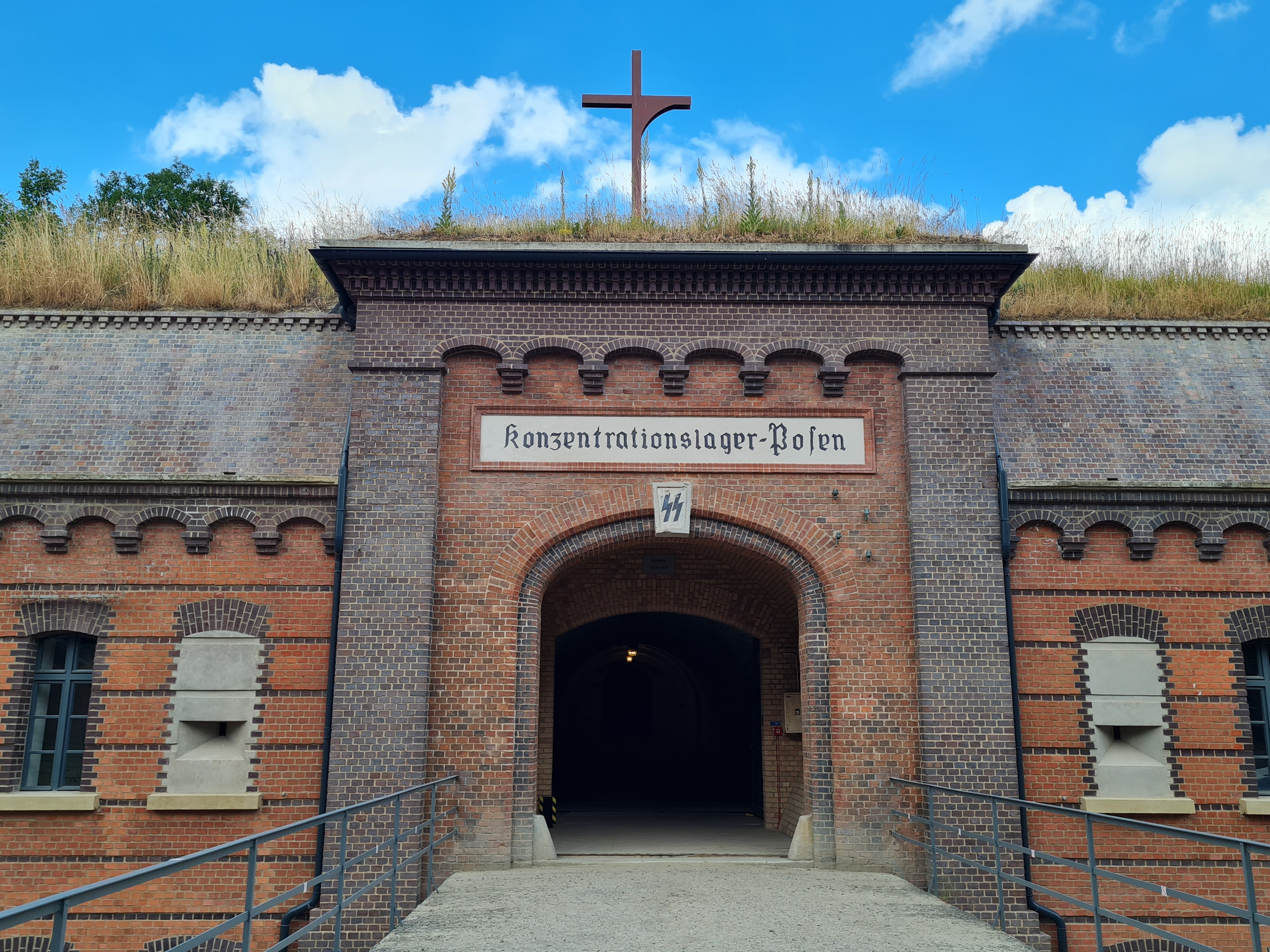
Entrance to the German Nazi concentration camp, Konzentrationslager Posen, at Fort VII.

During the German occupation of 1939–1945, Poznań was incorporated into Nazi Germany as the capital of the Reichsgau Wartheland. Many Polish inhabitants, even children as young as ten, were executed, arrested, expelled to the General Government or used as forced labour. Polish children were also kidnapped and deported to an infamous camp for Polish children in Łódź. At the same time, many Germans and Volksdeutsche were settled in the city. The German population increased from around 5,000 in 1939 (about 2% of the inhabitants) to around 95,000 in 1944.

The Jewish community's history in the city dates back to the 13th century. In earlier centuries, the Jewish council of Poznań became one of the most important in Poland. On the eve of World War II, there were at least about 2,000 Jews in the city. Most were murdered in the Holocaust, primarily in the Chełmno extermination camp and other sites of mass execution.

A German Nazi concentration camp was established in Fort VII, one of the 19th-century perimeter forts. The camp was later moved to Żabikowo south of Poznań. The Stalag XXI-D German prisoner-of-war camp for Allied POWs of various nationalities also operated in the city.

The Polish resistance was active in Poznań, with various organizations operating in secrecy. An underground Polish parliament was also established in the city.

The German occupation authorities significantly expanded Poznań's boundaries to include most of the present day area of the city (these borders were retained after the war). Poznań was captured by the Red Army during the Battle of Poznań on 23 February 1945. The city had been designated a Festung. The Citadel was the last point to succumb to the assault. The fighting left much of Poznań in ruins, especially the Old Town that was severely damaged. Many monuments, including the statue of Woodrow Wilson by Gutzon Borglum were destroyed and removed.

=== 1945–present ===
Due to the expulsion and flight of the German population, Poznań's post-war population became almost uniformly Polish. The city again became a voivodeship capital. In 1950, the size of Poznań Voivodeship was reduced, and the city itself was given separate voivodeship status. This status was lost in the 1975 reforms, which also significantly reduced the size of Poznań Voivodeship.

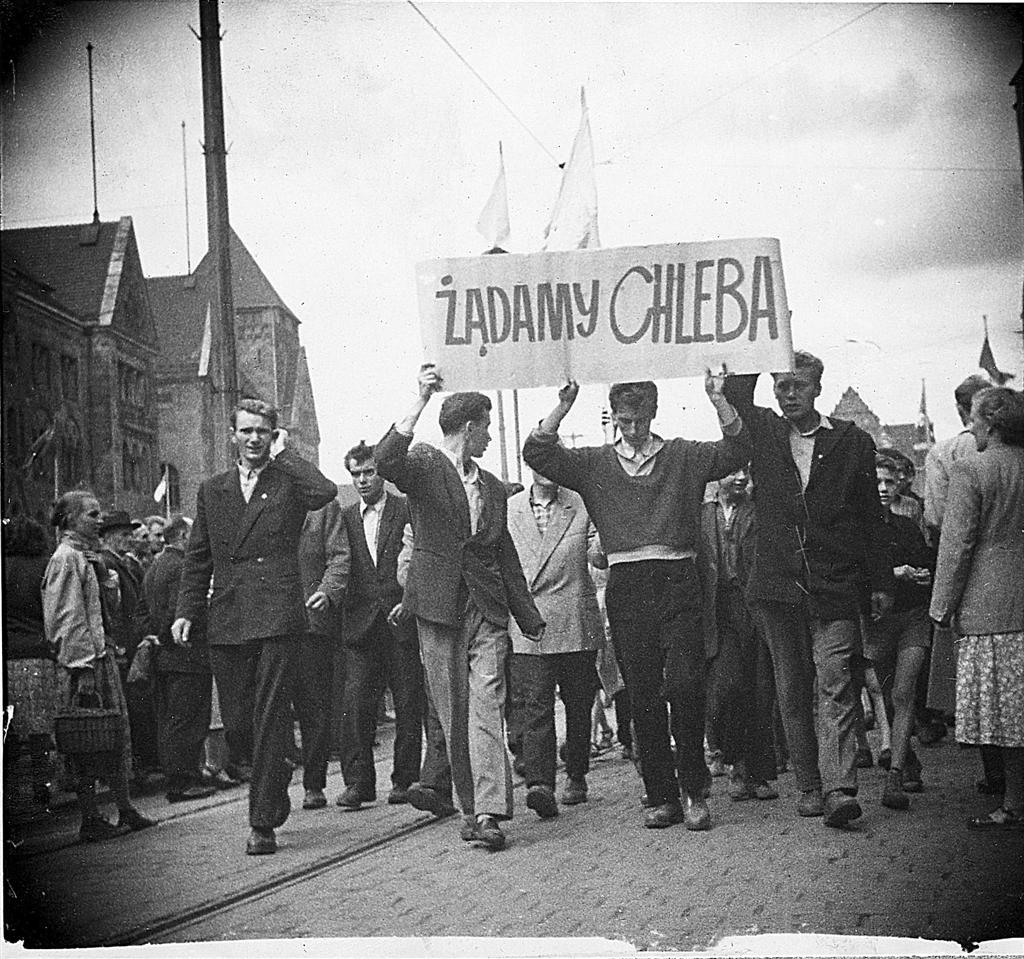
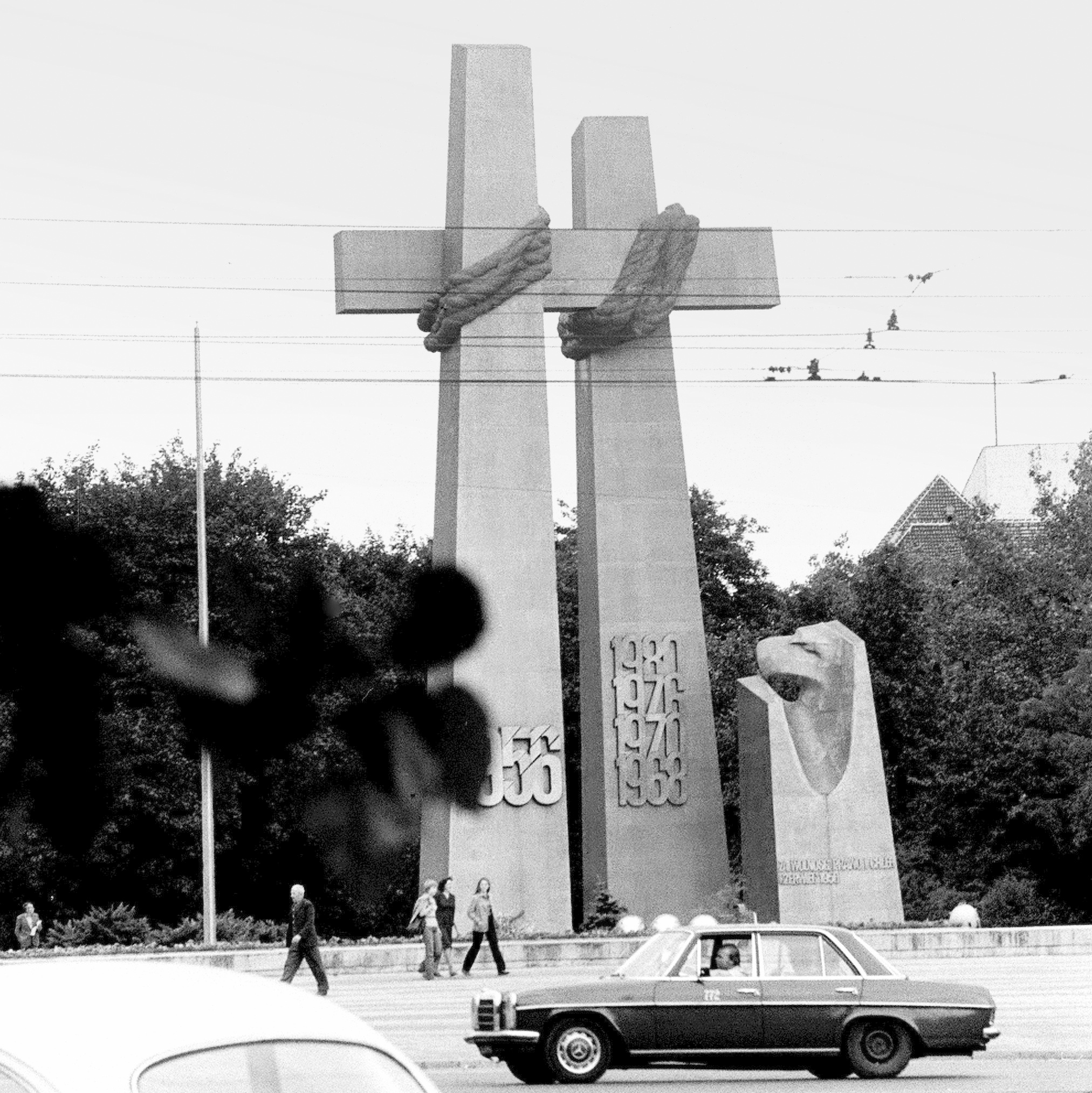
From left: Poznań protests of 1956 – the first of several massive protests against the communist government – the sign reads "We demand bread!"; Poznań Crosses – Monument to the Victims of June 1956 (built and pictured in 1981).

The Poznań 1956 protests are seen as an early instance of discontent with communist rule. In June 1956, a protest by workers at the city's Cegielski locomotive factory developed into a series of strikes and popular protests against the policies of the government. After a protest march on 28 June was fired on, crowds attacked the communist party and secret police headquarters, where they were repulsed by gunfire. Riots continued for two days until being quelled by the army; 67 people were killed according to official figures. A monument to the victims was erected in 1981 at Plac Mickiewicza.

The post-war years saw much reconstruction work on buildings damaged in the fighting. From the 1960s onwards intensive housing development took place, consisting mainly of pre-fabricated concrete blocks of flats, especially in Rataje and Winogrady, and later Piątkowo, following its incorporation into the city in 1974. Another infrastructural change, which was completed in 1968, was the rerouting of the river Warta to follow two straight branches either side of Ostrów Tumski.

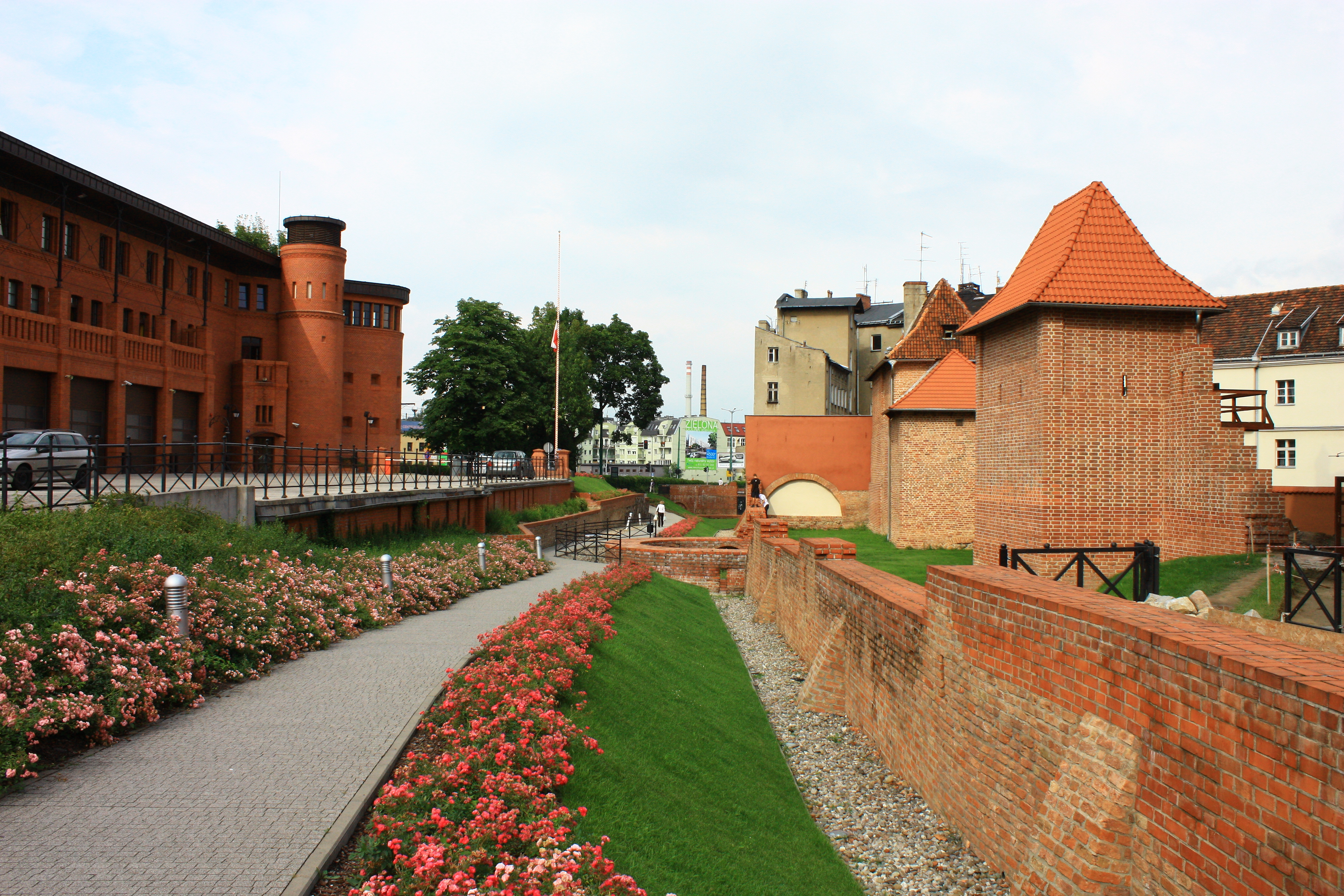
On the right remnants of the medieval town walls with two small towers.

The most recent expansion of the city's boundaries took place in 1987, with the addition of new areas mainly to the north, including Morasko, Radojewo and Kiekrz. The first free local elections following the fall of communism took place in 1990. With the Polish local government reforms of 1999, Poznań again became the capital of a larger province entitled Greater Poland Voivodeship. It also became the seat of a powiat Poznań County, with the city itself gaining separate powiat status.

Post-communist infrastructural developments include the opening of the Pestka Fast Tram route in 1997, and Poznań's first motorway connections in 2003, with Poland's east–west A2 highway running south of the city centre, serving also as a bypass. In 2006, the country's first F-16 Fighting Falcons came to be stationed at the 31st Air Base in Krzesiny in the south-east of the city.

Poznań continues to host regular trade fairs and international events, including the United Nations Climate Change Conference in 2008. It was one of the host cities for UEFA Euro 2012.

== Geography ==
=== Location and topography ===
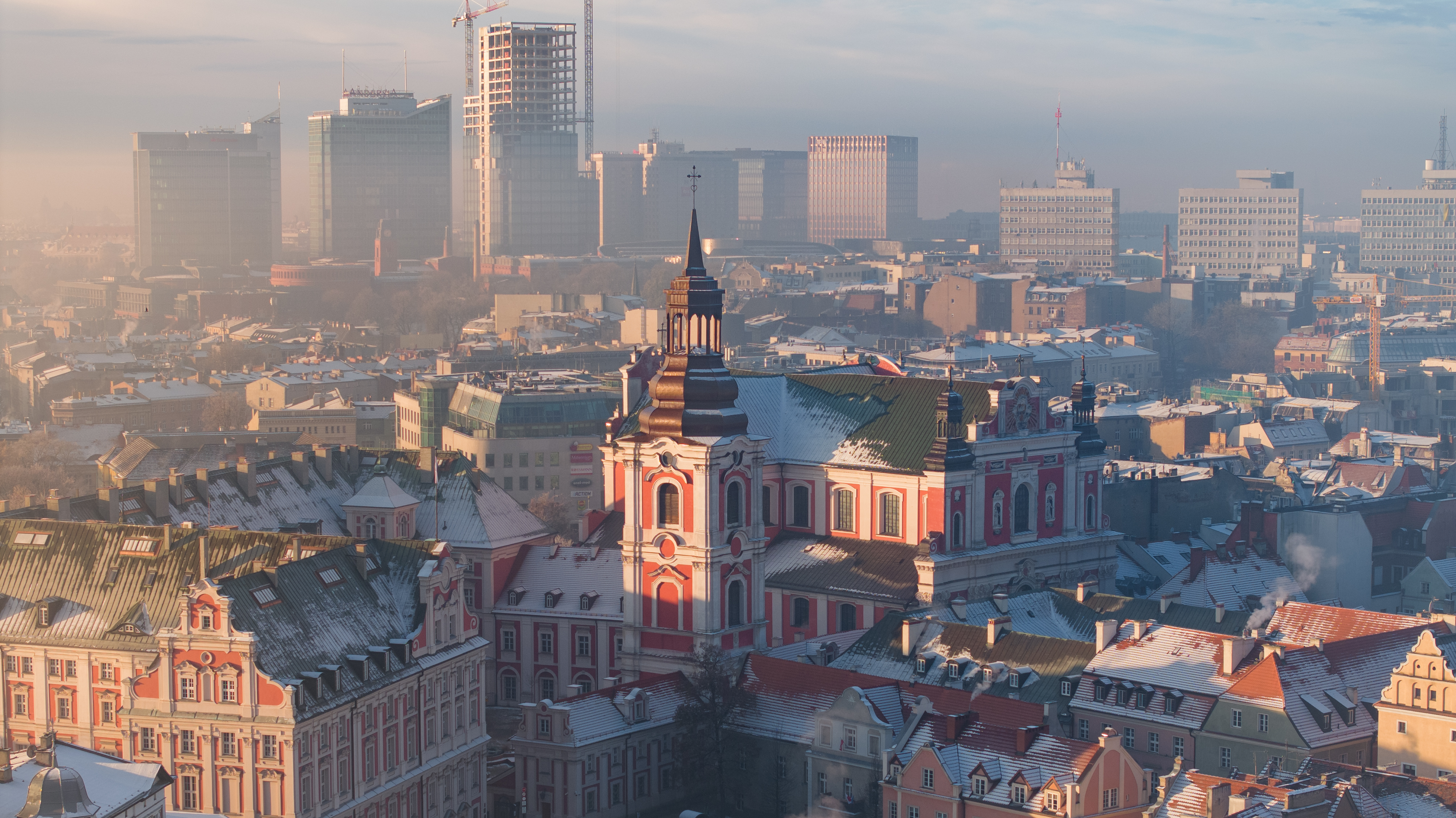
Panoramic view of Old Town in winter.

Poznań covers an area of 261.91 km^{2} (101.1 sq mi), and has coordinates in the range 52°17'34''–52°30'27''N, 16°44'08''–17°04'28''E. Its highest point, with an altitude of 157 m (515 ft), is the summit of Morasko hill within the Morasko meteorite nature reserve in the north of the city. The lowest altitude is 60 m (197 ft), in the Warta valley.

Poznań's main river is the Warta, which flows through the city from south to north. As it approaches the city centre it divides into two branches, flowing west and east of Ostrów Tumski Cathedral island, and meeting again further north. The smaller Cybina river flows through eastern Poznań to meet the east branch of the Warta, which is also called Cybina – its northern section was originally a continuation of that river, while its southern section has been artificially widened to form a main stream of the Warta. Other tributaries of the Warta within Poznań are the Junikowo Stream (Strumień Junikowski), which flows through southern Poznań from the west, meeting the Warta just outside the city boundary in Luboń; the Bogdanka and Wierzbak, formerly two separate tributaries flowing from the north-west and along the north side of the city centre, now with their lower sections diverted underground; the Główna, flowing through the neighbourhood of the same name in north-east Poznań; and the Rose Stream (Strumień Różany) flowing east from Morasko in the north of the city. The course of the Warta in central Poznań was formerly quite different from today: the main stream ran between Grobla and Chwaliszewo, which were originally both islands. The branch west of Grobla (the Zgniła Warta – "rotten Warta") was filled in during the late 19th century, while the former main stream west of Chwaliszewo was diverted and filled in during the 1960s. This was done partly to prevent floods, which did serious damage to Poznań frequently throughout history.

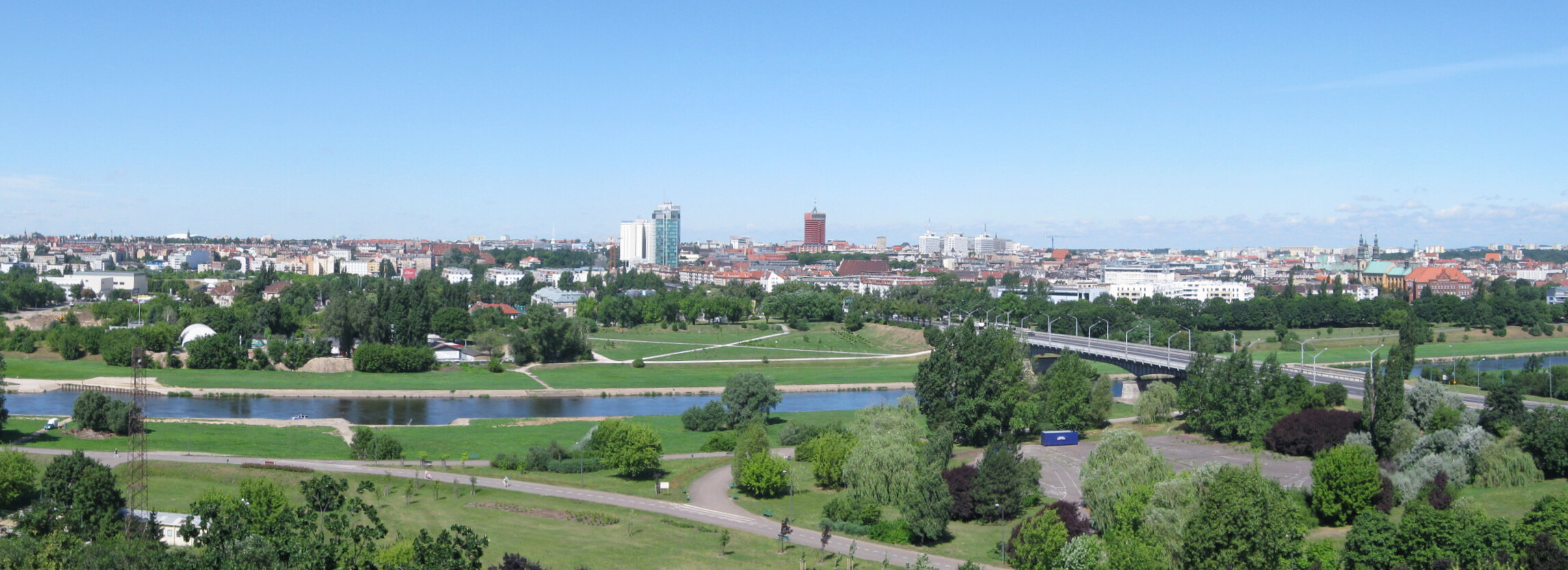
Warta River Valley in Poznań

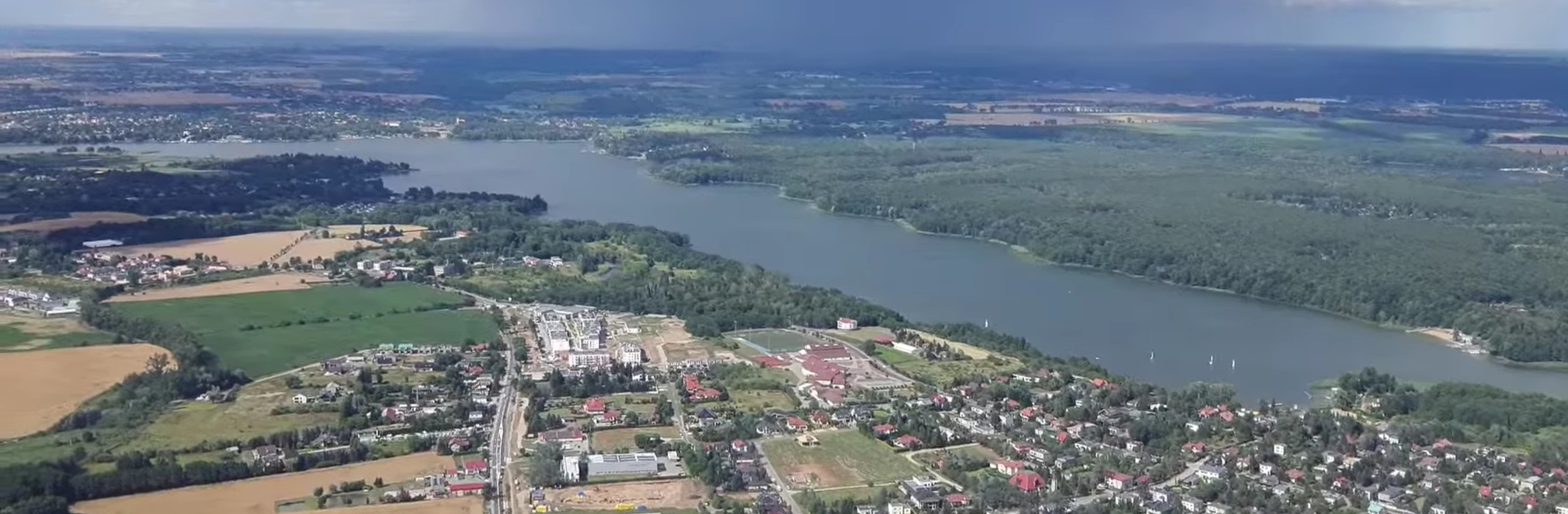
The largest of city's four major lakes, Great Kierskie Lake, is a centre of sailing and iceboating.

Poznań's largest lake is Kiekrz in the north-west end of the city. Other large lakes include Malta, an artificial lake formed in 1952 on the lower Cybina river, Strzeszyn on the Bogdanka, and Rusałka, an artificial lake formed in 1943 further down the Bogdanka river. The latter two are popular bathing places. Kiekrz lake is much used for sailing, while Malta is a competitive rowing and canoeing venue.

The city centre – including the Old Town, the former islands of Grobla and Chwaliszewo, the main street Święty Marcin and many other important buildings and districts – lies on the west side of the Warta. Opposite it between the two branches of the Warta is Ostrów Tumski, containing Cathedral and other ecclesiastical buildings, as well as housing and industrial facilities. Facing the cathedral on the east bank of the river is the historic district of Śródka. Large areas of apartment blocks, built from the 1960s onwards, include Rataje in the east, and Winogrady and Piątkowo north of the centre. Older residential and commercial districts include those of Wilda, Łazarz and Górczyn to the south, and Jeżyce to the west. There are also significant areas of forest within the city boundaries, particularly in the east adjoining Swarzędz, and around the lakes in the north-west.

For more details on Poznań's geography, see the articles on its five main districts: Stare Miasto, Nowe Miasto, Jeżyce, Grunwald, and Wilda.

Districts of Poznań

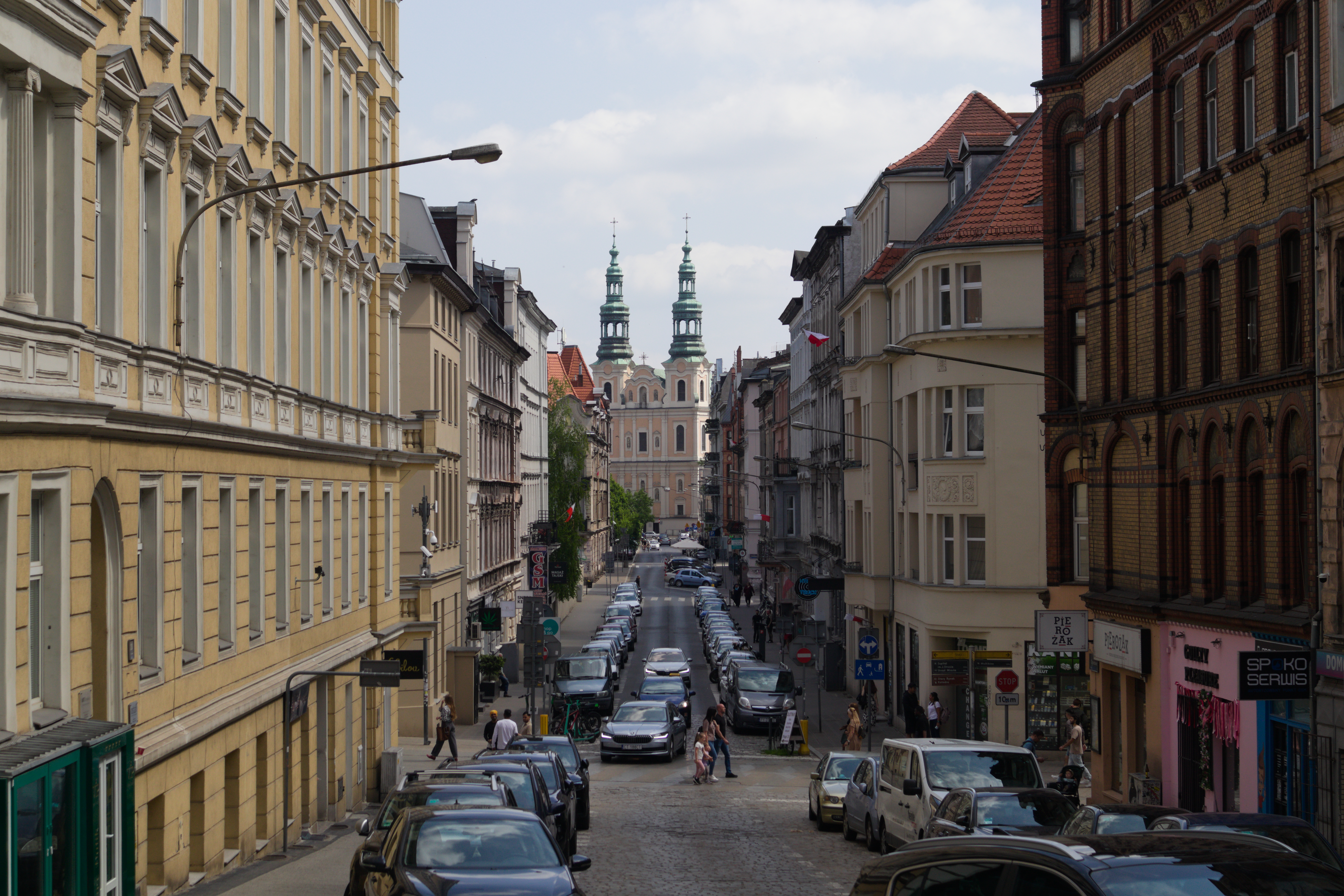
Ulica Długa (Long Street) in Stare Miasto

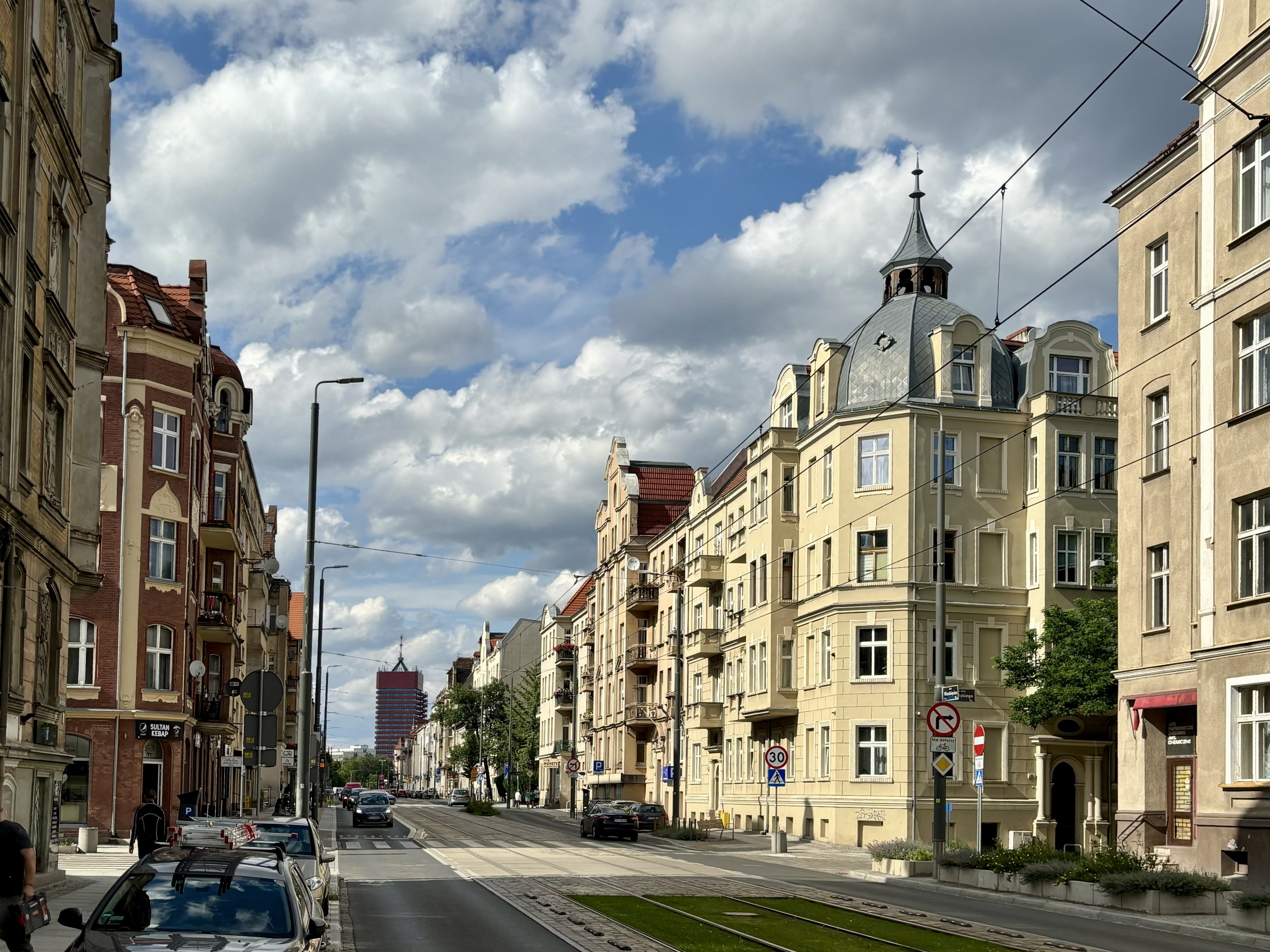
Wierzbięcice Street in Wilda

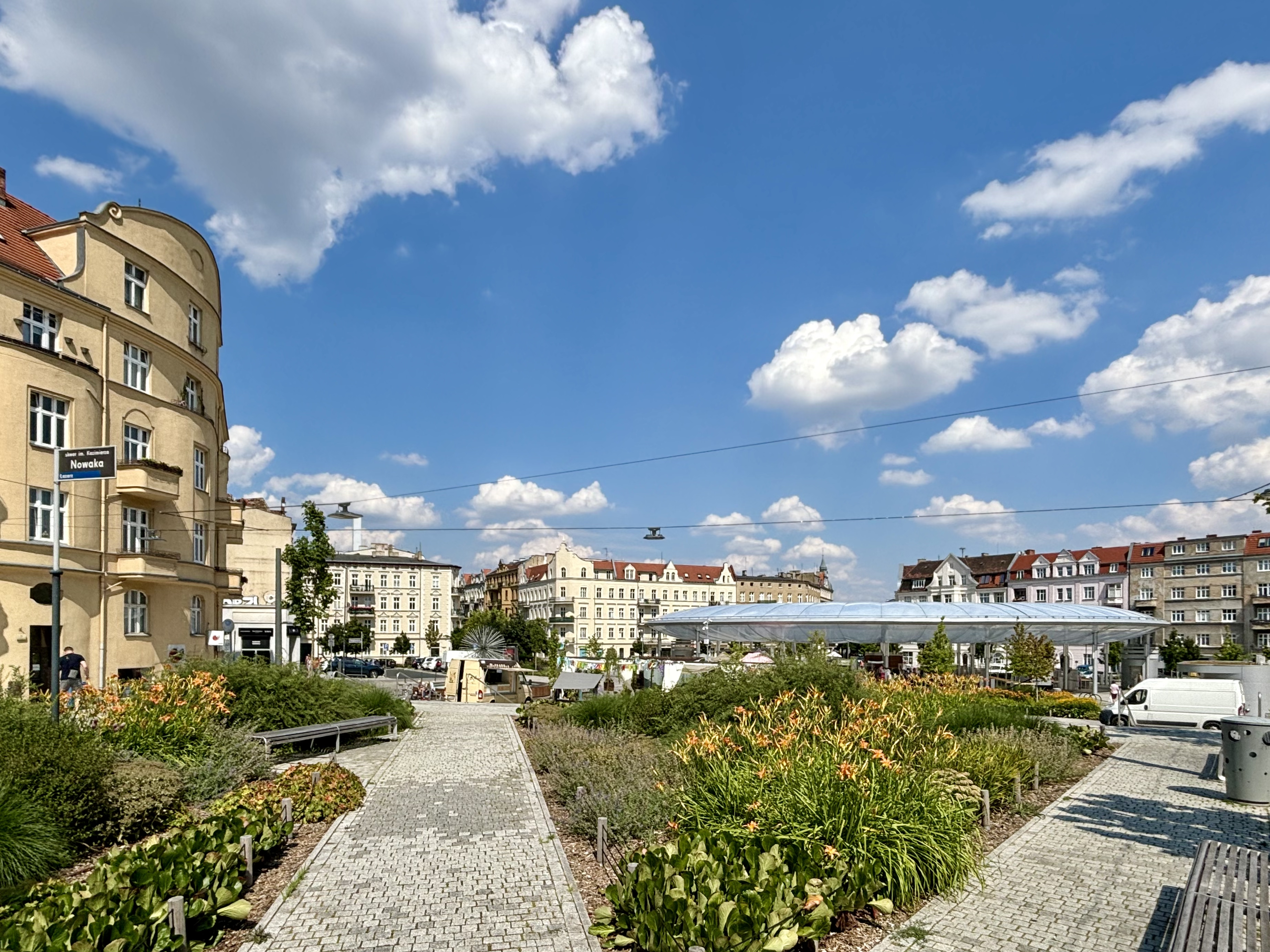
Rynek Łazarski in Grunwald

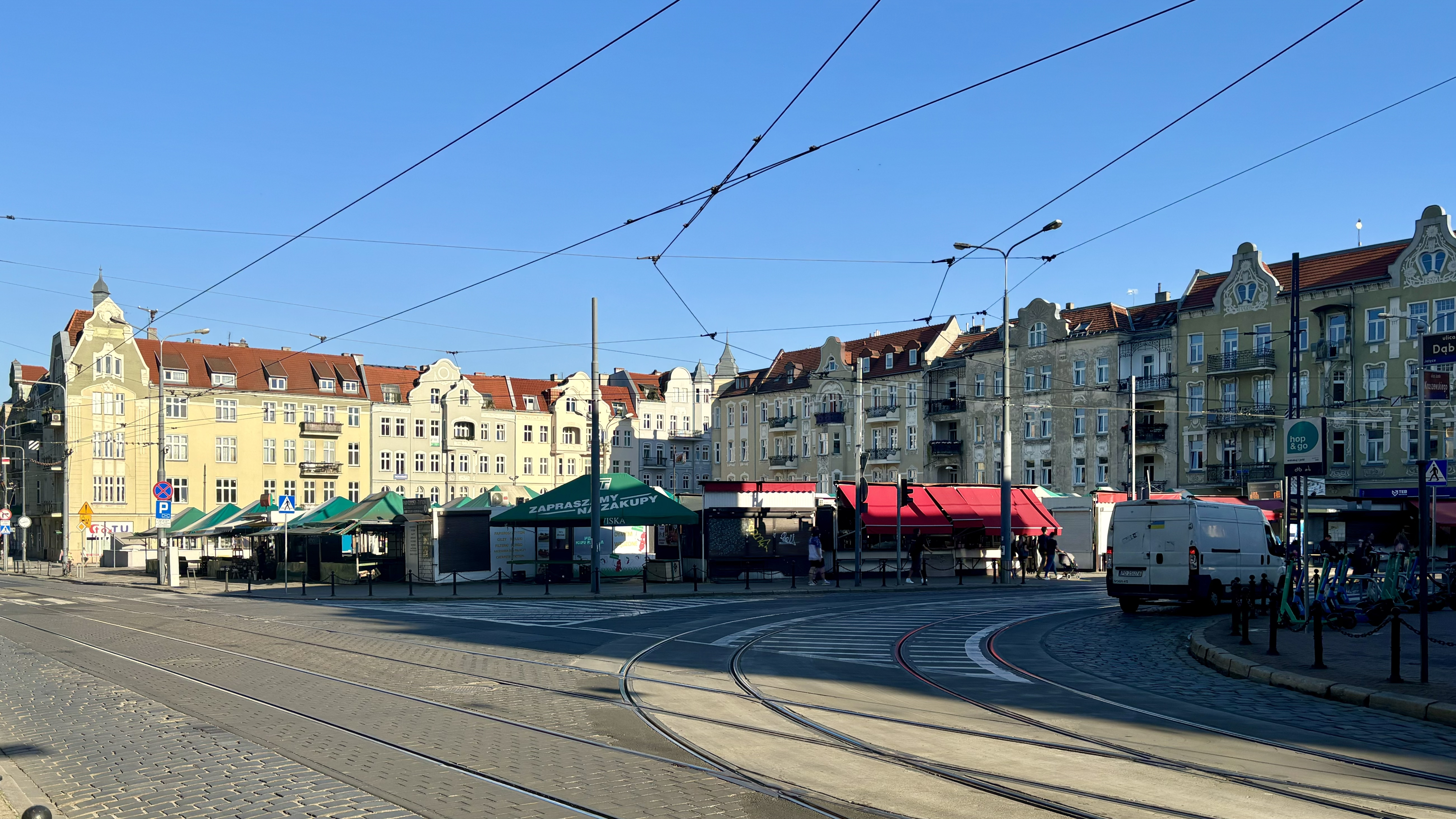
Rynek Jeżycki, main square of Jeżyce

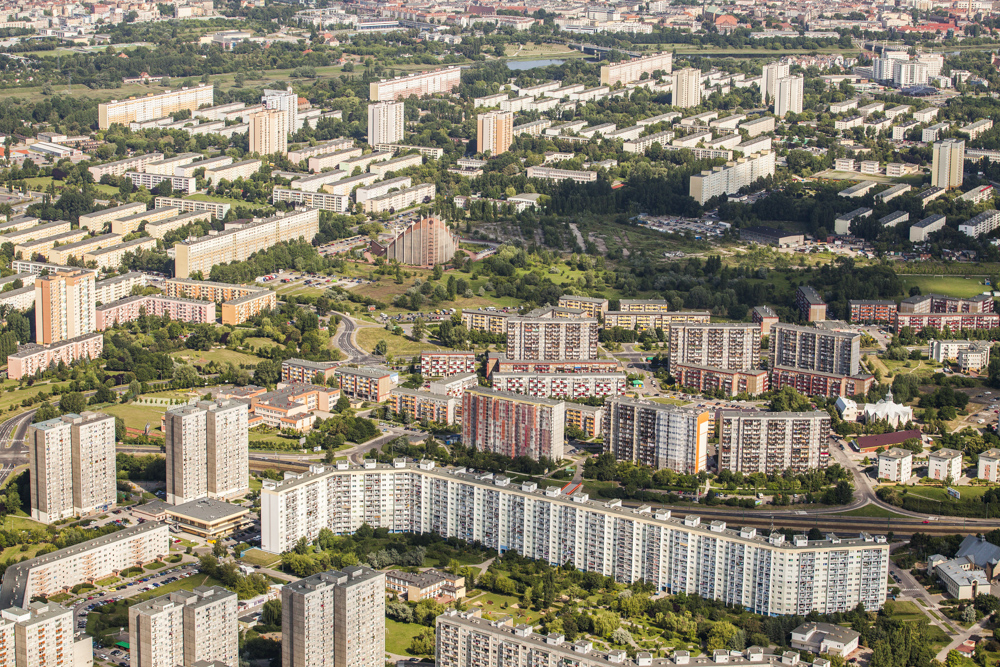
Cityscape of Nowe Miasto

==== Climate ====
Poznań

Climate chart (precipitation, max. and min. temperature)
J	F	M	A	M	J	J	A	S	O	N	D
33 2 −4	27 3 −3	38 8 0	31 14 4	50 20 8	57 22 11	76 25 13	61 24 13	42 19 9	34 13 5	35 7 1	40 3 −2
- █ Average max. and min. temperatures in °C
- █ Precipitation totals in mm
- Source: World Meteorological Organisation
Imperial conversion
J	F	M	A	M	J	J	A	S	O	N	D
1.3 35 26	1.1 38 26	1.5 46 32	1.2 58 38	1.9 67 47	2.2 72 52	3 76 56	2.4 76 55	1.6 66 49	1.3 56 41	1.4 44 34	1.6 37 28
- █ Average max. and min. temperatures in °F
- █ Precipitation totals in inches

The climate of Poznań lies in the transition zone between humid continental and oceanic climate climates. While it was formerly close to the Dfb/Cfb boundary in the Köppen climate classification, climate change and rising temperatures have shifted it more firmly into the Cfb (oceanic climate) category. The city experiences relatively cool winters and warm summers. Snow is rare in winter and usually occurs only when nighttime temperatures fall below freezing. In summer temperatures may often reach 30 °C (86 °F). Annual rainfall is more than 500 mm (20 in), among the lowest in Poland. The rainiest month is July, mainly due to short but intense cloudbursts and thunderstorms. The number of hours of sunshine are among the highest in the country. The warmest temperature was recorded on 11 July 1959 at 38.7 °C (101.7 °F).

Climate data for Poznań (Poznań Airport), elevation: 83 m or 272 ft, 1991–2020 normals, extremes 1951–present
Month	Jan	Feb	Mar	Apr	May	Jun	Jul	Aug	Sep	Oct	Nov	Dec	Year
Record high °C (°F)	15.8 (60.4)	18.1 (64.6)	24.0 (75.2)	30.5 (86.9)	31.8 (89.2)	38.0 (100.4)	38.2 (100.8)	37.1 (98.8)	34.6 (94.3)	27.9 (82.2)	19.9 (67.8)	15.6 (60.1)	38.2 (100.8)
Mean maximum °C (°F)	9.3 (48.7)	11.1 (52.0)	17.3 (63.1)	24.2 (75.6)	27.7 (81.9)	31.5 (88.7)	32.6 (90.7)	32.3 (90.1)	26.9 (80.4)	21.3 (70.3)	14.0 (57.2)	10.1 (50.2)	34.3 (93.7)
Mean daily maximum °C (°F)	2.1 (35.8)	3.7 (38.7)	8.1 (46.6)	15.0 (59.0)	19.8 (67.6)	23.1 (73.6)	25.2 (77.4)	24.9 (76.8)	19.5 (67.1)	13.3 (55.9)	7.1 (44.8)	3.2 (37.8)	13.8 (56.8)
Daily mean °C (°F)	−0.4 (31.3)	0.5 (32.9)	3.8 (38.8)	9.5 (49.1)	14.1 (57.4)	17.5 (63.5)	19.5 (67.1)	19.1 (66.4)	14.3 (57.7)	9.1 (48.4)	4.4 (39.9)	0.9 (33.6)	9.4 (48.9)
Mean daily minimum °C (°F)	−2.9 (26.8)	−2.4 (27.7)	0.0 (32.0)	4.0 (39.2)	8.4 (47.1)	11.9 (53.4)	14.1 (57.4)	13.7 (56.7)	9.6 (49.3)	5.4 (41.7)	1.8 (35.2)	−1.4 (29.5)	5.2 (41.4)
Mean minimum °C (°F)	−13.5 (7.7)	−11.6 (11.1)	−7.8 (18.0)	−3.4 (25.9)	0.9 (33.6)	5.8 (42.4)	8.6 (47.5)	7.2 (45.0)	2.6 (36.7)	−2.8 (27.0)	−5.6 (21.9)	−10.1 (13.8)	−16.1 (3.0)
Record low °C (°F)	−28.5 (−19.3)	−28.0 (−18.4)	−21.4 (−6.5)	−8.6 (16.5)	−3.9 (25.0)	0.5 (32.9)	3.8 (38.8)	3.2 (37.8)	−1.7 (28.9)	−8.3 (17.1)	−15.2 (4.6)	−24.9 (−12.8)	−28.5 (−19.3)
Average precipitation mm (inches)	37.7 (1.48)	30.7 (1.21)	39.9 (1.57)	38.6 (1.52)	53.8 (2.12)	57.5 (2.26)	84.4 (3.32)	55.9 (2.20)	41.2 (1.62)	35.4 (1.39)	33.6 (1.32)	40.1 (1.58)	538.9 (21.22)
Average extreme snow depth cm (inches)	3.9 (1.5)	4.2 (1.7)	2.5 (1.0)	0.6 (0.2)	0.0 (0.0)	0.0 (0.0)	0.0 (0.0)	0.0 (0.0)	0.0 (0.0)	0.1 (0.0)	1.3 (0.5)	3.2 (1.3)	4.2 (1.7)
Average precipitation days (≥ 0.1 mm)	16.47	13.10	13.40	10.20	12.17	12.43	13.60	12.23	10.67	12.93	13.37	16.50	157.06
Average snowy days (≥ 0 cm)	12.7	10.0	4.0	0.4	0.0	0.0	0.0	0.0	0.0	0.1	1.7	6.8	35.7
Average relative humidity (%)	86.9	83.2	76.5	66.8	67.4	68.0	68.6	69.6	76.6	82.7	88.3	88.5	76.9
Mean monthly sunshine hours	50.8	71.8	123.1	211.1	255.4	257.3	268.5	252.7	165.2	112.7	53.9	36.6	1,859
Source 1: Institute of Meteorology and Water Management
Source 2: Meteomodel.pl (records, relative humidity 1991–2020)

Climate data for Poznań (Poznań Airport), elevation: 83 m or 272 ft, 1961–1990 normals and extremes
Month	Jan	Feb	Mar	Apr	May	Jun	Jul	Aug	Sep	Oct	Nov	Dec	Year
Record high °C (°F)	13.2 (55.8)	17.6 (63.7)	24.0 (75.2)	29.9 (85.8)	31.5 (88.7)	33.7 (92.7)	36.4 (97.5)	36.1 (97.0)	34.6 (94.3)	27.9 (82.2)	19.9 (67.8)	15.0 (59.0)	36.4 (97.5)
Mean daily maximum °C (°F)	0.5 (32.9)	2.2 (36.0)	6.8 (44.2)	13.0 (55.4)	18.8 (65.8)	22.1 (71.8)	23.5 (74.3)	23.1 (73.6)	18.7 (65.7)	13.1 (55.6)	6.4 (43.5)	2.2 (36.0)	12.5 (54.6)
Daily mean °C (°F)	−2.0 (28.4)	−1.0 (30.2)	2.7 (36.9)	7.6 (45.7)	13.3 (55.9)	16.7 (62.1)	18.0 (64.4)	17.4 (63.3)	13.4 (56.1)	8.8 (47.8)	3.8 (38.8)	−0.1 (31.8)	8.2 (46.8)
Mean daily minimum °C (°F)	−4.8 (23.4)	−3.9 (25.0)	−0.8 (30.6)	2.8 (37.0)	7.7 (45.9)	11.2 (52.2)	12.5 (54.5)	12.2 (54.0)	9.0 (48.2)	5.3 (41.5)	1.2 (34.2)	−2.6 (27.3)	4.1 (39.5)
Record low °C (°F)	−28.5 (−19.3)	−26.7 (−16.1)	−21.4 (−6.5)	−8.6 (16.5)	−3.0 (26.6)	0.5 (32.9)	4.7 (40.5)	3.2 (37.8)	−1.7 (28.9)	−8.3 (17.1)	−15.2 (4.6)	−24.9 (−12.8)	−28.5 (−19.3)
Average precipitation mm (inches)	30 (1.2)	24 (0.9)	27 (1.1)	36 (1.4)	53 (2.1)	60 (2.4)	69 (2.7)	57 (2.2)	43 (1.7)	39 (1.5)	39 (1.5)	38 (1.5)	515 (20.2)
Average precipitation days (≥ 1.0 mm)	8.1	6.7	6.9	7.3	8.4	8.7	9.2	9.0	7.2	7.1	8.8	9.5	96.9
Mean monthly sunshine hours	40.0	61.0	109.0	152.0	219.0	215.0	218.0	206.0	138.0	102.0	40.0	32.0	1,532
Source: NOAA

== Administration ==
=== Government and politics ===
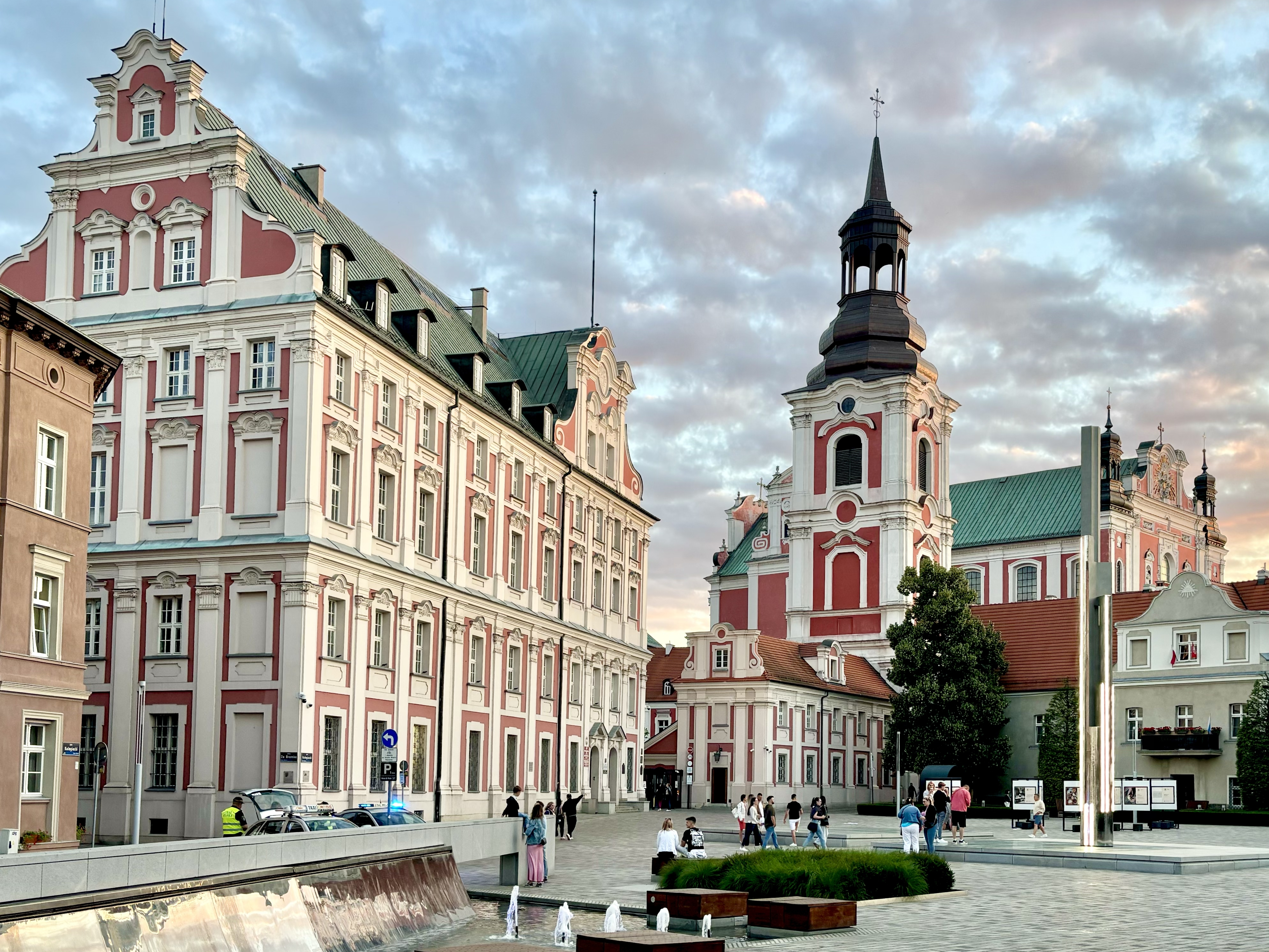
The seat of the City Hall of Poznań is located in the former Jesuit College.

The city of Poznań, serving as the administrative centre of the Greater Poland Voivodeship, houses both the Voivode of Greater Poland and the Marshal of Greater Poland. Poznań, which holds the status of both a municipality and a county city, is home not only to the local authorities of Poznań but also to the authorities of the Poznań County. Additionally, the city hosts the[Union of Polish Cities and the Association of Municipalities and Counties of Greater Poland.

The Poznań City Council is the legislative and supervisory body, elected for a four-year term. The current council members were elected in 2023. The council consists of 37 members. The Chairman of the Poznań City Council is Grzegorz Ganowicz (KO), and the Vice-Chairpersons are Przemysław Alexandrowicz (PiS), Agnieszka Lewandowska (KO), and Halina Owsianna. The council members collaborate within 14 permanent committees.

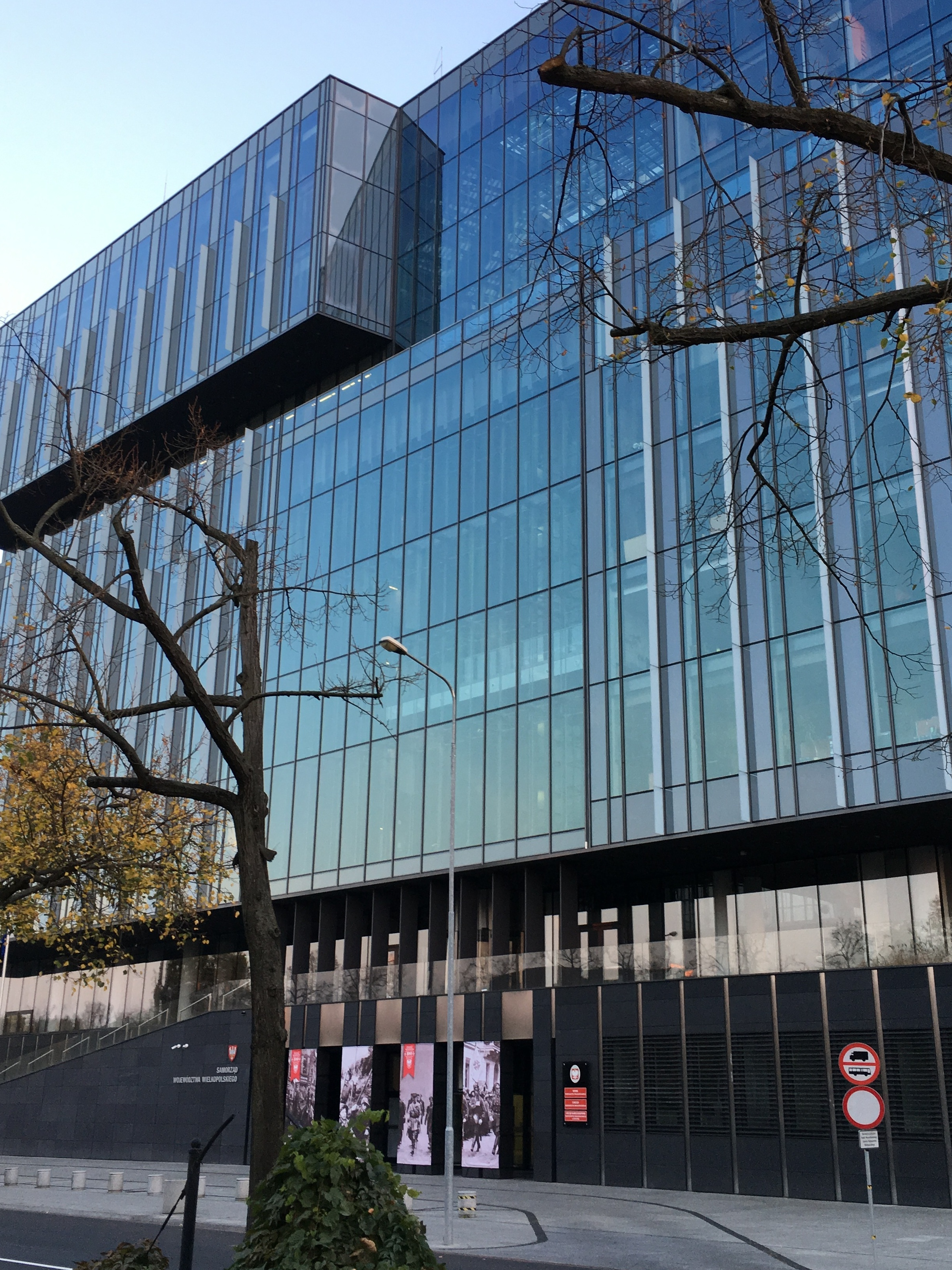
The Marshal's Office of the Greater Poland Voivodeship

The office of the President of Poznań is held by Jacek Jaśkowiak, with the Deputy presidents being Marcin Gołek, Mariusz Wiśniewski, Jędrzej Solarski, and Natalia Weremczuk. The position of City Treasurer is occupied by Barbara Sajnaj, while Stanisław Tamm serves as the City Secretary.

Administrative services for citizens are managed by 30 departments and equivalent organizational units of the City of Poznań Office. Additionally, the city operates 328 municipal organizational units to fulfill various public tasks. Throughout the year, the departments of the City of Poznań Office and municipal administrative units issue approximately 565,000 administrative decisions.

=== Administrative division ===
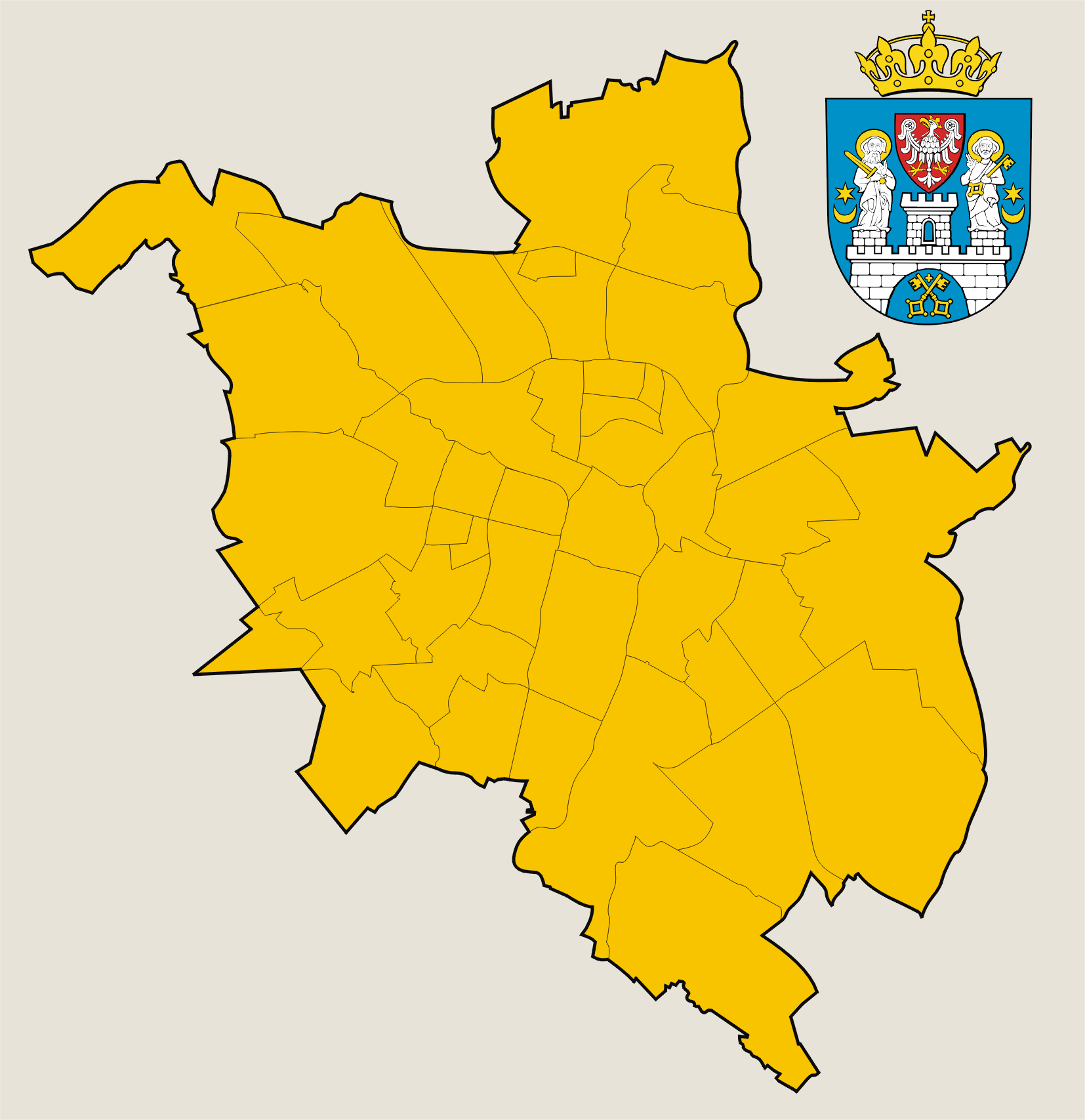
Administrative division into 42 osiedla auxiliary units since 2011.

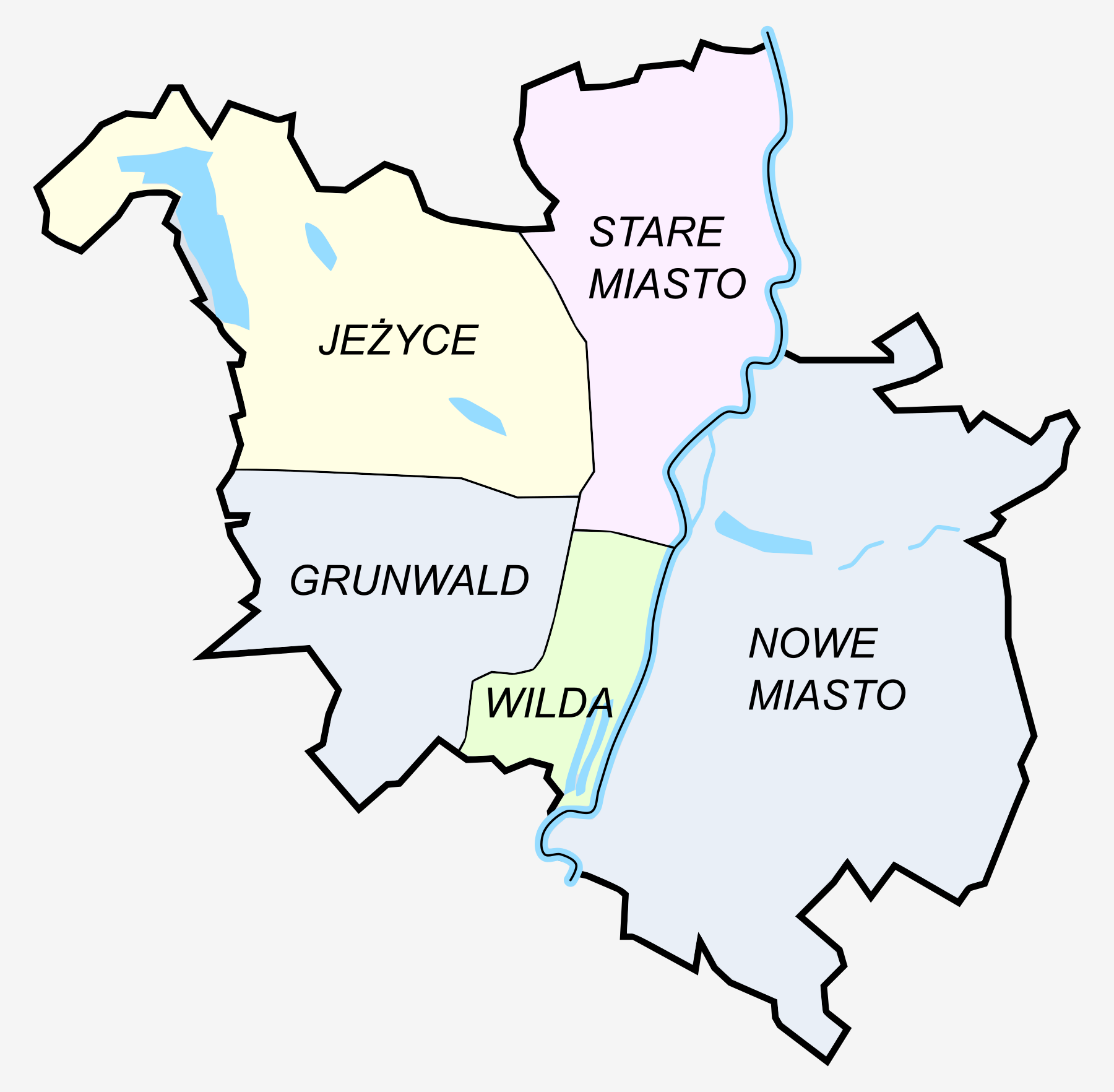
The pre-1990 division into main districts dzielnica, still retained for some administrative purposes and used by locals.

Poznań is divided into 42 neighbourhoods called osiedle, each of which has its own elected council with certain decision-making and spending powers. The first uniform elections for these councils covering the whole area of the city were held on 20 March 2011.

For certain administrative purposes, the old division into five districts called dzielnica is used – although they ceased to be governmental units in 1990. These are:

- Stare Miasto (Old Town), population 161,200, area 47.1 km^{2} (18.2 sq mi), covering the central and northern parts of the city
- Nowe Miasto (New Town), population 141,424, area 105.1 km^{2} (40.6 sq mi), including all parts of the city on the east bank of the Warta
- Grunwald, population 125,500, area 36.2 km^{2} (14.0 sq mi), covering the south-western parts of the city
- Jeżyce, population 81,300, area 57.9 km^{2} (22.4 sq mi), covering the north-western parts of the city
- Wilda, population 62,290, area 15.0 km^{2} (5.8 sq mi), in the southern part of the city

Beginning in the 1990s, the inner city saw its population begin to decline, and a rise in middle income earners moving to suburbs in the greater Poznań County (powiat) area. The Poznań metropolitan area Metropolia Poznań comprising Poznań County and several other communities is home to over 1 million inhabitants. Suburbs including Tarnowo Podgorne and Suchy Las experienced complex and steady economic growth and urbanisation in the 2020s. As of July 2025, Tarnowo Podgorne contains "one company for every four residents," and Suchy Las received recognition in 2024 for its economic performance compared to similarly-sized municipalities in Poland.

== Architecture ==
=== Gothic ===
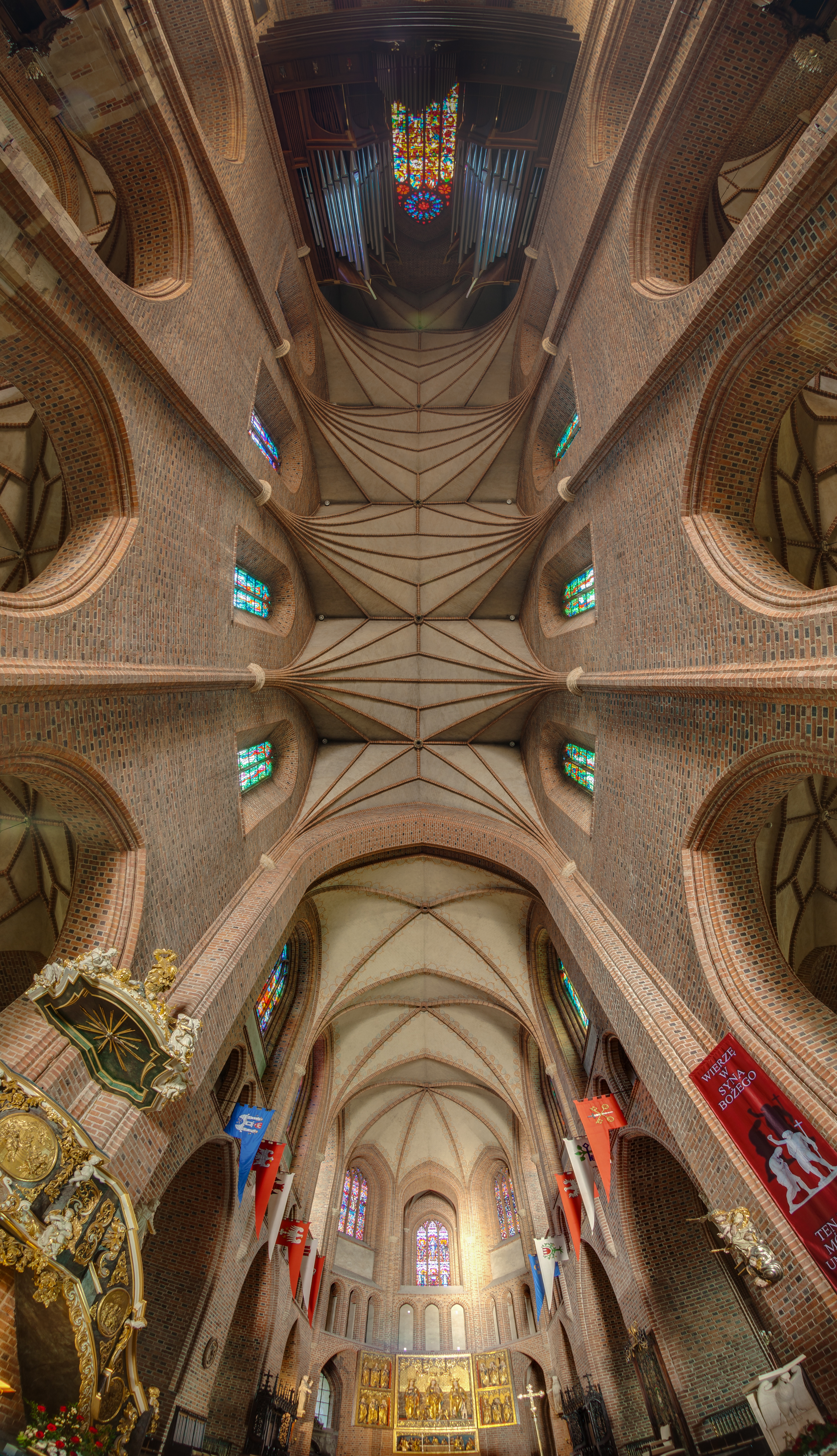
Cathedral vault

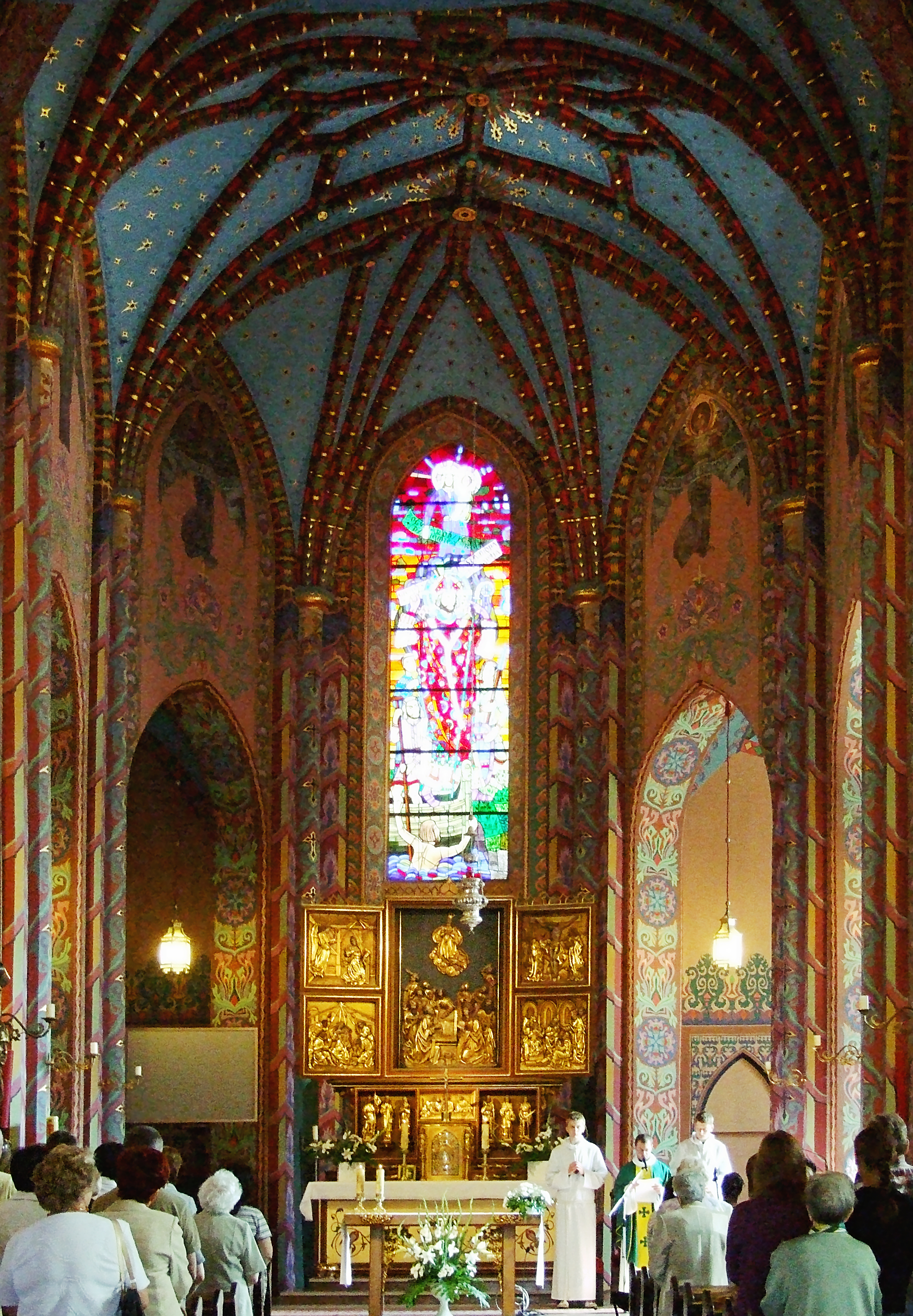
Polychromes in St. Adalbert's Church.

The relocation of Poznań from the right to the left bank of the Warta River occurred in the mid-13th century, during the height of the Gothic architecture. This significant urban shift led to the preservation of numerous Gothic structures, both religious and secular, on both sides of the Warta River, within the area of the former chartered town. The Gothic style in Poznań flourished from approximately the mid-13th century to the end of the 15th century.

The Archcathedral Basilica of St. Peter and St. Paul on Ostrów Tumski is considered the most important Gothic sacred building in Poznań. Its current form emerged following a 14th–15th century reconstruction that replaced an earlier pre-Romanesque and Romanesque church. The Gothic design of the three-aisled basilica, with a presbytery surrounded by an ambulatory and a ring of chapels, was consolidated through post-World War II restorations aimed at recovering the cathedral's medieval character. The spatial layout exhibits all the hallmarks of mature Gothic architecture. The interior is unified by a system of cross-rib vaults in the main nave and lierne vaults in the presbytery, supported by slender pillars. The vertical division includes pointed inter-nave arcades and a triforium gallery. The western façade is flanked by two massive towers with pointed pinnacles, between which rises a stepped gable adorned with ceramic decoration and a large rose window. The dominant building material is red, hand-formed brick, typical of North European Gothic. However, the Poznań cathedral embodies not only the broader tradition of Brick Gothic but also features specific elements of Polish Gothic, visible in both spatial organization and architectural detailing. Particularly characteristic of the local tradition are thick structural walls and the decorative use of clinker brick (zendrówka – dark, overfired brick often used for visual contrast in elevations). Another feature of Polish Gothic is the presence of numerous side chapels, designed as individual recesses set between buttresses – a solution typical of cathedrals founded by the Piast dynasty.

Notable Gothic sites in the older, right-bank part of the city include:

- Church of the Blessed Virgin Mary (in summo) – erected on the site of a former princely palatium, this church originally housed a chapel founded around 965. The present structure was developed in several phases, with the nave constructed in the first half of the 15th century.
- Church of Saint John of Jerusalem outside the walls – built by the Knights Hospitaller at the turn of the 12th and 13th centuries, it is among the earliest brick churches in Poland.
- Church of St. Margaret – dating from the late 12th century, this church served the religious needs of Śródka, then the most populous area of the Poznań settlement complex. The Baroque interior, largely created in the 17th century, harmonizes with the Gothic architecture.

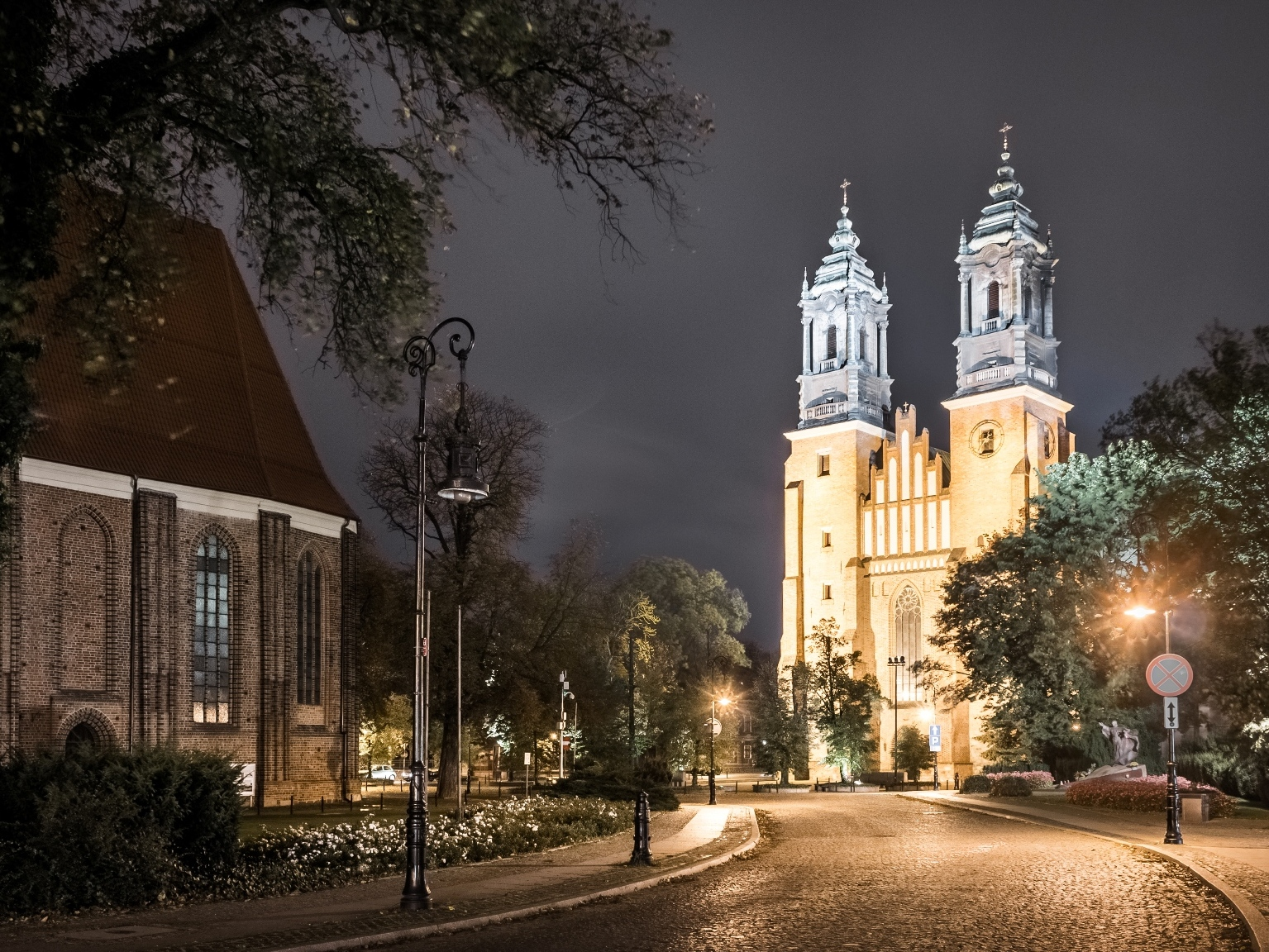
Cathedral and Church of Holy Virgin Mary on the left.

In the left-bank part of the city, the most prominent Gothic monuments include:

- Church of St. Adalbert – a three-nave pseudo-basilica, built on a rectangular trapezoidal plan, located on St. Adalbert's Hill.
- Church of Our Lady Help of Christians and Salesian Monastery – inside, above the presbytery, a unique type of Gothic rib vaulting, known as the Piast vault, can be found, while the northern nave features a star vault.
- Church of the Sacred Heart of Jesus and Our Lady of Consolation – the oldest surviving church on the left bank of Warta.
- Church of St. Martin – likely constructed by Duke Przemysł I in 1240.
- Church of Corpus Christi and former Carmelite Monastery – the largest Gothic church in Poznań after the cathedral, this site was a major pilgrimage destination in the Middle Ages. The current form of the church and monastery resulted from reconstruction work between 1465 and 1470.

=== Renaissance ===
The introduction of the Renaissance to Poznań resulted in the construction of many grand buildings. Noteworthy among these is the Town Hall, an exemplary piece of Renaissance architecture in Poland. The Town Hall underwent a significant reconstruction in the mid-16th century, after a fire in 1536. The city authorities entrusted the reconstruction to Giovanni Battista di Quadro from Lugano in 1550. He expanded the building westward by approximately 11 meters and added an additional floor. The reconstruction was completed in 1560. The Renaissance Town Hall is characterized by its rectangular plan, three-story loggia on the facade, and three polygonal turrets. The central turret houses a clock mechanism featuring goats, a popular attraction in Poznań since 1551. The attic frieze depicts Jagiellonian kings, while the blind arcades feature rulers from the Piast dynasty.

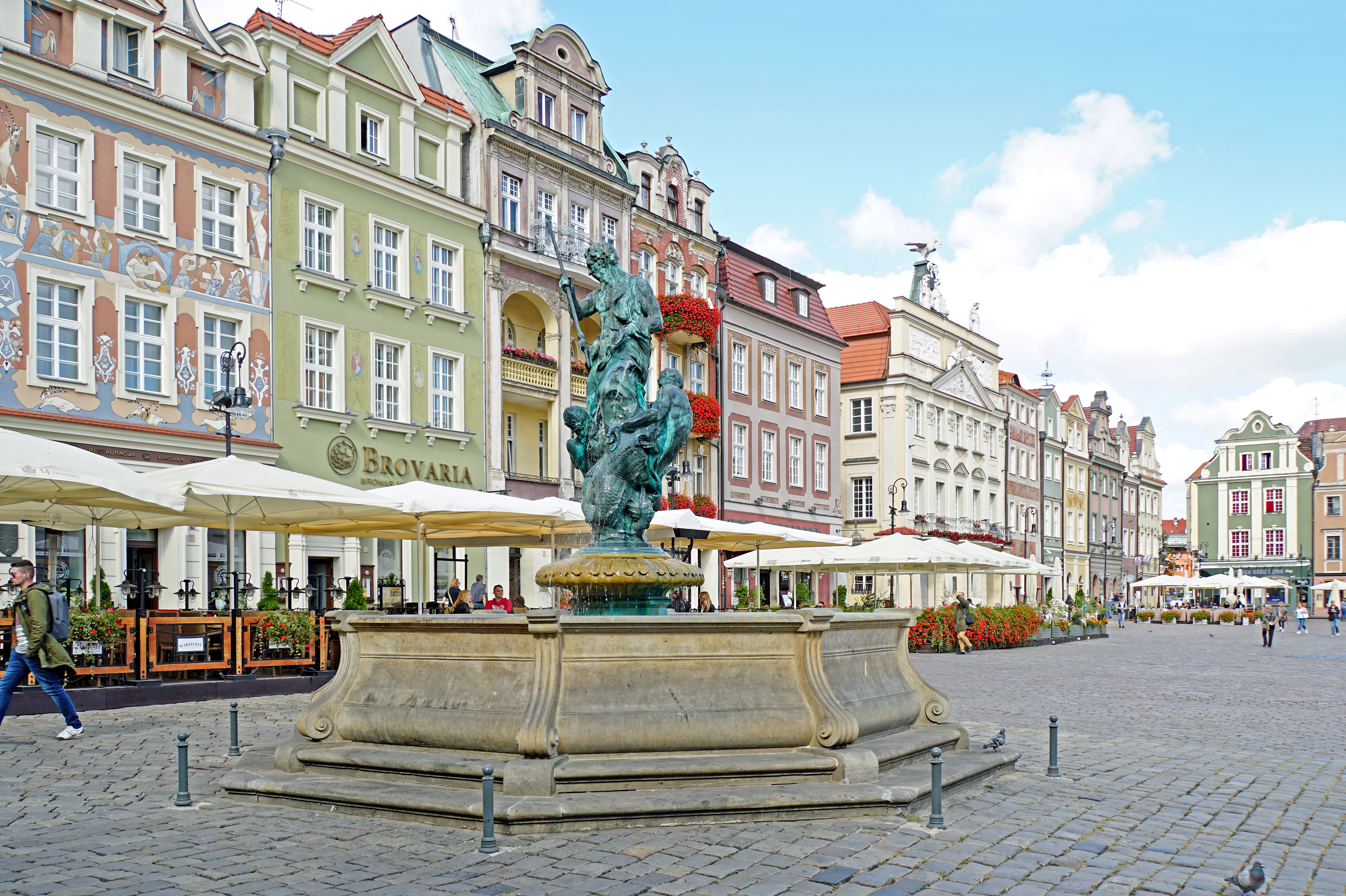
Merchants' houses at Old Market Square

Most of the tenement façades around the Old Market Square exhibit a Renaissance character. The town hall is surrounded by guild houses from the 16th century, distinguished by a rhythmic arrangement of windows separated by lesenes, as well as decorative attics and rusticated arcades. The façades were often adorned with sgraffito or heraldic motifs—a testament to the decorative and symbolic values of the Renaissance. A distinctive feature is the adaptation of Gothic vaulting structures (rib vaults) to the new Renaissance order.

An example of a representative urban residence from Renaissance-era Poznań is the Górka Palace, currently housing the Archaeological Museum. The building was constructed between 1545 and 1549 through the reconstruction of several Gothic townhouses for Andrzej Górka, the Starost General of Greater Poland. The Renaissance entrance portal, made of sandstone, is likely the work of an Italian artist. The entrance archway with a semicircular arch is framed by pilasters supporting a lintel. The rich ornamentation includes laurel leaf festoons, cornucopias, masks, and grotesque-vegetal motifs. The portal leads to an inner courtyard surrounded by a three-winged arcaded cloister. The palace stands out with its architecture that reflects the late Renaissance order on a residential scale and serves as an example of Italian Mannerist influence on 16th-century urban architecture.

=== Baroque ===
The Baroque, which began to develop in Poznań in the second half of the 17th century, brought a sense of monumentality to the urban space. The architecture of this period was supported by Counter-Reformation orders and the urban elite. From the Baroque period, the Poznań Fara or Collegiate Basilica of Our Lady of Perpetual Help, St. Mary Magdalene, and St. Stanislaus Bishop stands out as one of the most significant Baroque structures in Poland. The construction of this church began in the mid-17th century under the guidance of prominent Baroque architects such as Giovanni Catenazzi, Tomasz Poncino, and Pompeo Ferrari. The church was finally consecrated in 1705, although it was not fully completed at the time. The interior of the basilica is characterized by a monumental three-aisled layout with a transept and galleries, with columns made of red artificial marble supporting the vaults and organ galleries. One of the most remarkable features is the illusionistic dome—in reality, a painted pseudo-dome on the ceiling that creates an optical impression of depth.

Many other examples of Baroque sacred architecture have been preserved in Poznań, among which two Franciscan churches stand out. The Church of St. Anthony of Padua, built between 1674 and 1728 according to a design by Jerzy Catenazzi, is a representative example of late Baroque architecture already bearing signs of Classicism. The interior is richly decorated with stuccowork and polychromes executed between 1702 and 1735 by the brothers Adam and Antoni Swach. The paintings in the presbytery and main nave depict scenes from the life of St. Francis, while the Chapel of the Blessed Virgin Mary contains the revered image of Our Lady of Poznań. The Church of St. Francis, originally Gothic, was thoroughly rebuilt in the Baroque style between 1661 and 1668. Its façade, completed in the 18th century, features a characteristic tiered composition with towers rising 29 meters high, topped with roof lanterns and late Baroque domes. Between the pilasters and cornices are niches containing statues of Franciscan saints from 1730. On the southern side adjoins the preserved Chapel of Our Lady of Loreto, dating from the 18th century, which houses a Renaissance-style Holy House modelled after the Santa Casa in Loreto. This church exemplifies the adaptation of a medieval structure to the new Baroque aesthetic.

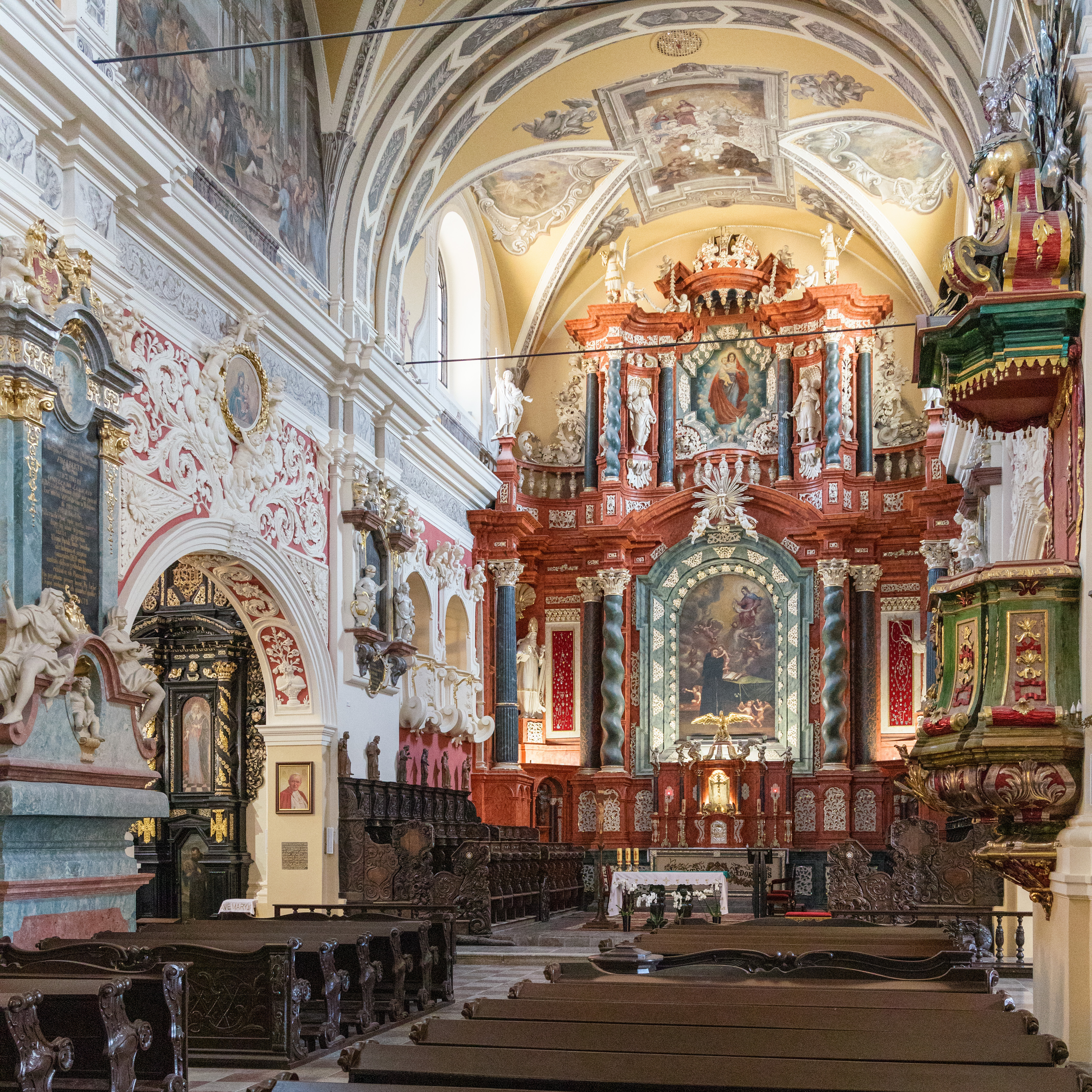
Church of St. Anthony of Padua interior

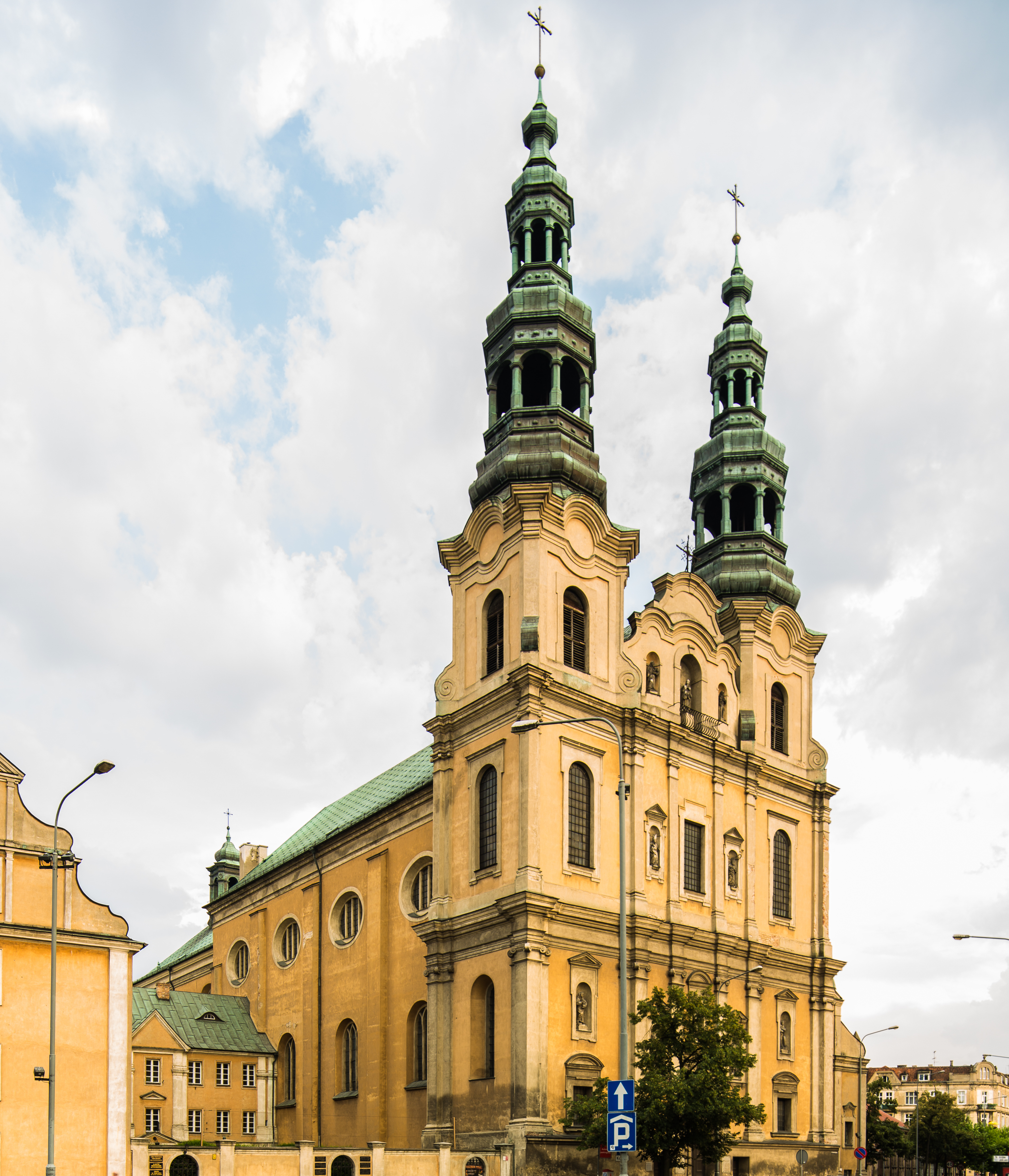
Church of St. Francis

Among the examples of secular Baroque architecture, a special place is occupied by the Działyński Palace, built between 1773 and 1776 according to a design by Antoni Höhne. Although the building represents a transitional phase between the Baroque and Classicism, it retains many features characteristic of the late Baroque style. The façade is structured in a classical pilaster order, with symmetrically arranged window openings and a simple crowning cornice. The interior of the palace—particularly the representative Red Hall—features rich stucco decoration in the Rococo style. The hall contains stuccowork likely designed by Jan Chrystian Kamsetzer, along with representations of Kings Stephen Bathory, Władysław IV, and John III Sobieski. Additionally, there are two pairs of sculptures by Augustyn Schöps, depicting Władysław the Elbow-high and Casimir the Great, as well as Władysław Jagiełło and Duke Vytautas. The Red Hall played an important representative role and served as a venue for meetings, lectures, and cultural events.

Other significant examples of Baroque architecture include the Jesuit College, the Basilica of St. Joseph and the Carmelite Monastery, and the Church of St. Casimir.

=== Art Nouveau ===
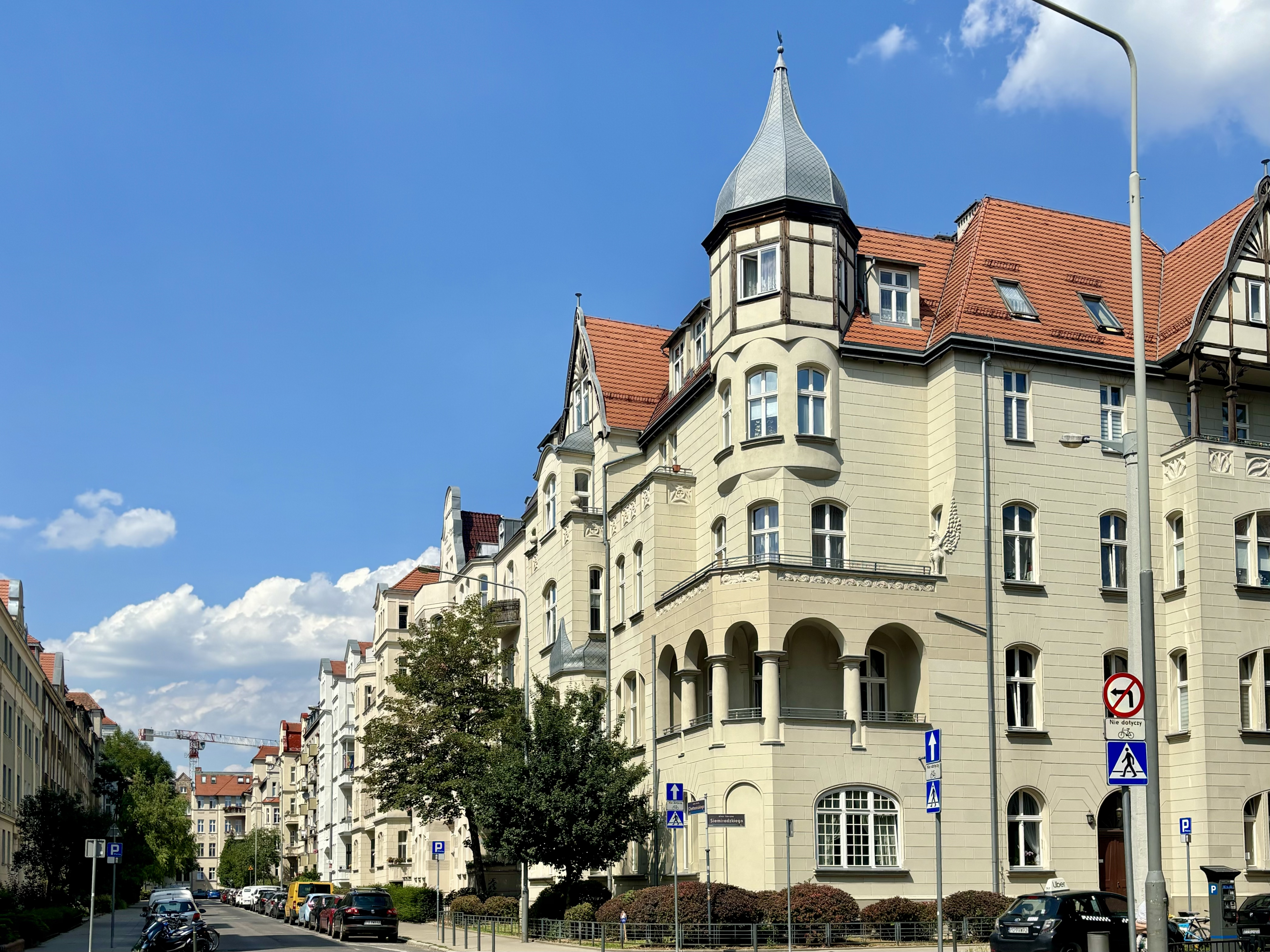
Johow-Gelände, a housing estate implemented according to an urban planning scheme by Max Johow.

The early 20th-century expansion of Poznań to include Jeżyce, Wilda, and Łazarz facilitated the development of new architectural spaces. The demolition of the city's fortifications also allowed for the construction of permanent buildings on former fortress grounds. During this period, numerous new urban developments and residential complexes were established.

One of them is the so-called Johow-Gelände in the Łazarz district, based on an urban concept by Max Johow, one of the leading architects in Poznań at the beginning of the 20th century. The tenement houses, built in a dense layout without backyards, were preceded by front gardens and, in addition to the high standard of the apartments, also impressed with richly decorated entrance halls and varied building facades. Numerous Art Nouveau tenement houses can also be found on neighbouring streets such as Matejki, Wyspiańskiego, and Małeckiego.

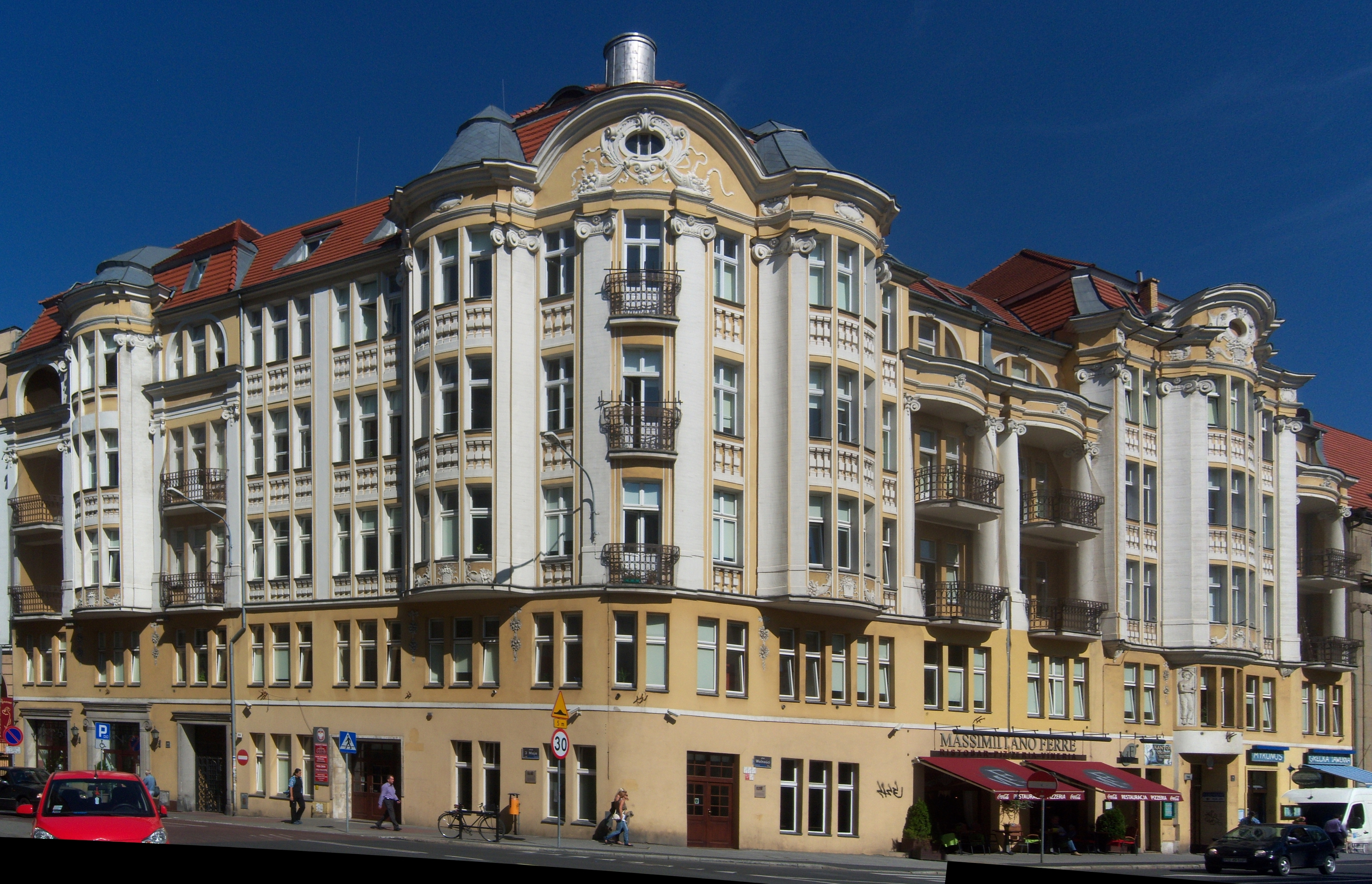
Art Nouveau tenement house at 14 Wolności Square.

In the early 20th century, many residential developments also emerged in the Jeżyce district, including a complex of villa-style tenements on Roosevelta Street, designed by the architectural firm of Herman Böhmer and Paul Preul for the German Civil Servants' Housing Cooperative. Particularly noteworthy are the wrought iron grilles at 5 Roosevelta Street and the oversized bas-relief of a naked woman supporting the balcony on the facade of building number 4. Nearby there is also the New Theatre, constructed in 1906, designed by the same architects, which facade design reflects Art Nouveau typical of the German region, featuring geometric forms with varied colors and textures. Similar architecture can be found in the central part of Jeżyce, along streets such as Dąbrowskiego, Kraszewskiego, Mickiewicza, Prusa, and Słowackiego.

Among the notable Art Nouveau structures are Oskar Hoffman's tenement house at 69 Święta Marcin Street or tenement house at 14 Wolności Square.

=== Revival architecture and Neoclassicism ===
The Romanesque Revival, Renaissance Revival and Neoclassical architectural styles are particularly visible in the area of the former Imperial District. In 1903, architect Josef Stübben presented a plan for the construction of a new district in the area of the demolished fortifications (located at the intersection of today's Święty Marcin and Kościuszki streets), which was realized between 1904 and 1910.

The central point of this district is the Imperial Castle, built between 1905 and 1910 for Wilhelm II. Over the years, the Castle's purpose has evolved. During the interwar period, university lectures were held in its halls, during World War II, the building was adapted to serve as Hitler's headquarters, and since the 1960s, it has functioned as a cultural centre. Inside, one can find the Pałacowe Cinema, a modern concert hall, exhibition spaces, a library, a bookstore, a café, educational rooms, and areas for visitors to explore the castle's historical rooms.

The heart of the district is Adam Mickiewicz Square, featuring a monument to the poet. At the boundary of the square and Adam Mickiewicz Park there is a monument commemorating the Victims of June 1956. The district's buildings are located around the square and along Święty Marcin and Fredry streets.

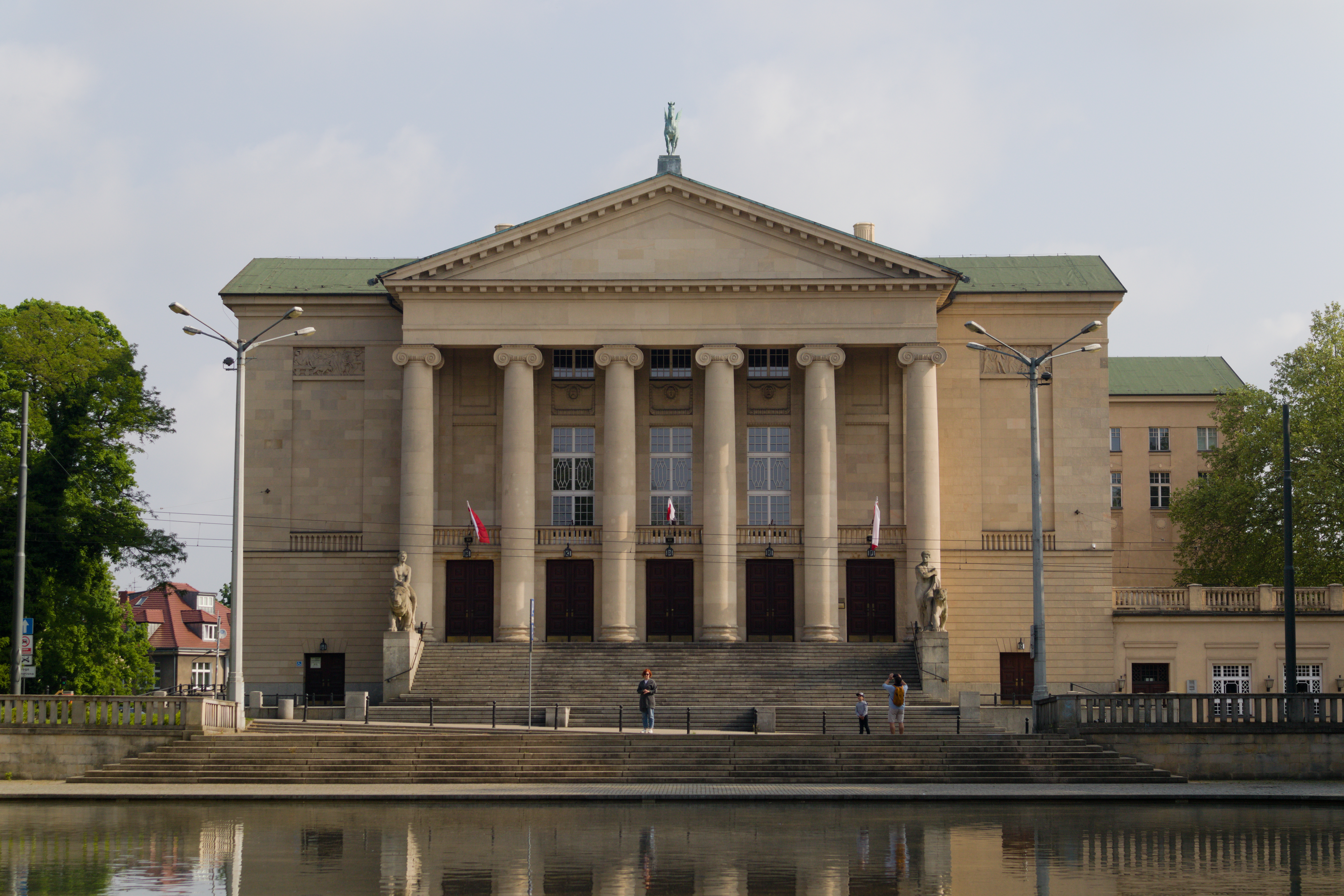
The neoclassical Grand Theatre in Poznań.

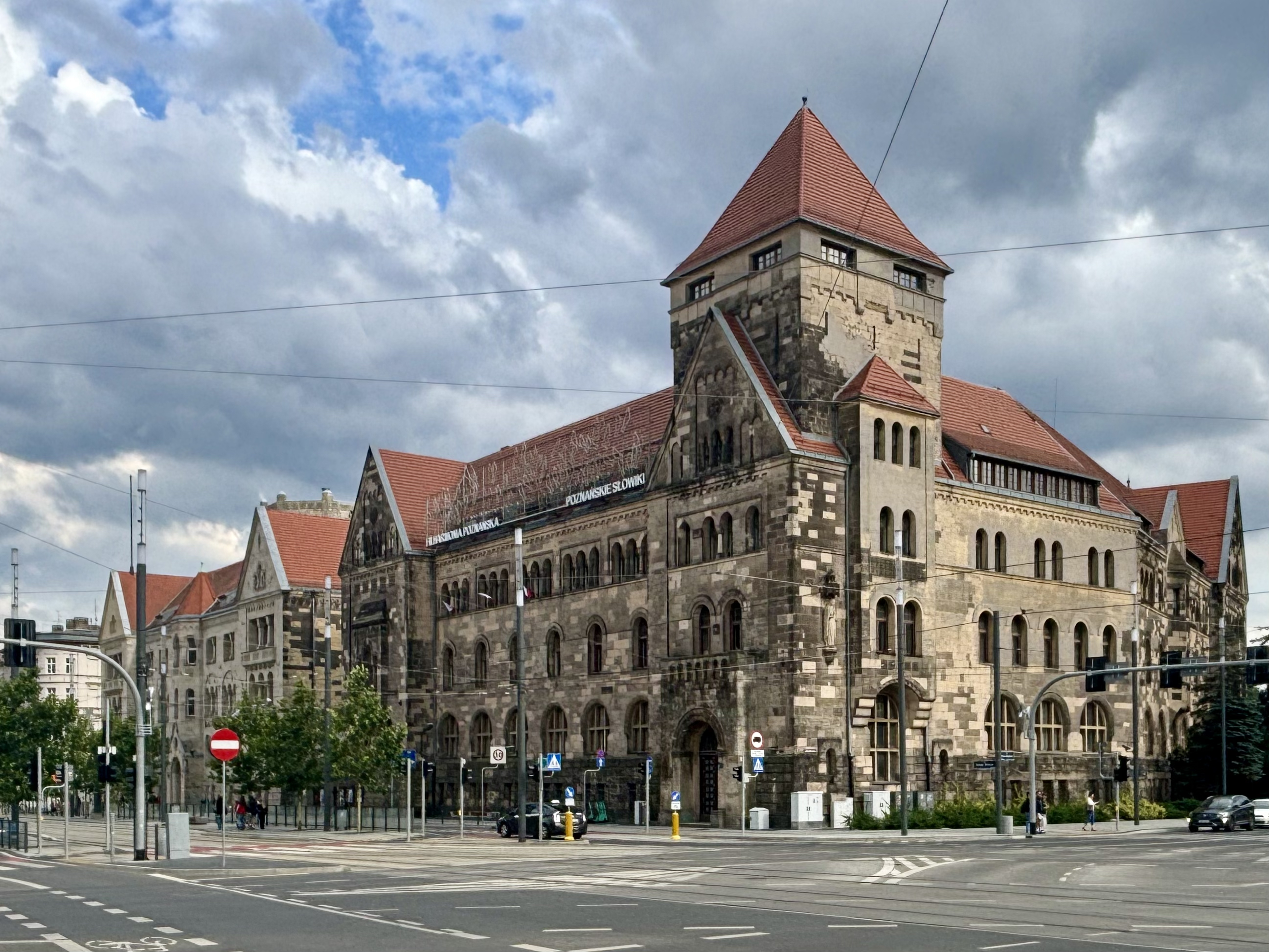
The Poznań Philharmonic built in the Romanesque Revival style.

The Municipal Theater – now the Grand Theater, 1910, architect Max Littmann – inspired by the Villa Rotonda in Vicenza; Collegium Maius (formerly the Colonization Commission), 1908–1910, with a monument to the founder of the Polish university, Professor Heliodor Święcicki, in front of the building; Adolf Landsberg's Villa, 1911; Institute of Hygiene, 1912; Collegium Minus, 1905–1910; Music Academy (formerly the Evangelical House – Evangelisches Vereinhaus), 1907–1908; Collegium Iuridicum (formerly the Raiffeisen Cooperative Bank), 1907; Poznań Philharmonic, 1910; and Post Office Directorate, 1910.

In addition to the Imperial Castle, the most important buildings in the Imperial District include: To the west, the district is enclosed by a semicircular line of parks that were created on the site of the 19th-century fortifications of Poznań Fortress. In the following years, an informal university district developed to the south of the Imperial District, featuring buildings of the Music Academy, the University of Economics, and Adam Mickiewicz University.

=== Modernism ===
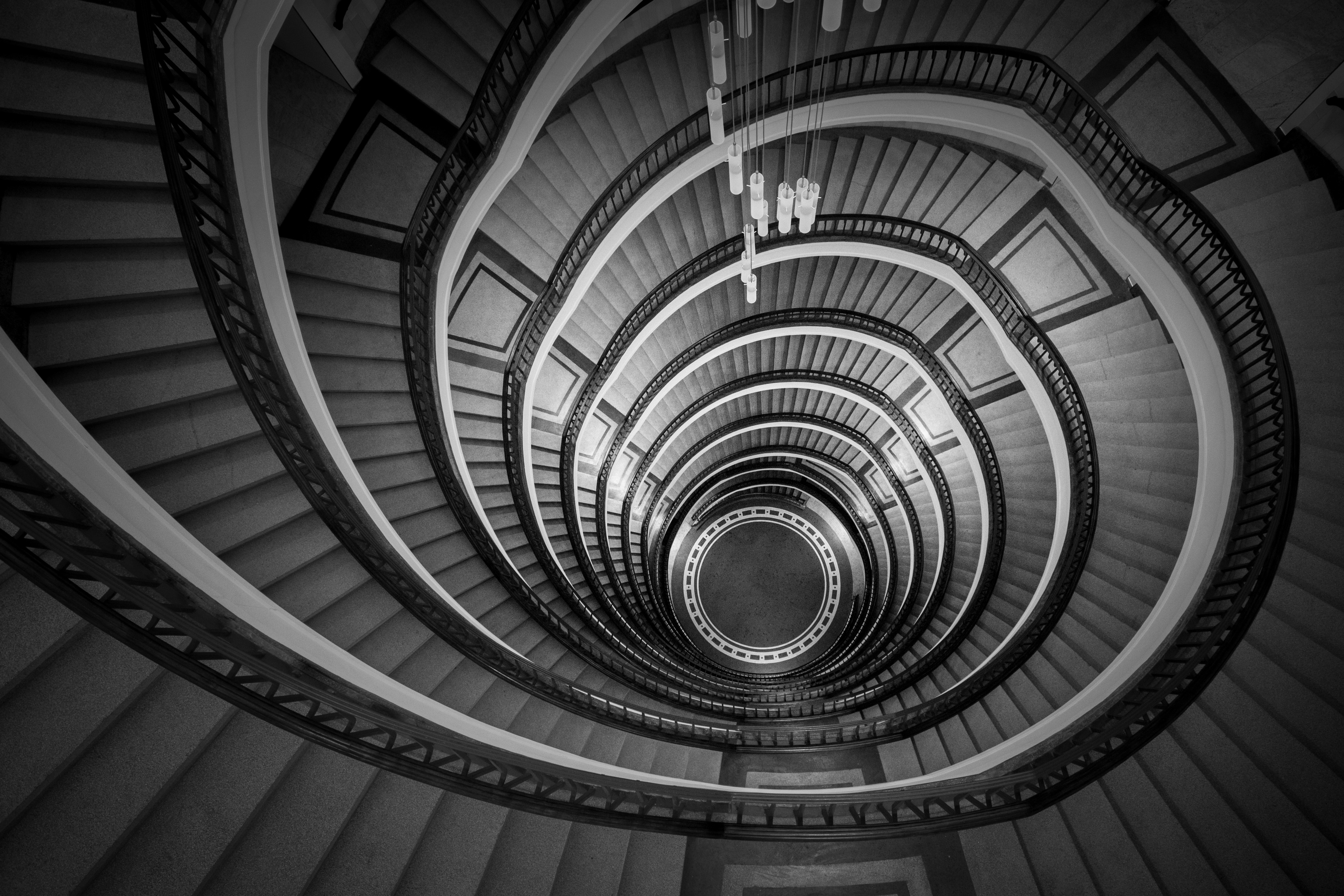
The staircase of the modernist Universal Department Store Okrąglak (1954).

Modern architecture in Poznań began to emerge in the 1930s with buildings like the ZUS office on Dąbrowskiego Street, continuing through the 1980s. The Okrąglak, constructed between 1949 and 1954, is a prominent example, designed by architect Marek Leykam. Built on a circular plan using prefabricated elements, its nine-story cylindrical structure features a flat roof with a central skylight and a surrounding terrace. The facade, without a dominant elevation, is characterized by a glass surface divided by rectangular window openings and vertical "razor blade" partitions.

Other examples of modernist architecture in Poznań include the Alfa Towers on Święty Marcin and the Poznan University of Physical Education building on Królowej Jadwigi Street. Another important modernist monument is the Arena Hall, which was built in 1974 and was inspired by the shape of the Palazzetto dello Sport, a hall constructed in Rome several years earlier.

=== Contemporary architecture ===
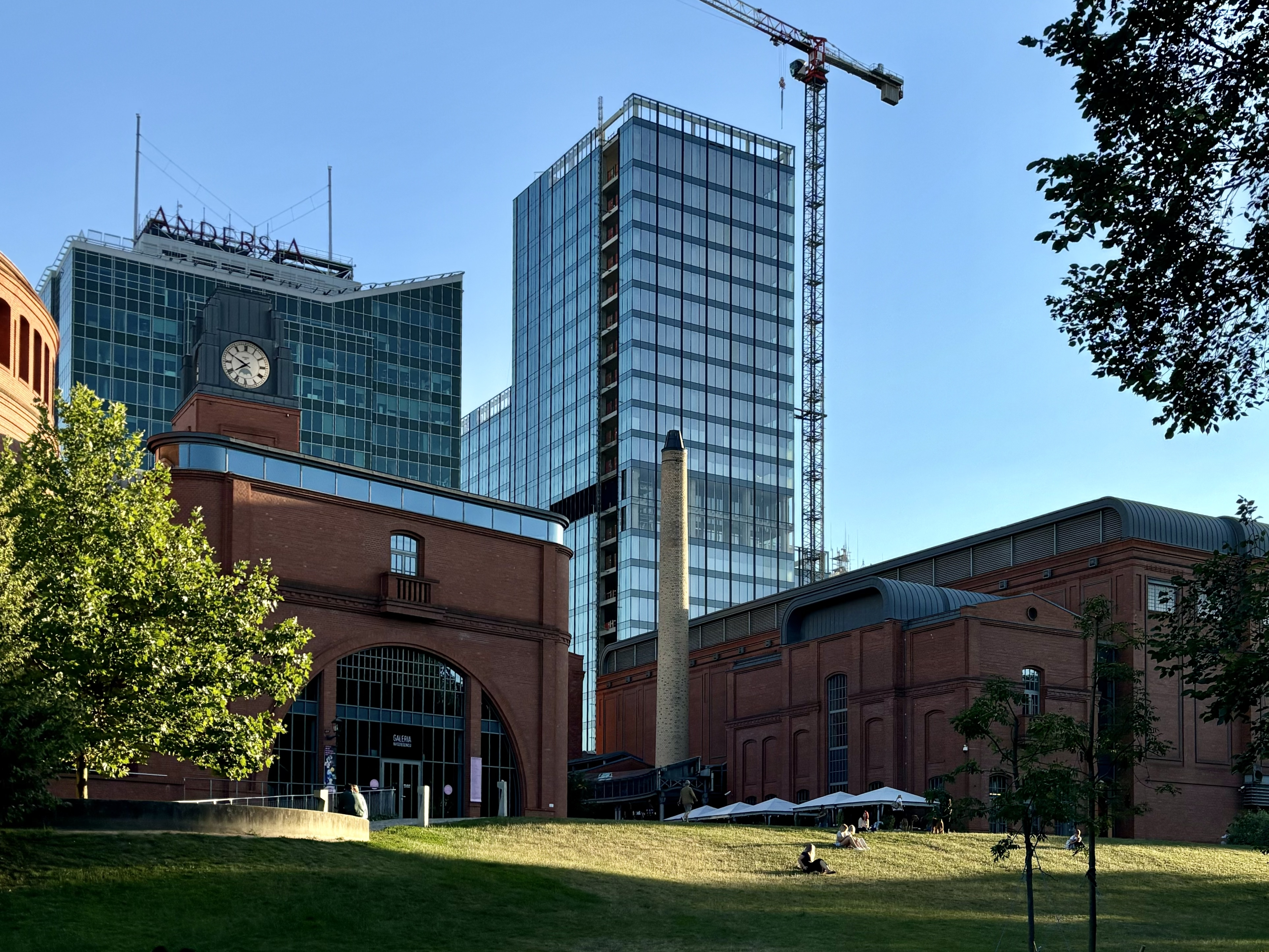
Office buildings near Stary Browar.

The development of postmodernism in Poznań began at the start of the 21st century, primarily influencing office architecture. One of the most acclaimed buildings, which has received numerous awards, is Bałtyk—a 16-story office tower located near Rondo Kaponiera. This project marked the first realization in Poland by one of the world's most renowned architectural firms, MVRDV. The unique form of the building gives it a different appearance from every angle—it appears to expand or contract, simultaneously slender and expansive. Other notable examples of modern architecture include the Porta Posnania, the Andersia office complex, Pixel, and the Nowy Rynek office complex.

A significant trend in the city's architecture is the modernization of historical buildings and their integration with contemporary elements, exemplified by Stary Browar. This complex was developed on the site of the 19th-century Hugger Brewery. The shopping centre largely consists of new forms, styled to resemble historical ones and based on the iconography of 19th-century industrial architecture.

== Culture and heritage ==
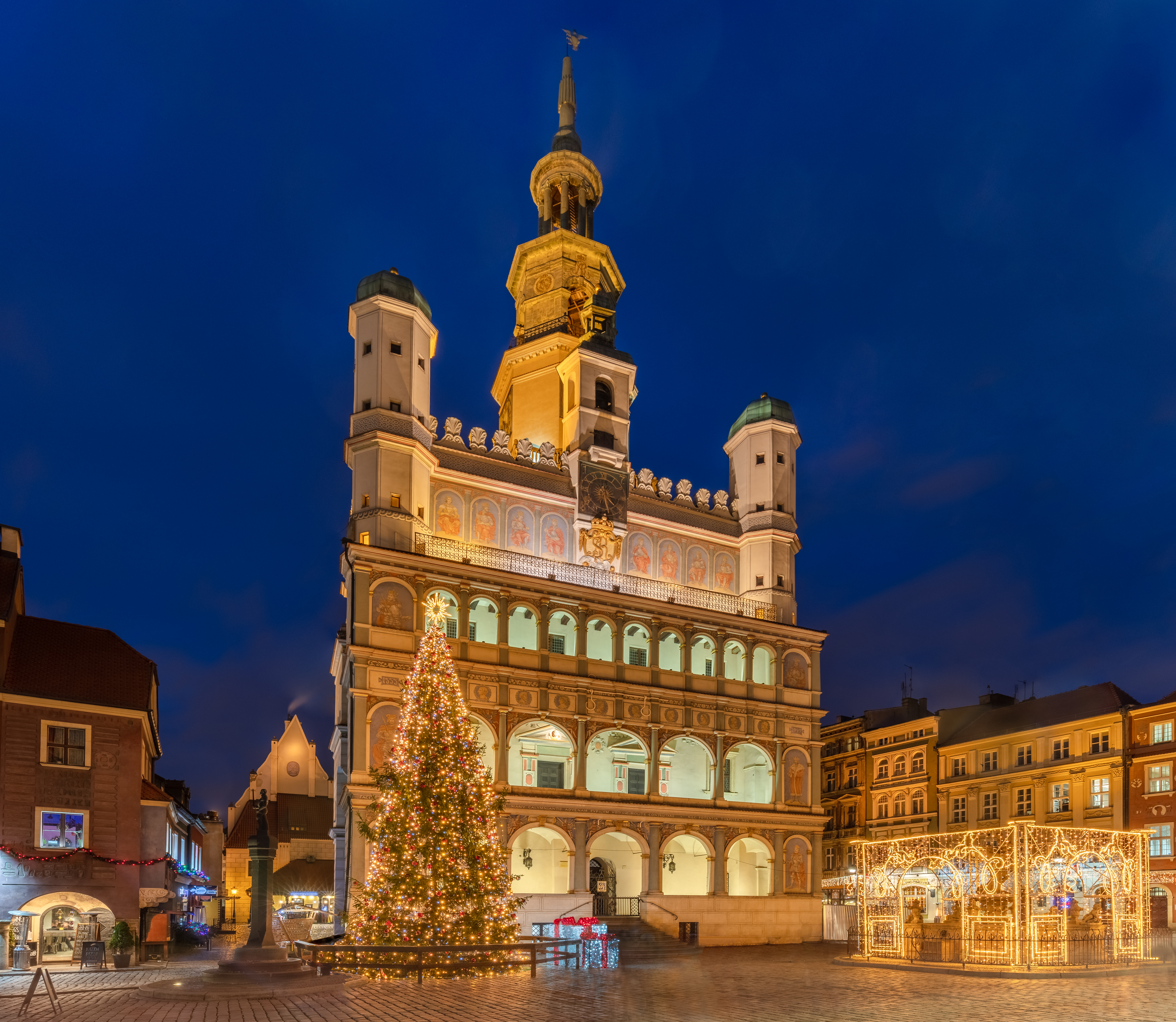
The Renaissance Town Hall (1560, originally built in the late 13th century) now houses a museum.

Poznań possesses many historic buildings and heritage sites, mostly concentrated around the Old Town and other parts of the city centre. Many of these lie on the tourist Royal-Imperial Route – a walk leading through the most important parts of the city showing its history, culture and identity. Parts of the city centre are listed as one of Poland's official national historic monuments, as designated 28 November 2008, along with other portions of the city's historic core. Its listing is maintained by the National Heritage Board of Poland.

Apart from traditional theatres with a long history such as Teatr Wielki, Teatr Polski, Teatr Nowy, and others like Teatr Animacji, Teatr Muzyczny and Polish Dance Theatre, Poznań is also home to a growing number of different kind of alternative theatre groups. It is believed that even up to 30 more or less known groups may work in the city, and thus, the city has recently become a new Polish off-theatre performance centre.

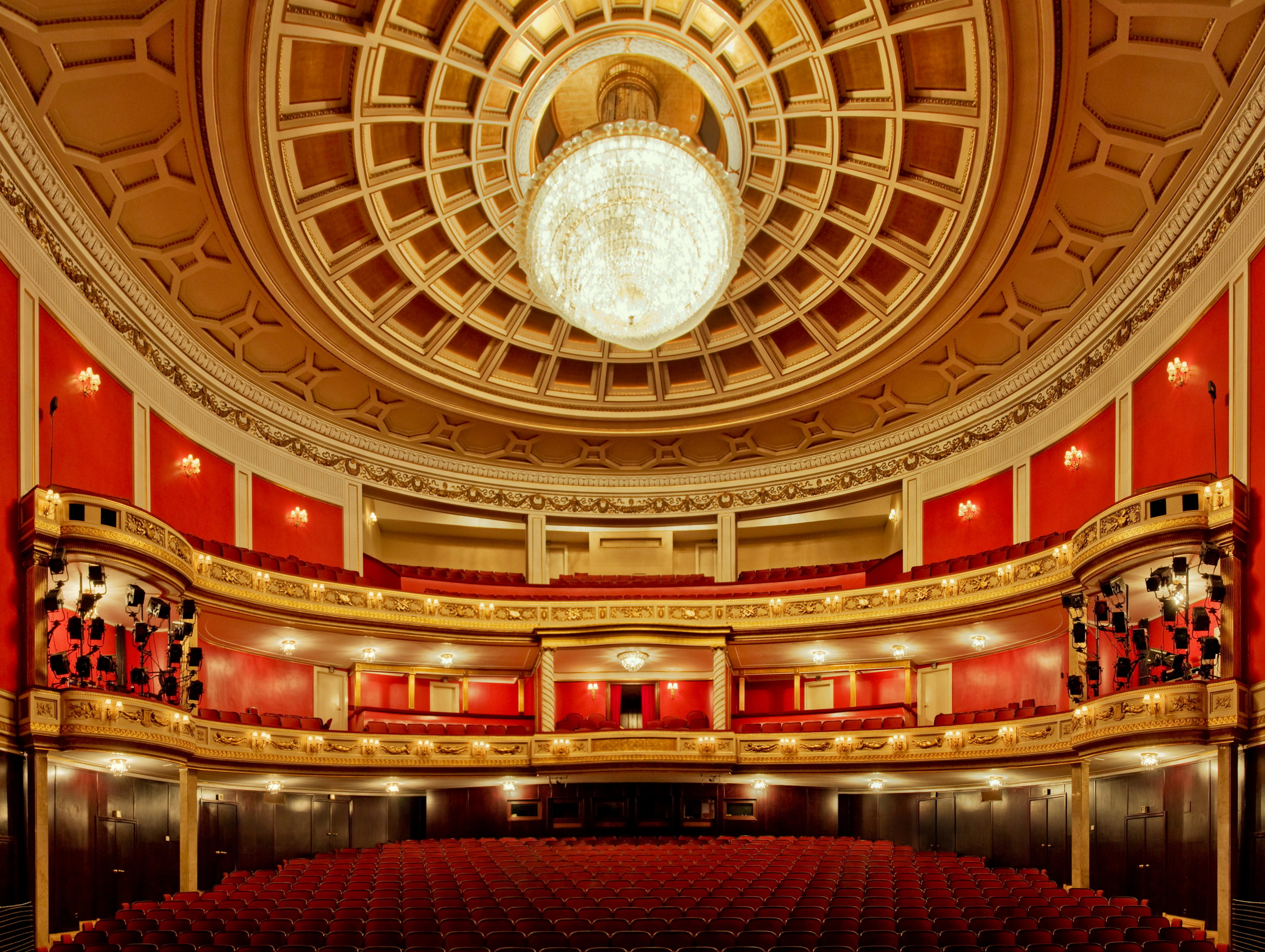
The audience of Opera House.

Classical music events include the Henryk Wieniawski Violin Competition which is held every 5 years, and classical music concerts by the Poznań Philharmonic orchestra held each month in the Hall of the Adam Mickiewicz University, considered to be one of the best in terms of acoustics in Poland. Especially popular are concerts by the Poznań Nightingales.

Poznań became one of Poland's main centres of hip-hop and rap music in the 90s. Most rappers are supporters of, or otherwise linked to, Lech Poznań; the club features heavily in their music. Musician Peja, an ardent supporter of the club since his youth, was active in the hooligan scene in the 90s. Evtis, Ascetoholix, Bzyk and DJ Decks are also prominent fans of the club. Music fans have produced recorded and released two rap CD's called Definicja Kibol and Definicja Kibol 2 as compilation of various artists. Other rappers include duo Pięć Dwa, Słoń, Paluch, Donguralesko and Nagły Atak Spawacza.

Other contemporary notable local musicians include Adam Nowak, the co-founder and leader of the band Raz, Dwa, Trzy; pop singer Sylwia Grzeszczak; rock band Pidżama Porno; and DJ duo Kalwi & Remi.

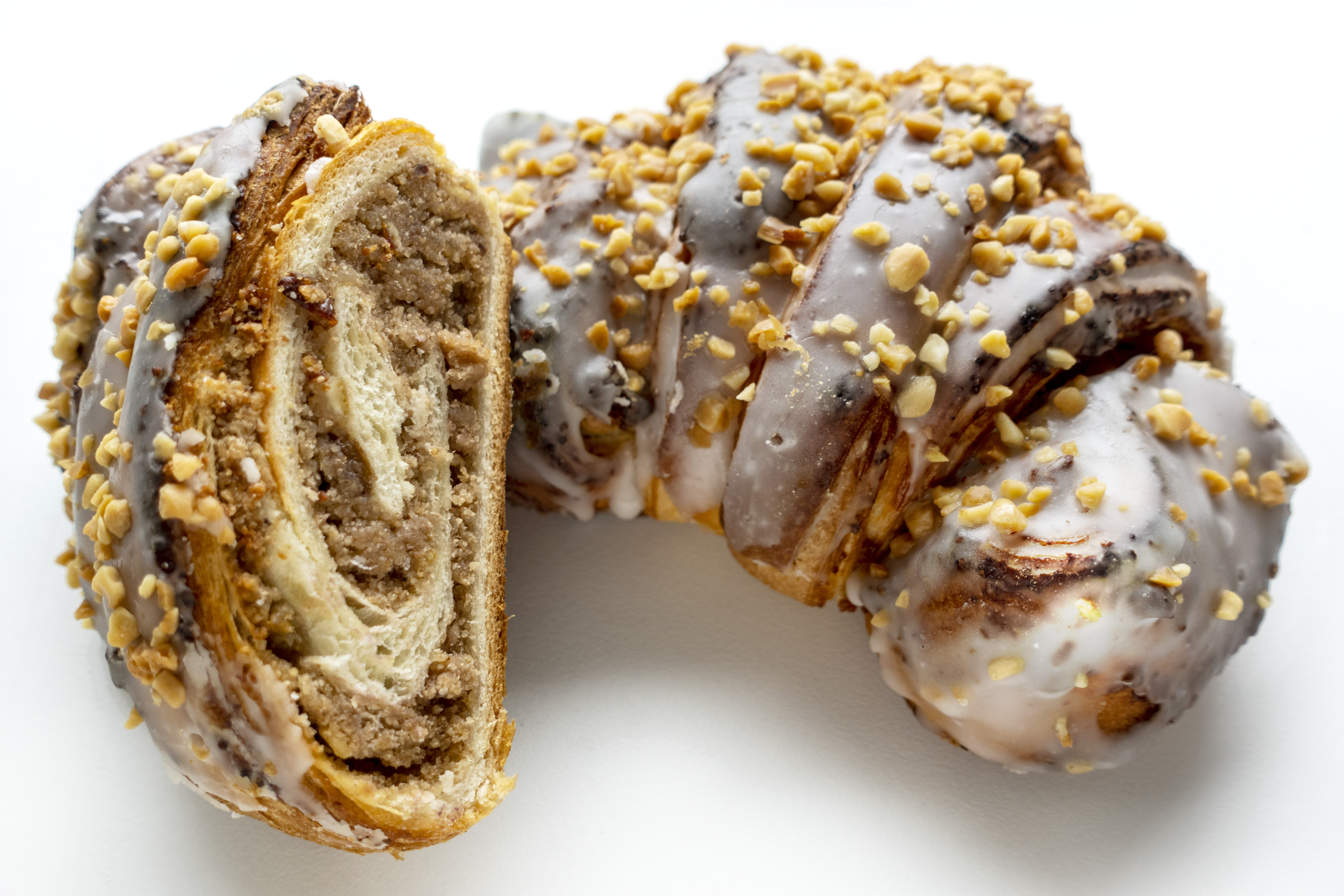
St. Martin's croissant.

Every year on 11 November, city residents celebrate the Day of St. Martin. A procession of horses, with Saint Martin at its head, parades along Saint Martin Street (ulica Święty Marcin), in front of the Imperial Castle. The renowned St. Martin's Croissant, a regional product of Poznań, are widely sold during the festivities.

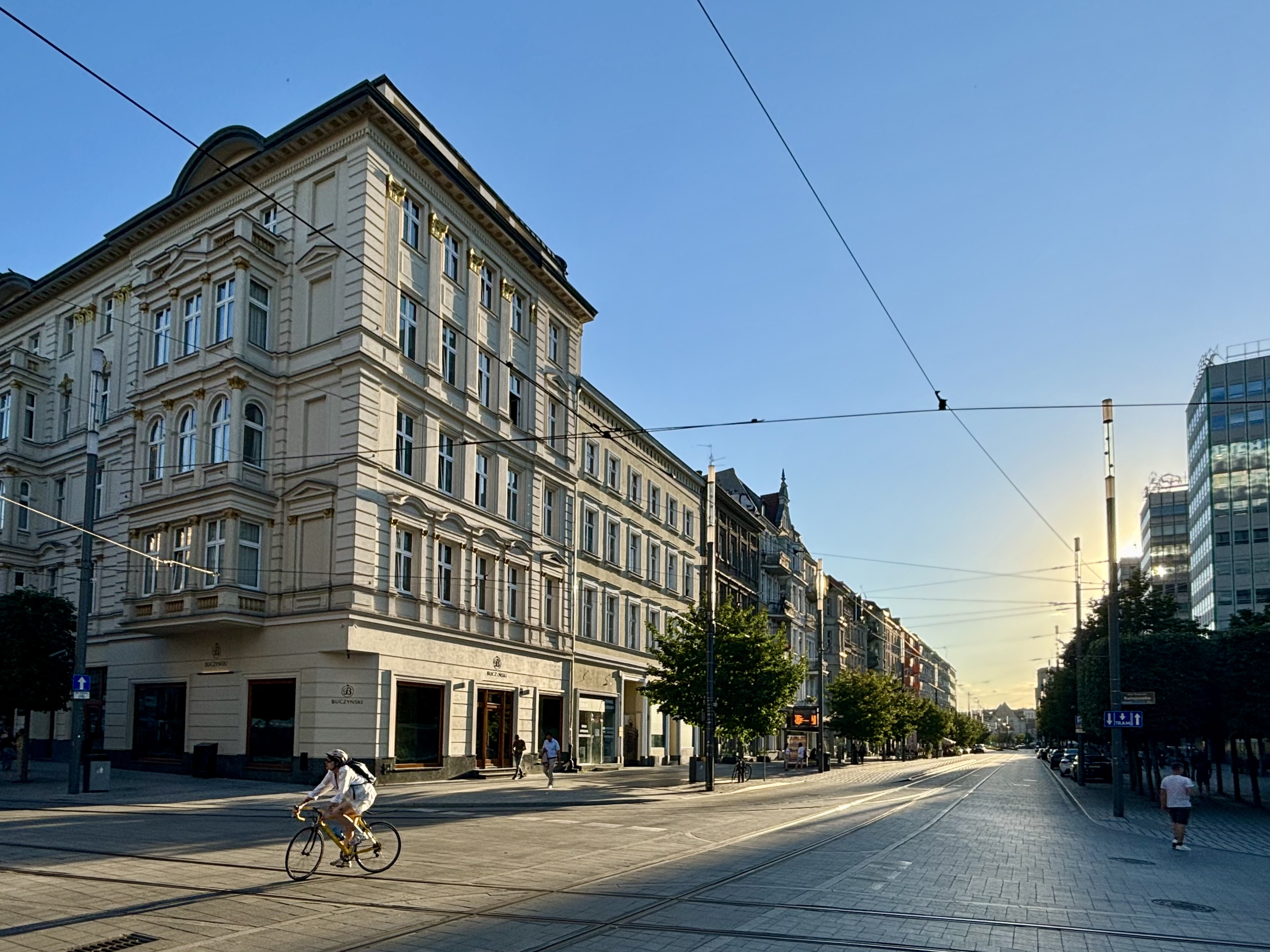
Święty Marcin – the street where the annual parade takes place.

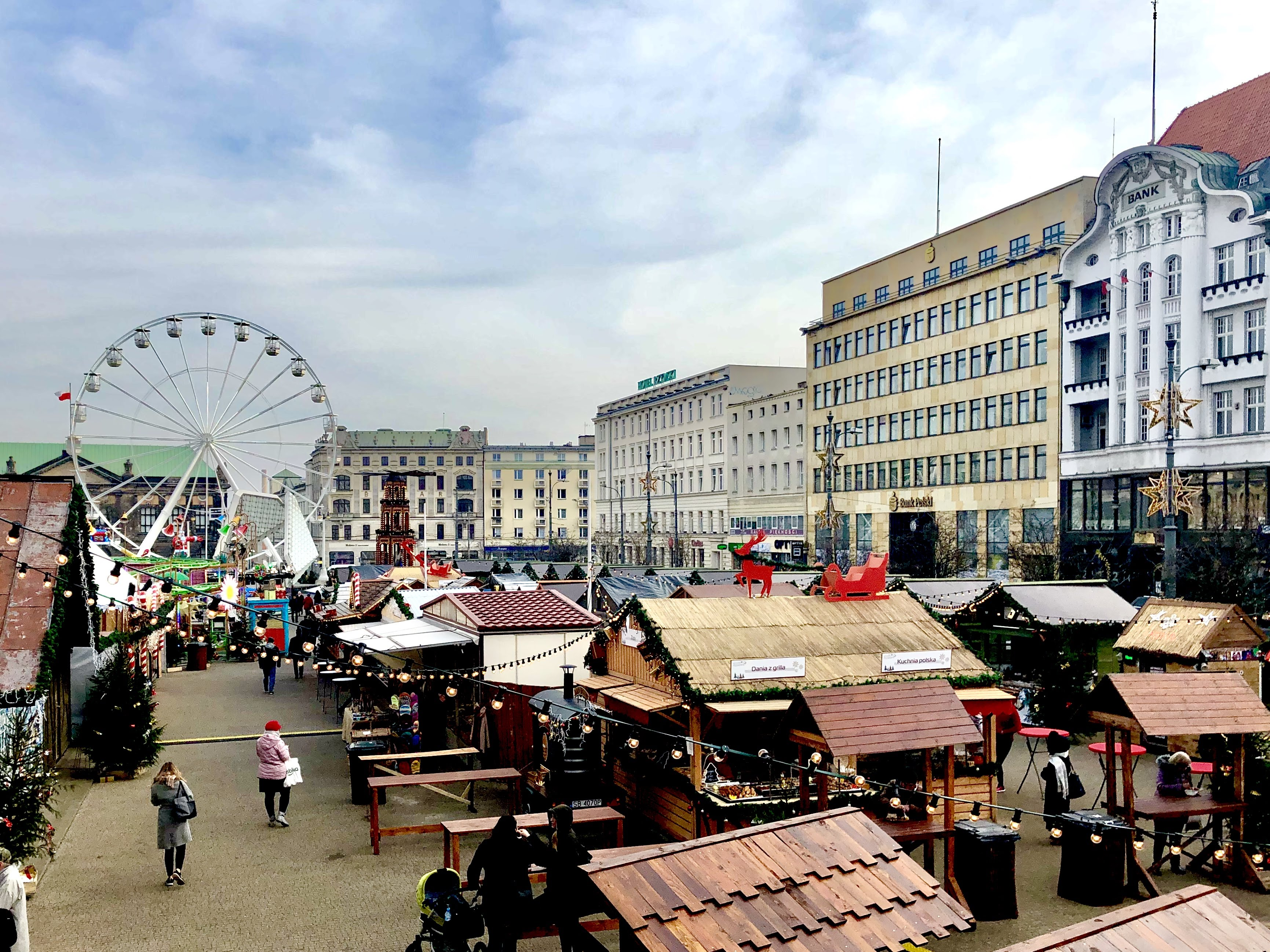
Christmas market at Wolności Square

Since the year 2000, Poznań has hosted Betlejem Poznańskie a cultural and entertainment event associated with the Advent season and Christmas. The event begins with the onset of Advent and concludes on 23 December. The central attraction is a live nativity scene featuring real animals, accompanied by a large stage where musical concerts, competitions, and various artistic and entertainment activities take place. Surrounding the nativity scene are numerous stalls offering handcrafted goods, regional products, traditional foods, mulled wine, and hot meals. The ambiance is reminiscent of German Christmas markets, known as Weihnachtsmarkte. In addition to the permanent attractions, Betlejem Poznańskie includes recurring events such as carol singing reviews, the election of the Poznań Gwiazdor (a fictional character who distributes gifts on Christmas Eve, appearing in Greater Poland's tradition), art workshops, city games, and more.

A highlight is the International Ice Sculpture Festival, held annually since 2006. The event also features the Betlejemskie Światło Pokoju (Bethlehem Light of Peace) brought from the Church of the Nativity in Bethlehem. During this time, city officials, the consular corps, and rectors of Poznań's universities exchange festive greetings.

An important cultural event in Poznań is the annual Malta Festival, which takes place at many city venues, usually in late June and early July. It hosts mainly modern experimental off-theatre performances often taking place on squares and other public spaces. It also includes cinema, visual, music and dancing events. Poznań also stages the Ale Kino! International Young Audience Film Festival in December, and Off Cinema festival of independent films. Other festivals: Animator (animated film festival), Ethno Port festival of traditional world's ethnic music, Maski Theater Festival, Dance International Workshops by Polish Dance Theater, Made in Chicago (jazz festival), Festival of Ice Sculpture, Science and Art Festival, Tzadik (Jewish music festival), and Meditations Biennale (modern art).

Poznań has several museums as well as cinemas, including multiplexes and art-house institutions. The Rozbrat social centre, a squatted former factory in Jeżyce, serves as a home for independent and open-minded culture. It hosts frequent gigs, an anarchist library, vernissages, exhibitions, an annual birthday festival in October, poetry evenings and graffiti festivals. The city centre has many clubs, pubs and coffee houses.

A popular venue is Malta, a park with an artificial lake situated in its centre. On one south bank of the lake there are ski and sleigh slopes of Malta Ski centre, and on the opposite bank a large complex of Termy Maltańskie swimming pools.

Poznań Zoological Garden has two facilities. The Old Zoo is one of the oldest in Poland, established in 1874 just west of the city centre. The large 116-hectare (290-acre) New Zoo was opened to the public in 1974, becoming second largest in Poland in terms of area. It is located on a hilly forest area with six large ponds at the eastern city's wedge of greenery, beyond the Malta lake. There is a dedicated and adored by children Maltanka mini-railway, that starts the route near the Śródka roundabout.

Places of interest

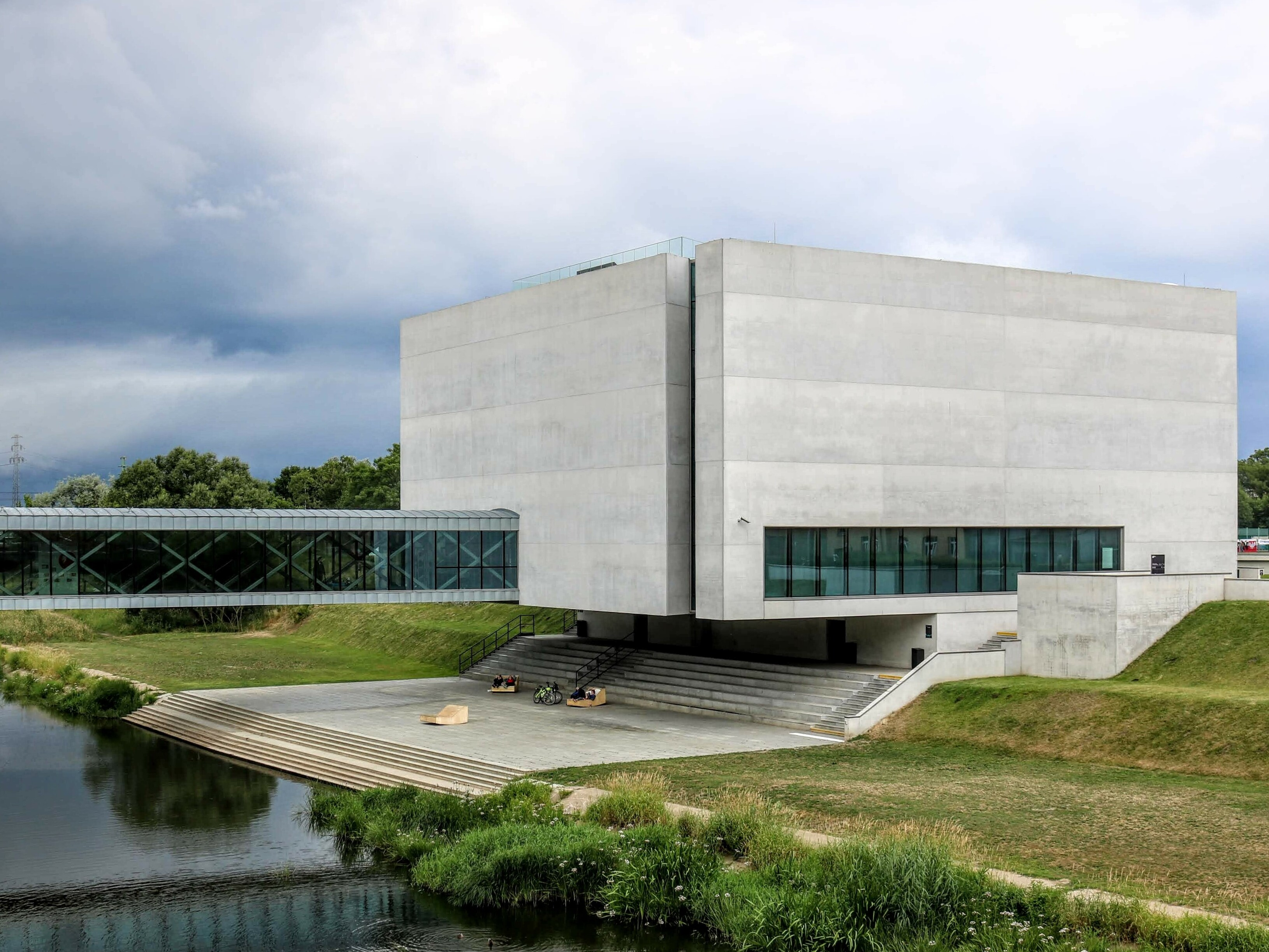
Śródka's Porta Posnania with steel-glass footbridge over small right branch of Warta.

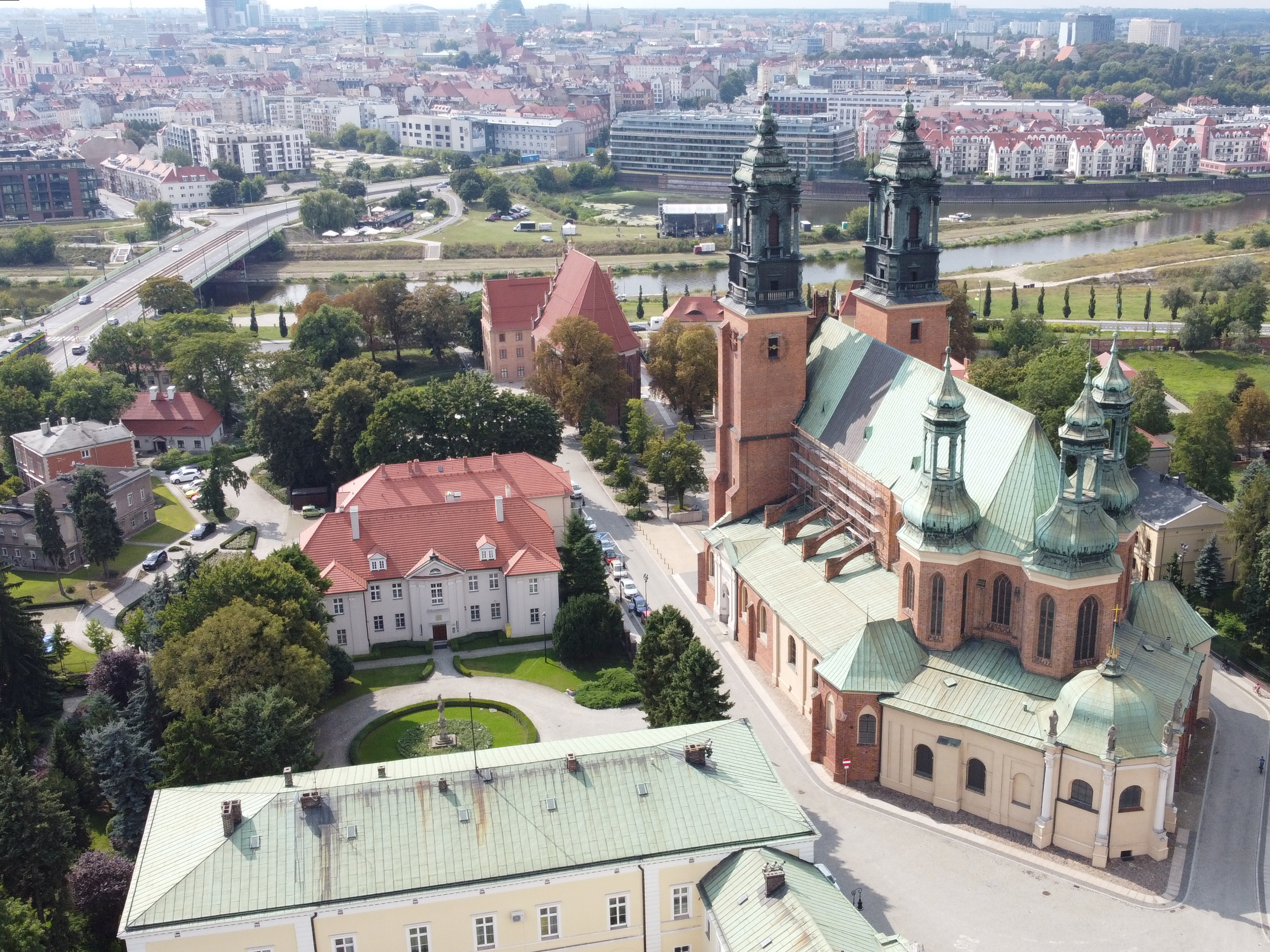
Ostrów Tumski, an island on the Warta River, is one of the earliest settlement centres on Polish lands.

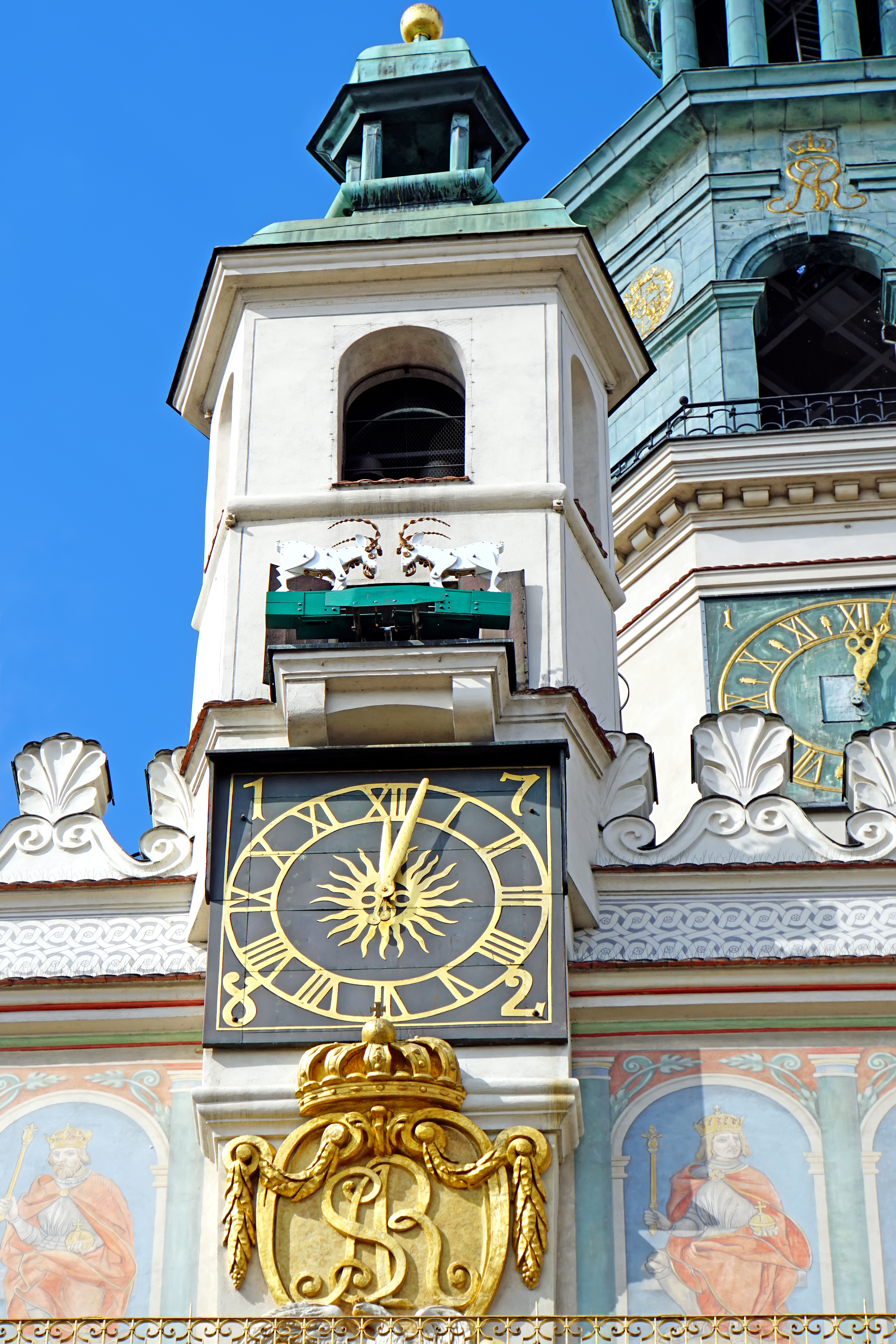
Old Market Square – Poznań Goats and the Ratusz Clock Tower.

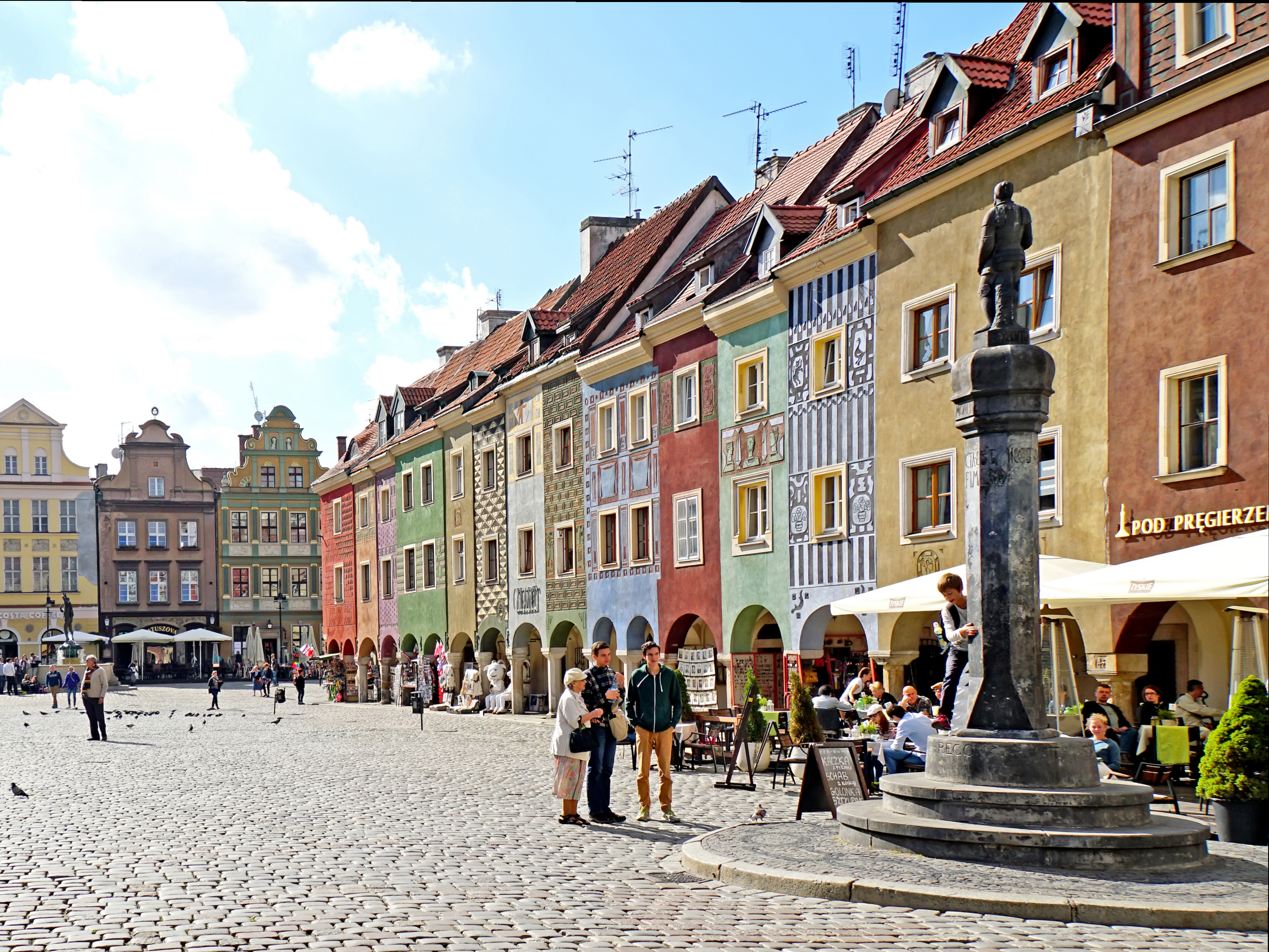
Old Market Square – merchant houses, originally 16th century's herring stalls.

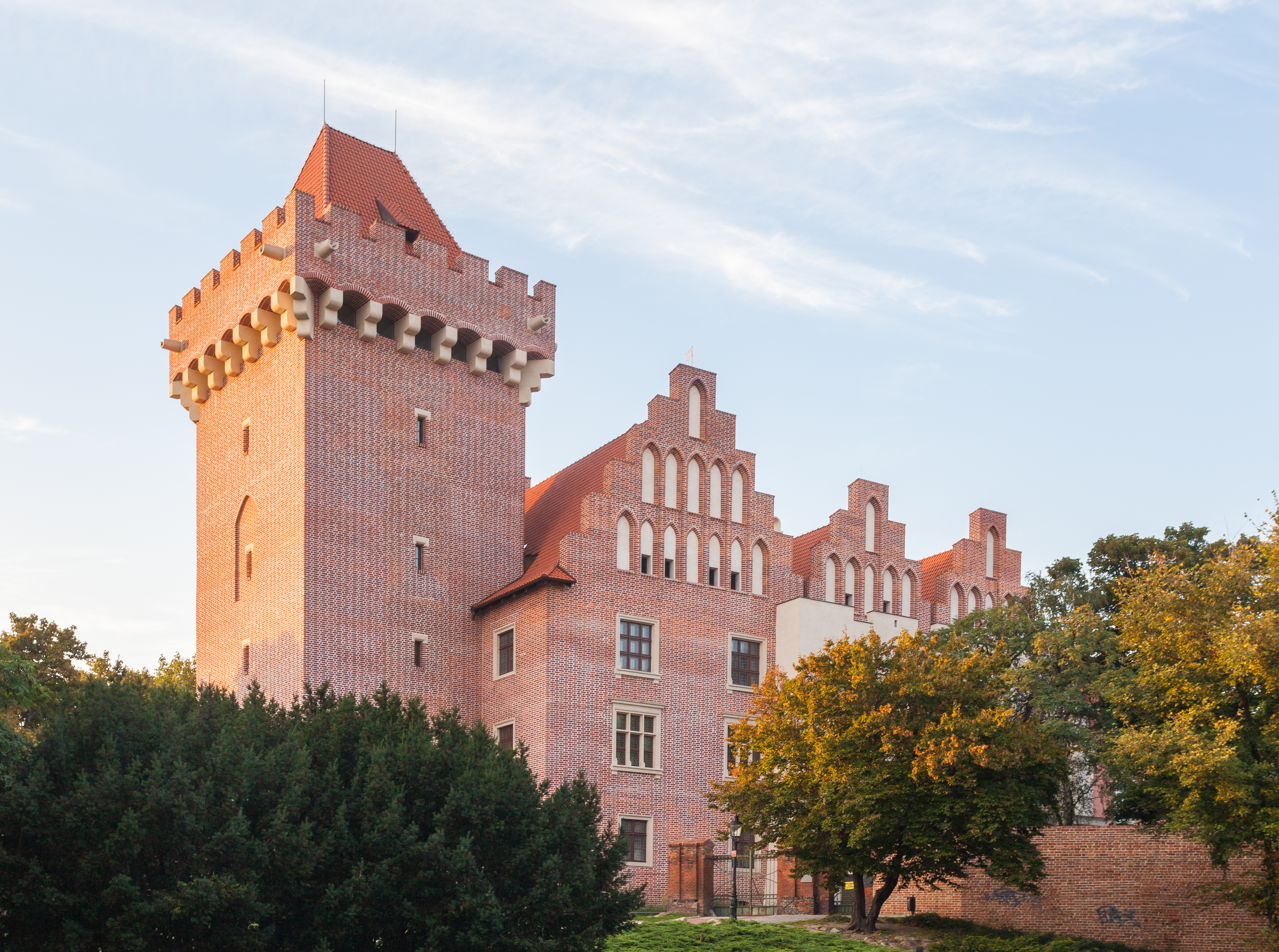
Reconstructed Royal Castle of Duke Przemysł I of Greater Poland

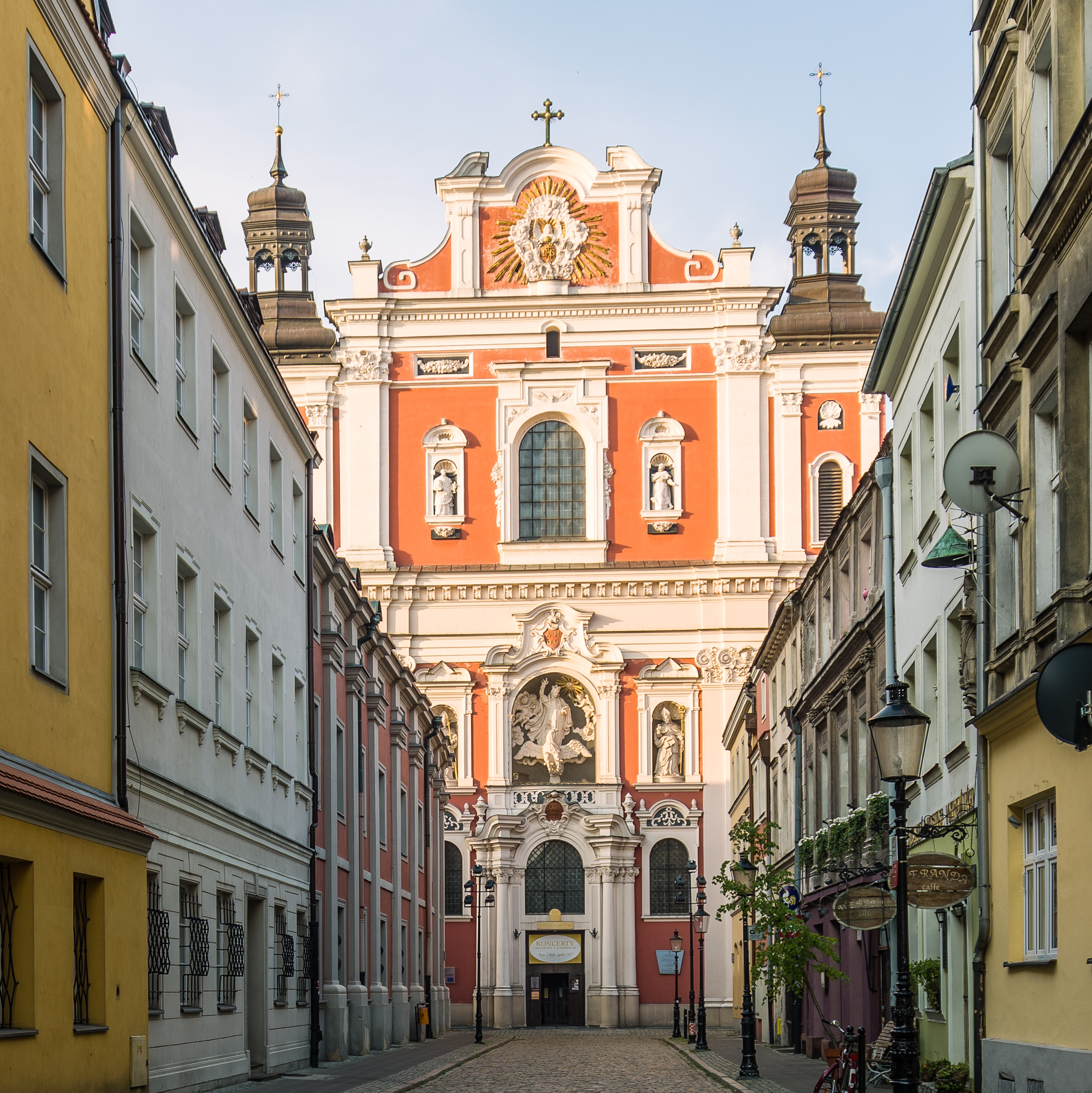
Façade of Fara with a figure of St. Ignatius of Loyola.

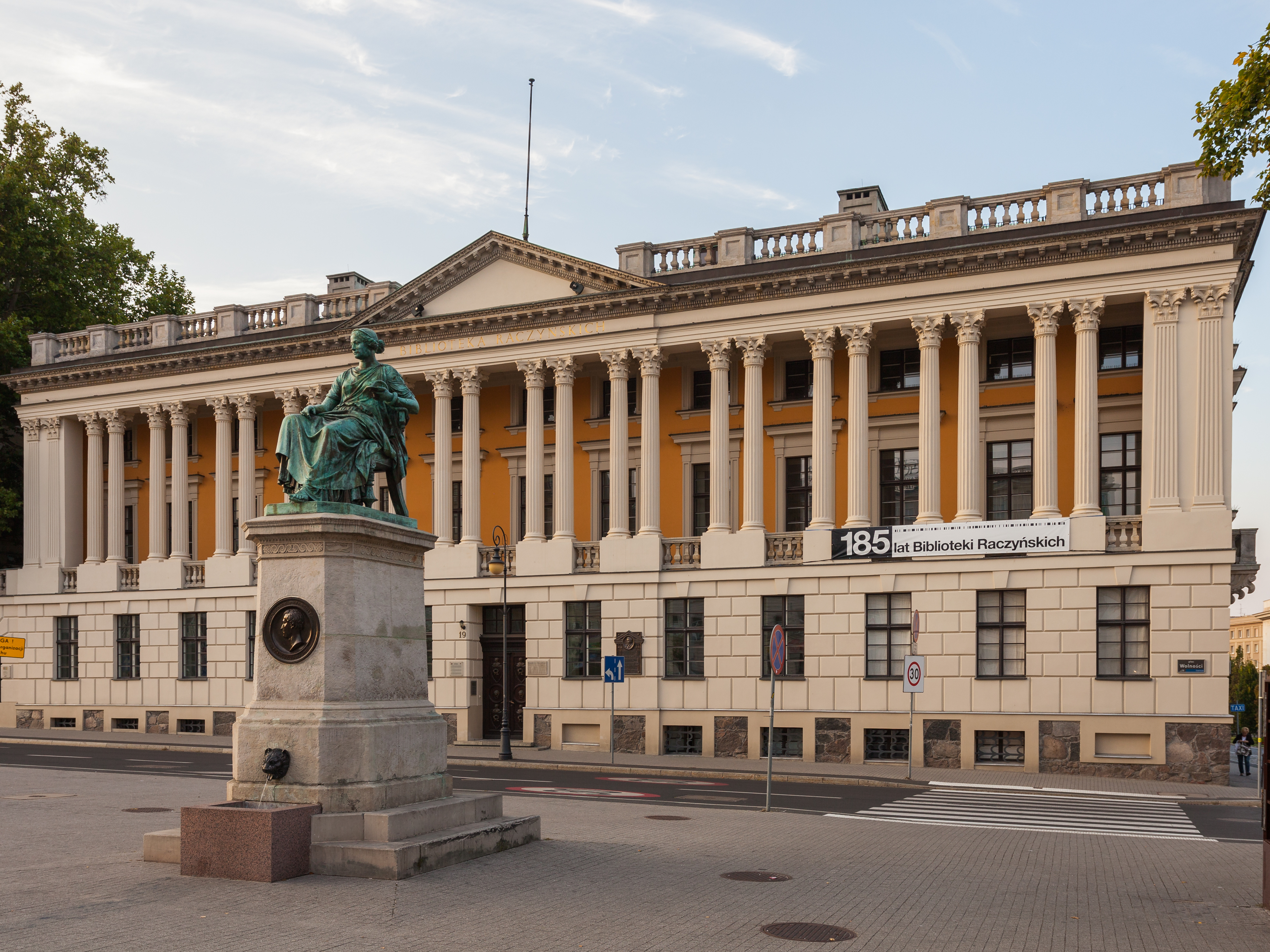
Raczyński Library, erected in 1822–1828 with the financial support of Edward Raczyński Foundation

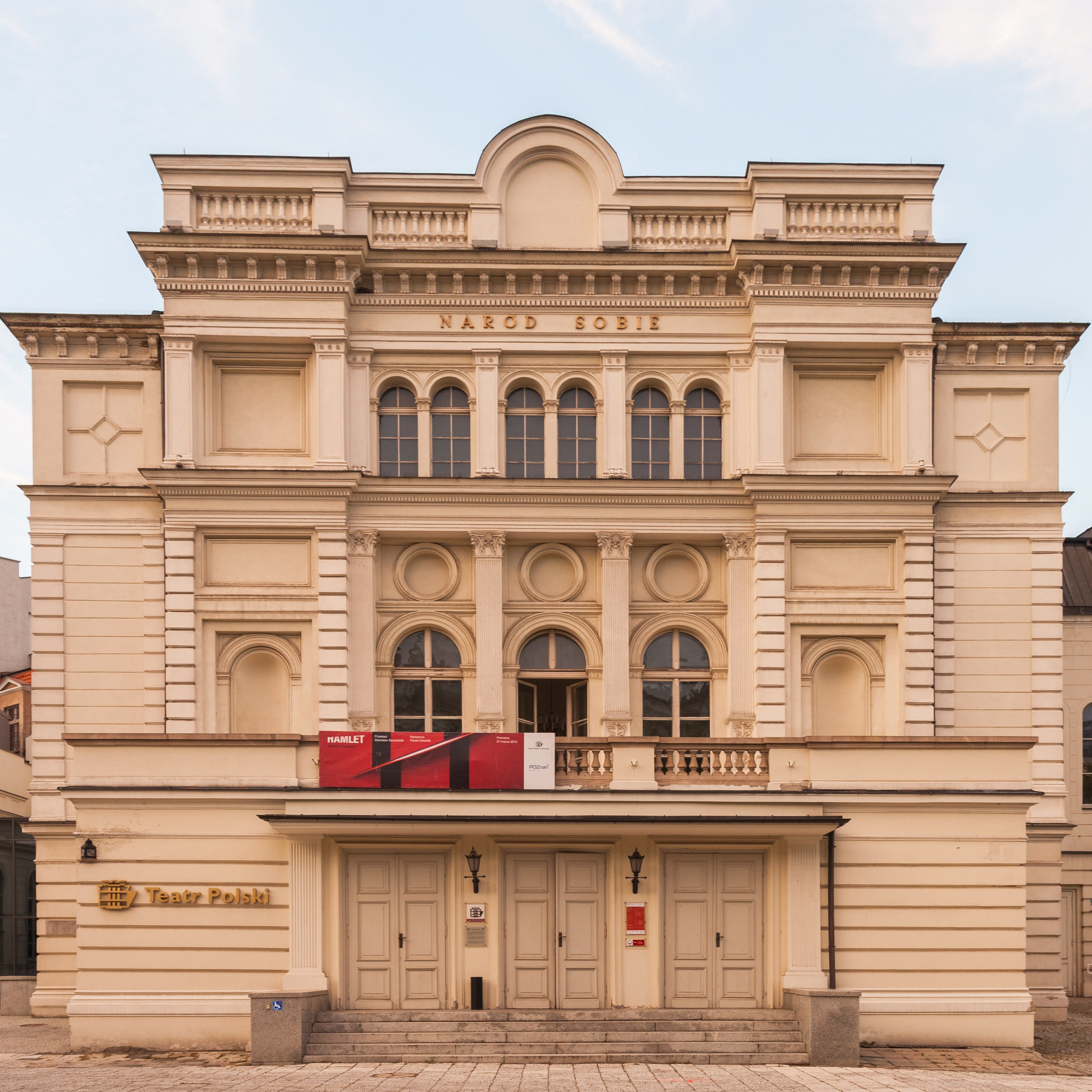
Polish Theatre with the inscription "The Nation Unto Itself" (Polish: Naród sobie)

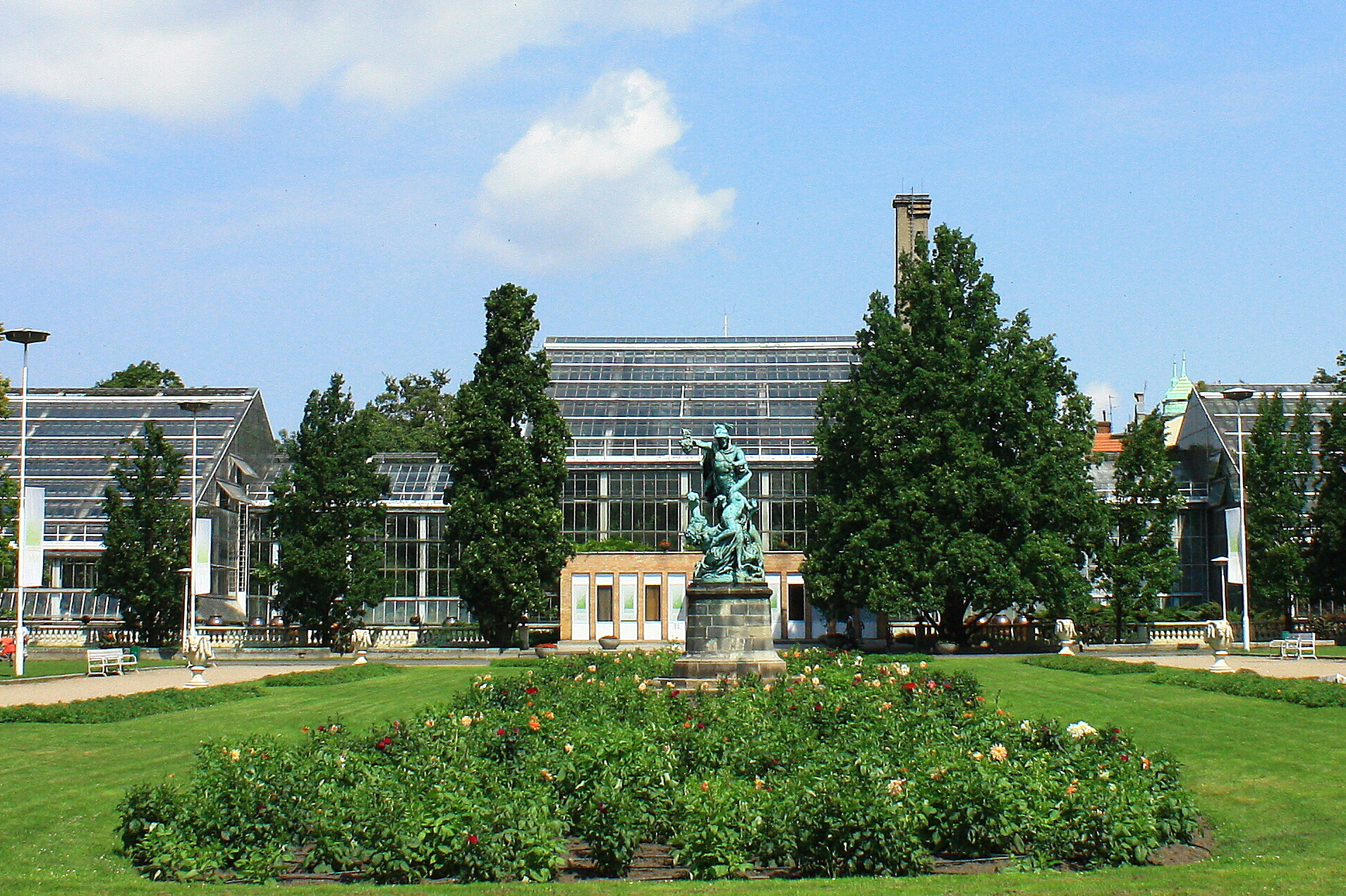
Poznań has many parks, large botanical garden and palm house.

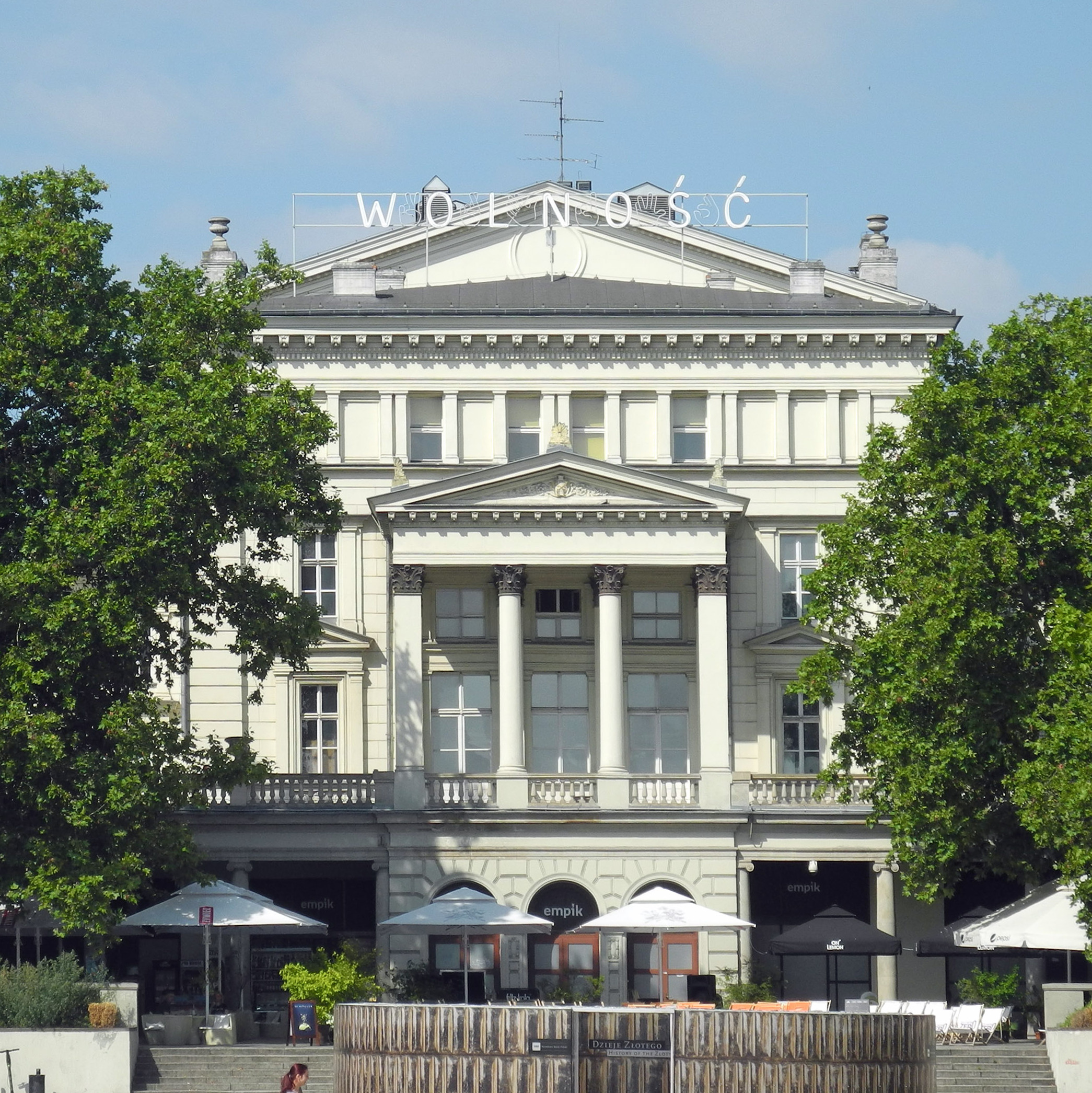
Arkadia building hosted, among others, Ferenc Liszt and Niccolò Paganini.

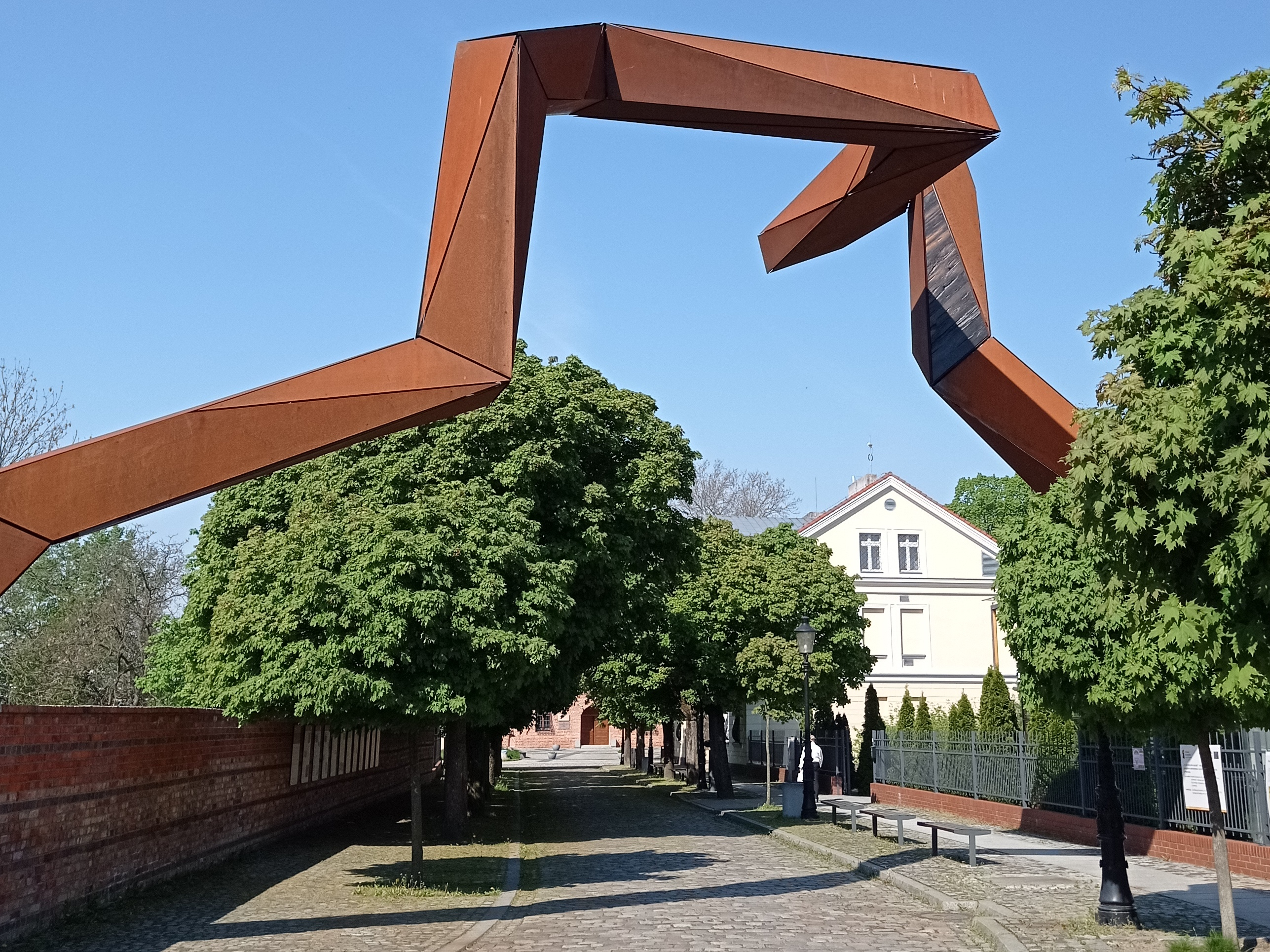
Genius loci archaeological reserve, installation representing a rampart of Mieszko I's gord, located here in the 10th century.

== Economy ==
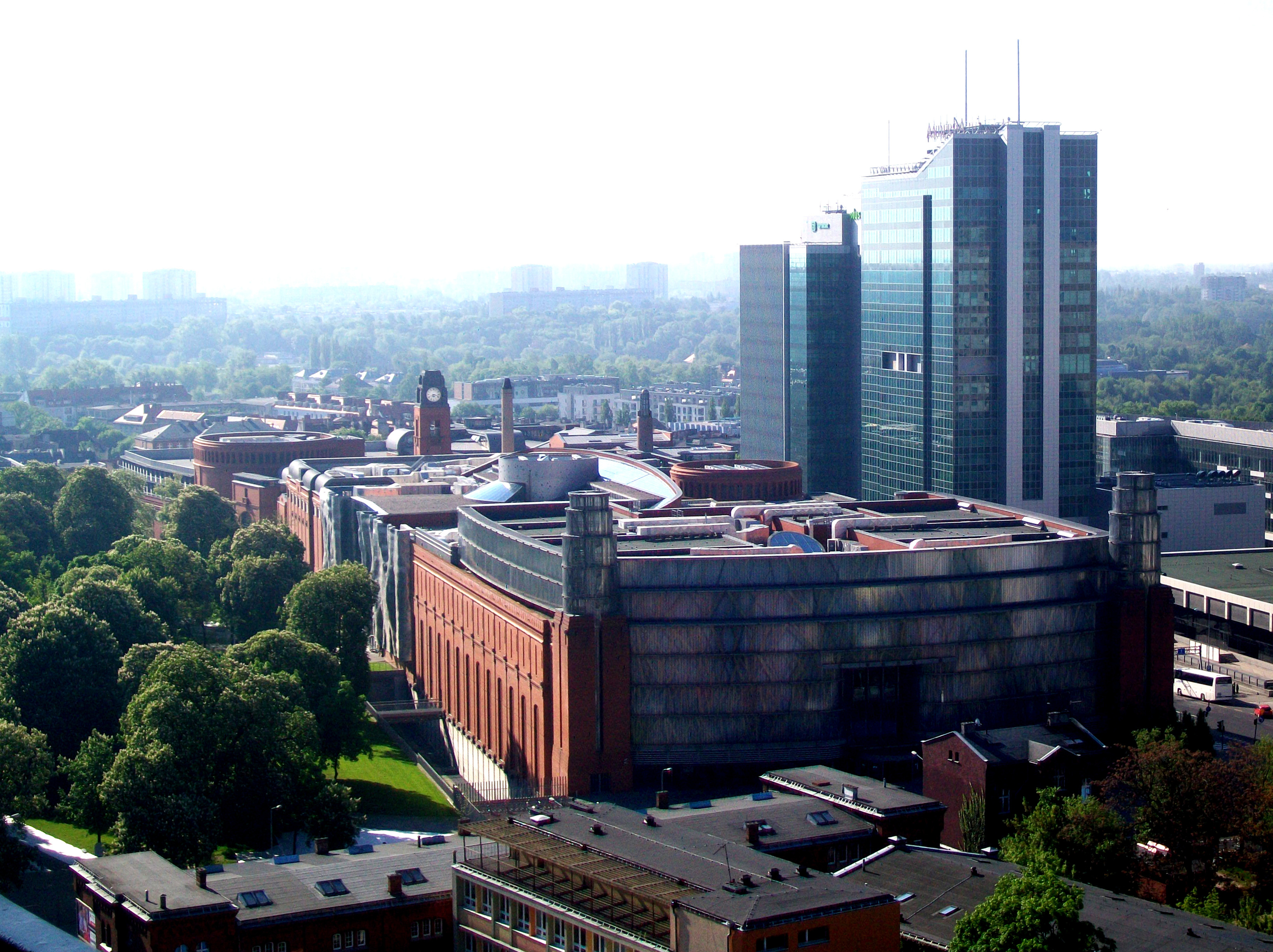
A view of Stary Browar, Poznań Financial Centre, and Andersia Tower from Collegium Altum of University of Economics.

Poznań has been an important trade centre since the Middle Ages. Starting in the 19th century, local heavy industry began to grow. Several major factories were built, including the Hipolit Cegielski's steel mill and railway factory, popularly called Ceglorz.

Nowadays, Poznań is one of the major trade centres in Poland. It is regarded as the second most prosperous city in Poland after its capital Warsaw. The city of Poznań produced PLN 31.8 billion of Poland's gross domestic product in 2006.

Many European companies have established their Polish headquarters in Poznań or in nearby towns such as Tarnowo Podgórne and Swarzędz. Most foreign investors are German (36%) and Dutch companies (14%). The best known examples of corporation who have their headquarters in Poznań and the surrounding areas are that of Volkswagen, GlaxoSmithKline, Amazon, Bridgestone, Beiersdorf, Raben Group (near Kórnik) and Kuehne + Nagel (near Gądki). There are also several shared services centres, and IT branch offices. Investors are mostly from the food processing, furniture, automotive and transport and logistics industries. Foreign companies are primarily attracted by relatively low labour costs, good road and railway network, good vocational skills of workers, and relatively liberal employment laws.

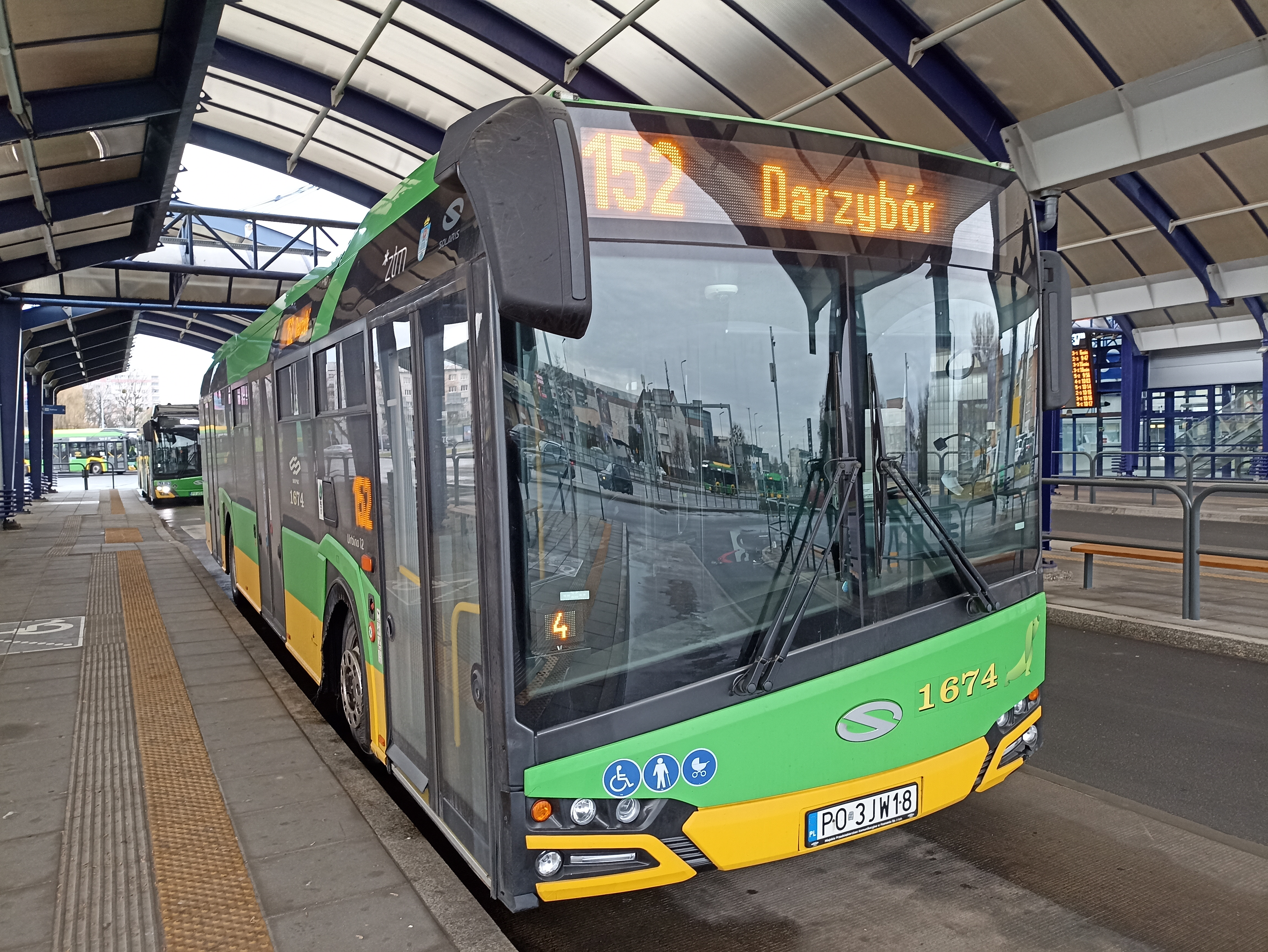
Solaris buses and trolleybuses can be seen in many European cities (Poznań pictured)

Some of the best-known major corporations founded and still based in Poznań and the city's metropolitan area include Allegro – owner of the Poland's biggest e-commerce site, H. Cegielski-Poznań SA – a historic manufacturer, Solaris Bus & Coach – a modern bus and coach maker based in Bolechowo, and Enea S.A. – one of the country's biggest energy firms. Kompania Piwowarska based in Poznań produces some of Poland's best known beers, and includes not only the local Lech Brewery's products but also Tyskie from Tychy and Dojlidy Brewery from Białystok among many others.

In 2008, three Poznań students founded Netguru, a software development and digital consultancy company. It grew fast to employ about 600 people in 2019.

Stary Browar, the centre of commerce and art opened in 2003, won several awards for its architecture. Other notable shopping centres include Posnania, the biggest commerce facility in Greater Poland, Galeria Malta, and the shops at the Hotel Bazar – a historical hotel and commercial centre in the Old Town.

Year	2004	2005	2006	2007	2008	2009	2010	2011	2012	2013	2014	2015	2016	2017	2018	2019	2020	2021
Unemployment rate in %	6.7	6.2	5.0	2.9	1.8	3.2	3.6	3.6	4.2	4.2	3.1	2.4	1.9	1.4	1.2	1.1	2.0	1.6

== Population ==
Poznań population pyramid in 2021

In 1600, approximately 20,000 inhabitants resided in the whole Poznań conurbation. By 1732 the population had dropped to 4,000 due to wars, floods and plague. Historically, its growth rate was high throughout the 19th and 20th centuries; in the year 1900 approximately 110,000 people were registered as residents and by 1939 there was already 274,155 people. The population of Poznań has declined steadily since 1990, when it reached a maximum of 590,101. This phenomenon, which also affected other European cities, is caused in part by the growth of satellite suburbs at the expense of the downtown region within the city proper. As of 31 December 2025, Poznań had 534,239 inhabitants, making it the fifth most populous city in Poland, with a population density of 2,040 people per square kilometre (5,300 people/mi^{2}). The metropolitan area had a population of about 1,000,000 people.

Contemporary Poznań has one of the highest concentration of foreigners in Poland alongside Warsaw and Wrocław; a significant majority are migrant workers from Ukraine; others came from Italy, Spain, Belarus, Russia and Serbia. No exact statistic exists on the number of temporary residents from abroad. Many are students studying at Poznań's schools and institutions of higher learning. According to the city administration, on 31 May 2025 there were 12,114 foreign nationals registered in Poznań, including 5,780 citizens of Ukraine and 3,041 citizens of Belarus (see Belarusians in Poznań).

Population of Poznań

Year	Pop.	±% p.a.
1250	2,500	—
1350	4,000	+0.47%
1600	20,000	+0.65%
1700	12,000	−0.51%
1732	4,000	−3.37%
1800	18,779	+2.30%
1850	43,000	+1.67%

Year	Pop.	±% p.a.
1900	110,000	+1.90%
1939	274,155	+2.37%
1944	323,747	+3.38%
1946	267,978	−9.02%
1950	320,670	+4.59%
1960	408,132	+2.44%
1970	471,367	+1.45%

Year	Pop.	±% p.a.
1978	537,149	+1.65%
1988	587,971	+0.91%
2002	578,886	−0.11%
2011	554,696	−0.47%
2021	546,859	−0.14%

Population size may be affected by changes in administrative divisions.

== Education and science ==
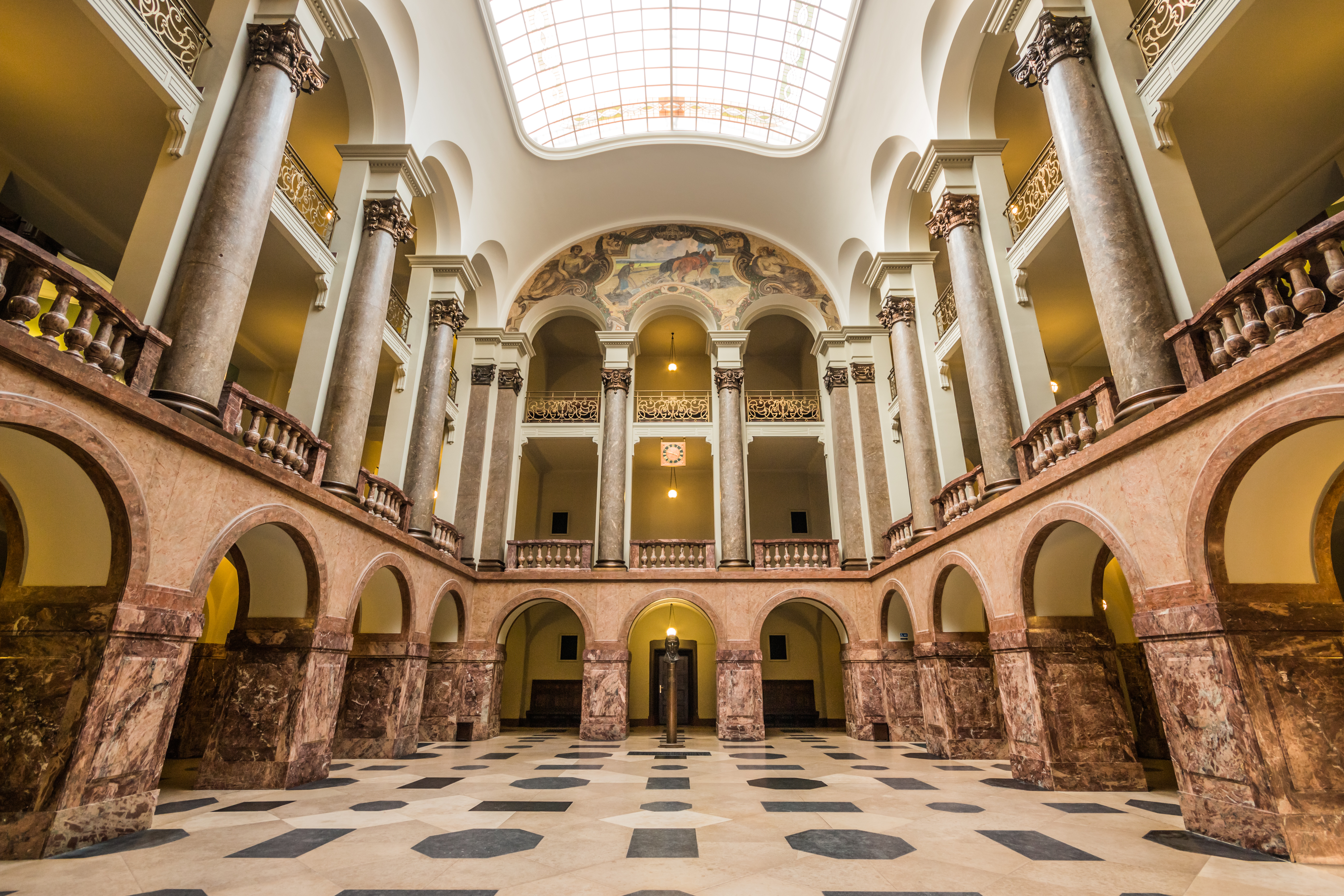
The hall of Collegium Maius of Adam Mickiewicz University

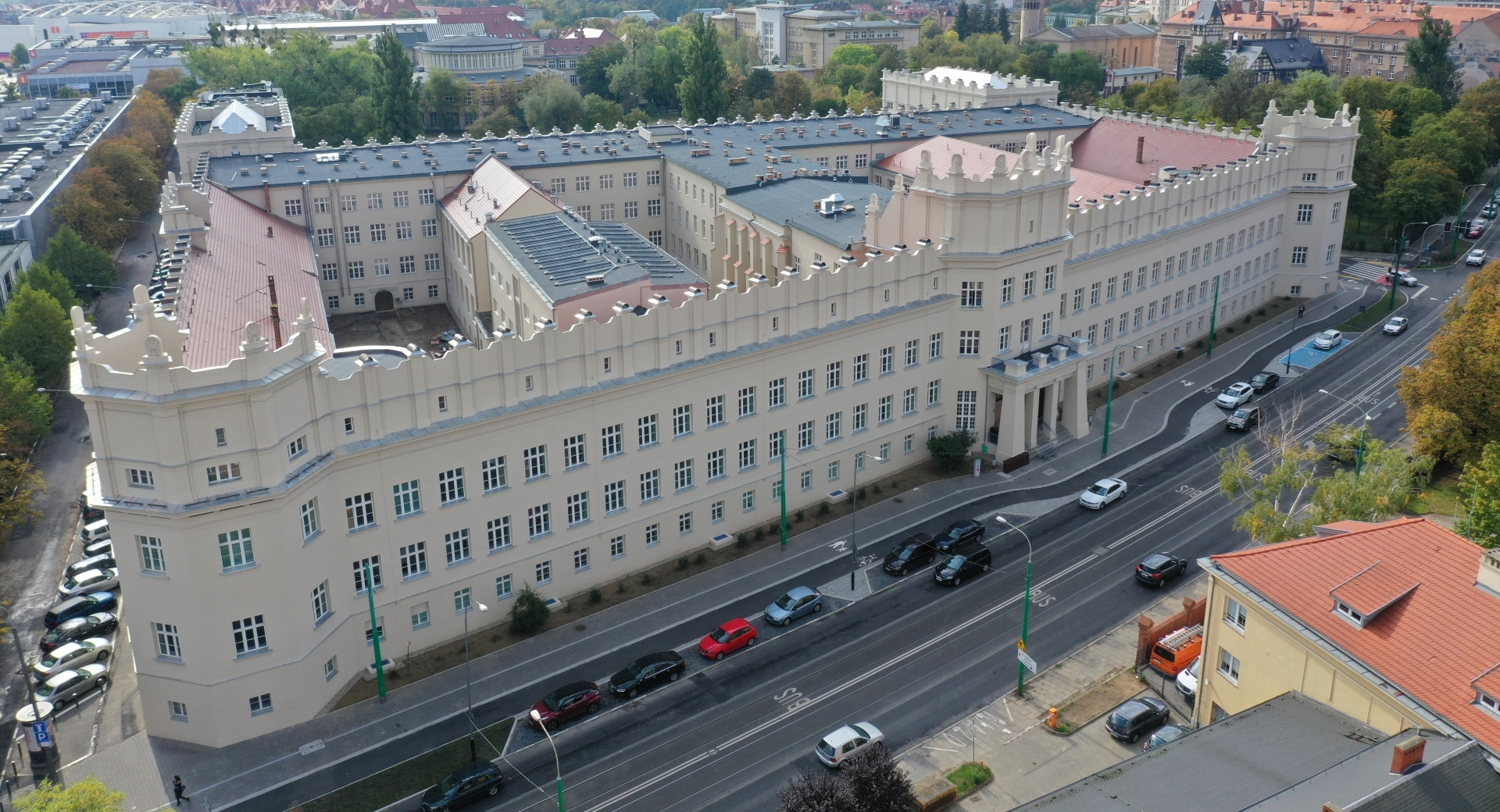
Collegium Heliodori Święcicki simultaneously serves the UAM University and University of Medical Sciences.

Poznań is one of the four largest academic centres in Poland. The number of students in the city is about 140,000, which ranks it the third or fourth after Warsaw and Kraków and about equal to Wrocław in student population. Every one in four inhabitants of Poznań is a student. Since Poznań is smaller than Warsaw or Kraków still having a very large number of students it makes the city even more vibrant and dense academic hub than both former and current capital of Poland – Kraków and Warsaw respectively. Poznań with its almost 30 universities and colleges has the second richest educational offering in the country after Warsaw.

=== Public universities ===
The city has eight state-owned universities. Adam Mickiewicz University (UAM) is one of the most influential and biggest universities in Poland. Poznań University of Technology (PUT, PP in Polish) is one of the most influential and biggest technical universities in Poland.

- Adam Mickiewicz University
- Poznań University of Technology
- Poznań University of Economics and Business
- Poznań University of Medical Sciences
- University of Life Sciences in Poznań
- Poznań University School of Physical Education
- University of Fine Arts in Poznań
- Academy of Music in Poznań

The Adam Mickiewicz University is one of the three most important universities in Poland after University of Warsaw and University of Kraków. All three host a large number of international students and lead in scientist exchange, research grants and top publications. The University's Morasko Campus in northern Poznań comprises the Faculties of Biology, Physics, Mathematics, Chemistry, Political Sciences, and Geography. The campus infrastructure belongs to the most impressive among Polish universities. It is situated close to the Morasko meteorite nature reserve, one of the rare sites in Europe where a number of meteorites fell and some traces may be still seen.

Poznań University of Technology was ranked fifth among all universities in Poland, and third among Polish technical universities, in the 2018 international Scimago Institutions Ranking. In the 2019 Academic Ranking of World Universities, known also as the Shanghai Ranking, PUT was classified among the 500 best universities in the world in two disciplines, i.e. "Computer Science & Engineering" and "Mechanical Engineering". PUT was ranked third among all Polish universities in the 2019–20 Ministry of Science and Higher Education popularity ranking. Recent years have brought extensive development of university infrastructure at the "Warta campus", located on the right side of Warta river between Malta lake and Poznań city centre.

Higher education institutions in Poznań

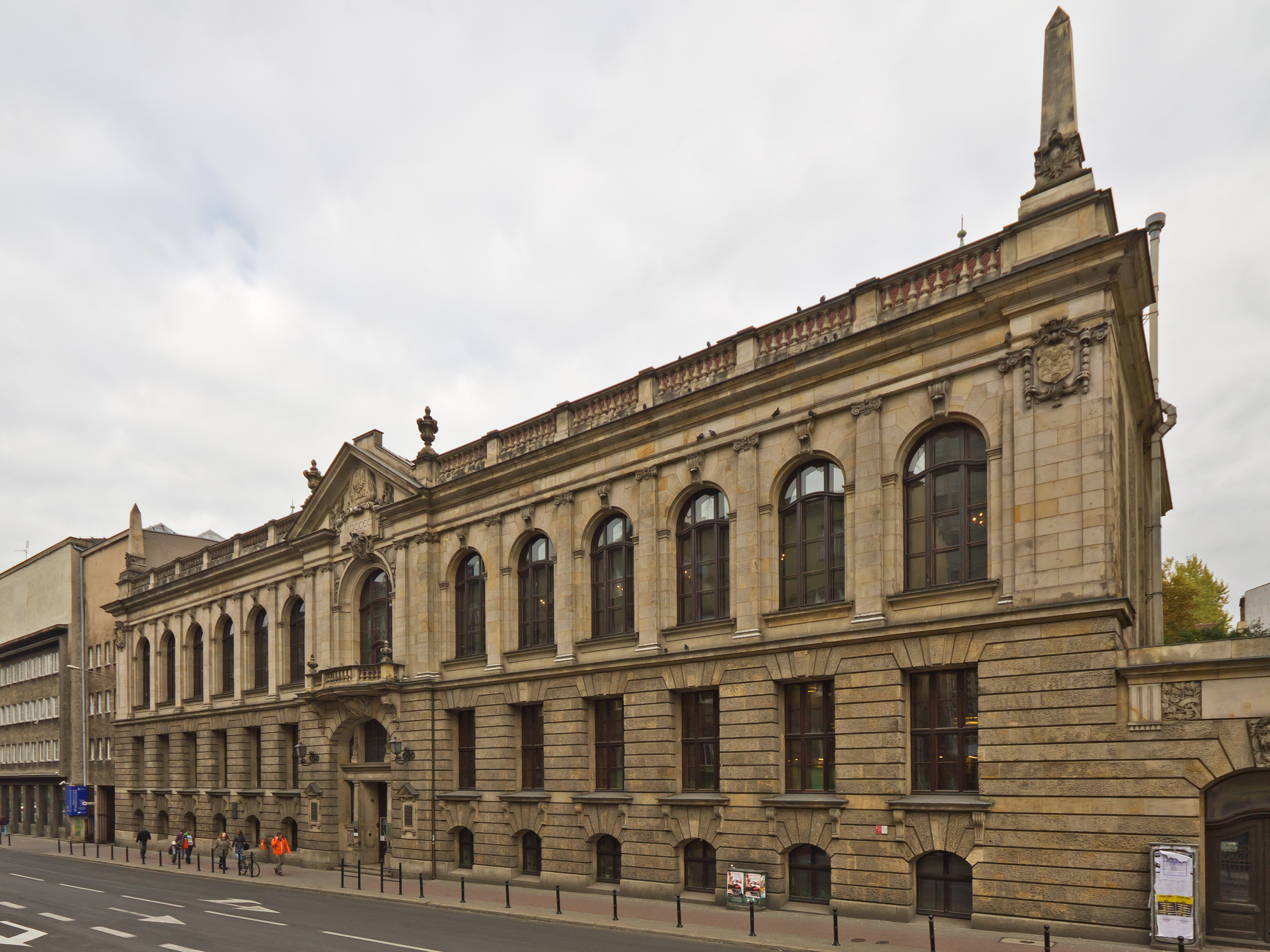
Adam Mickiewicz University – Library

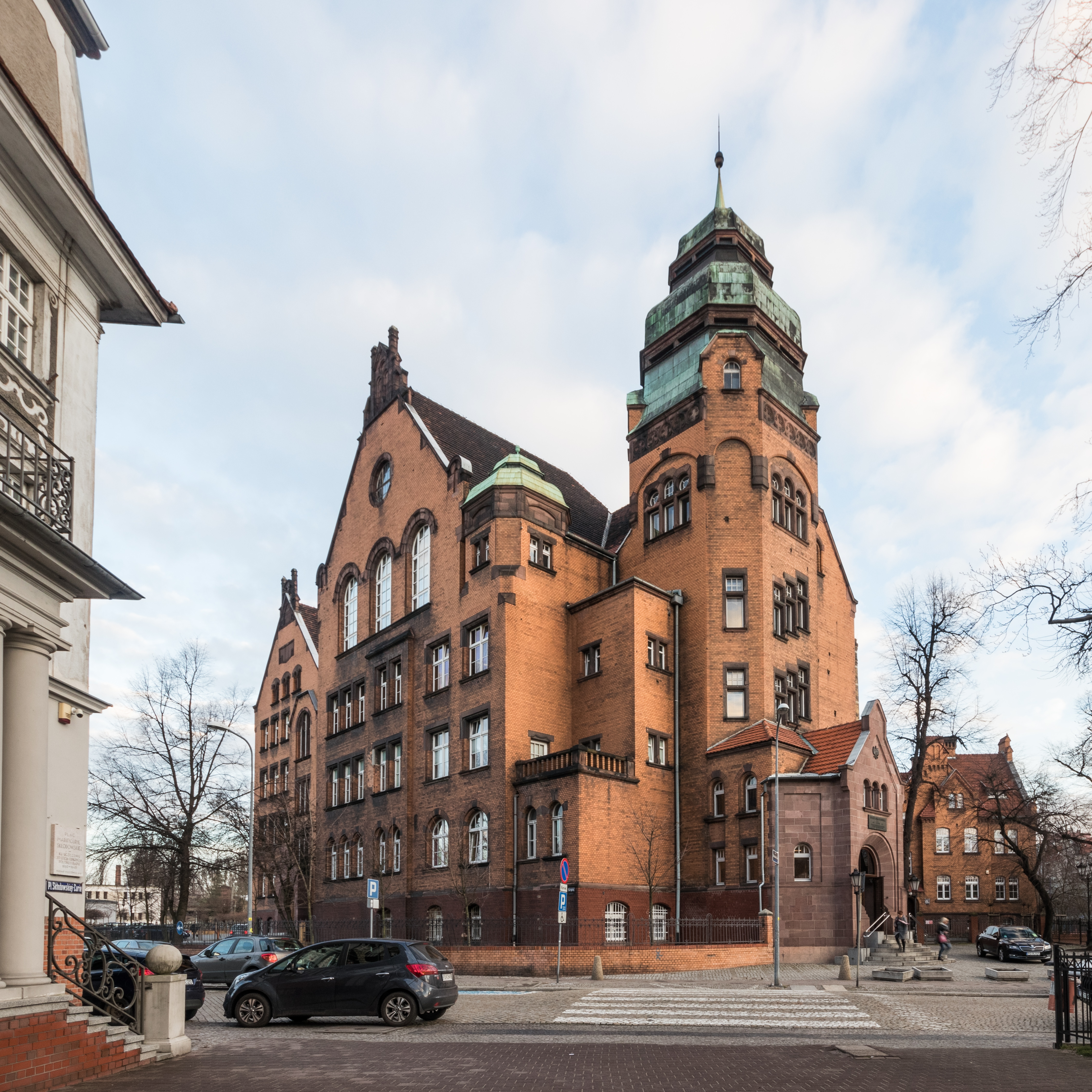
University of Technology

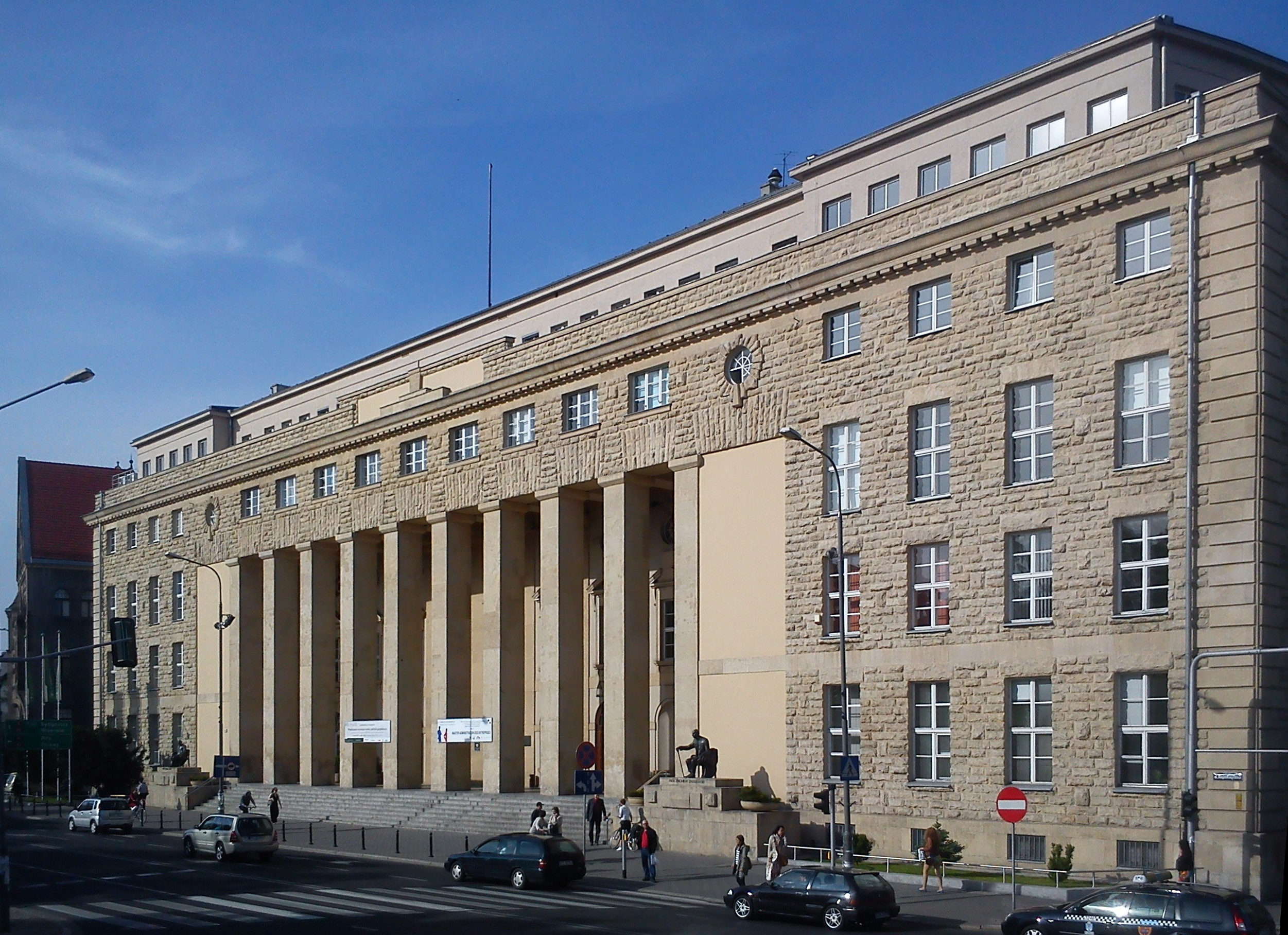
University of Economics

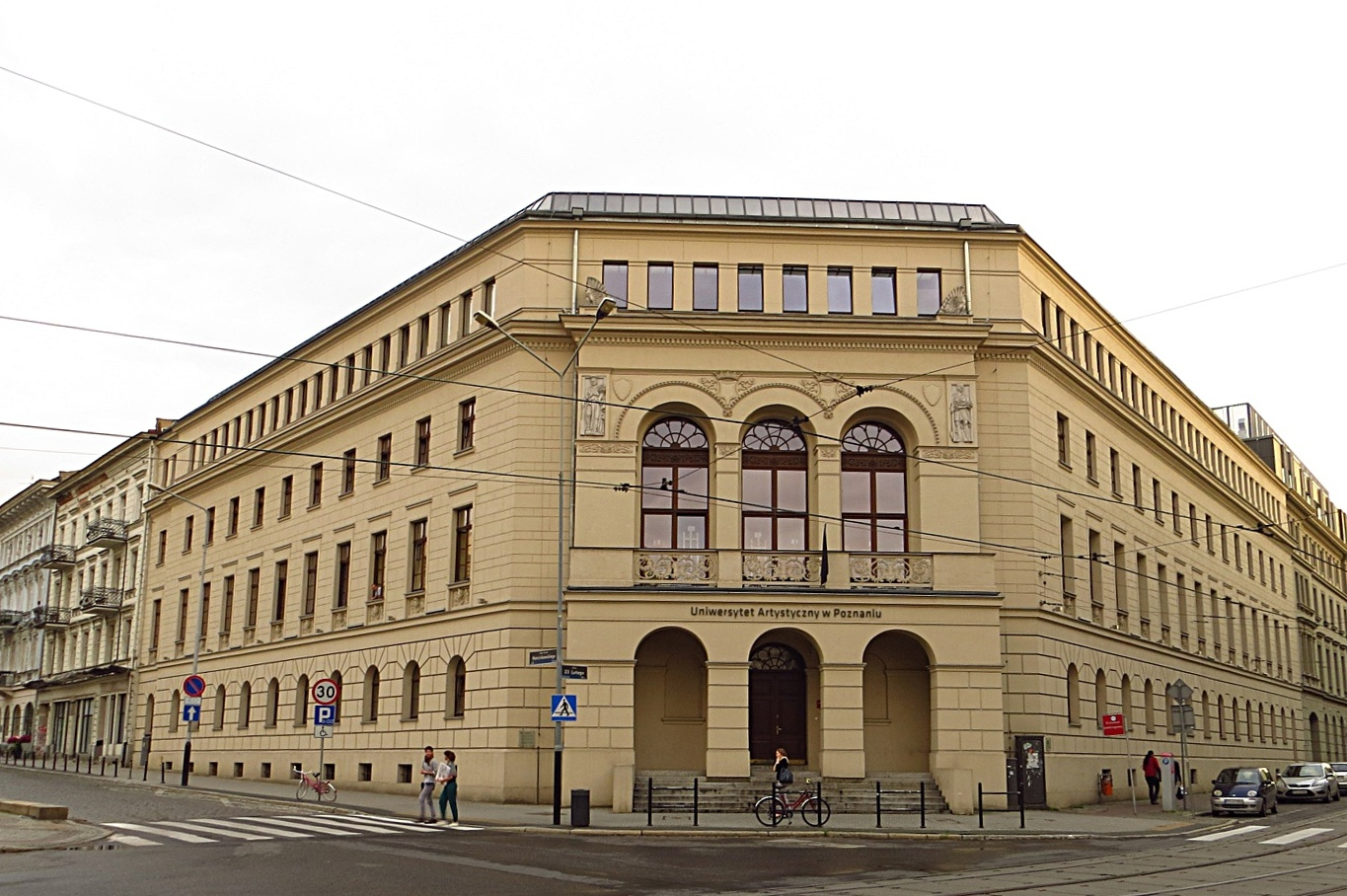
University of Fine Arts in Poznań

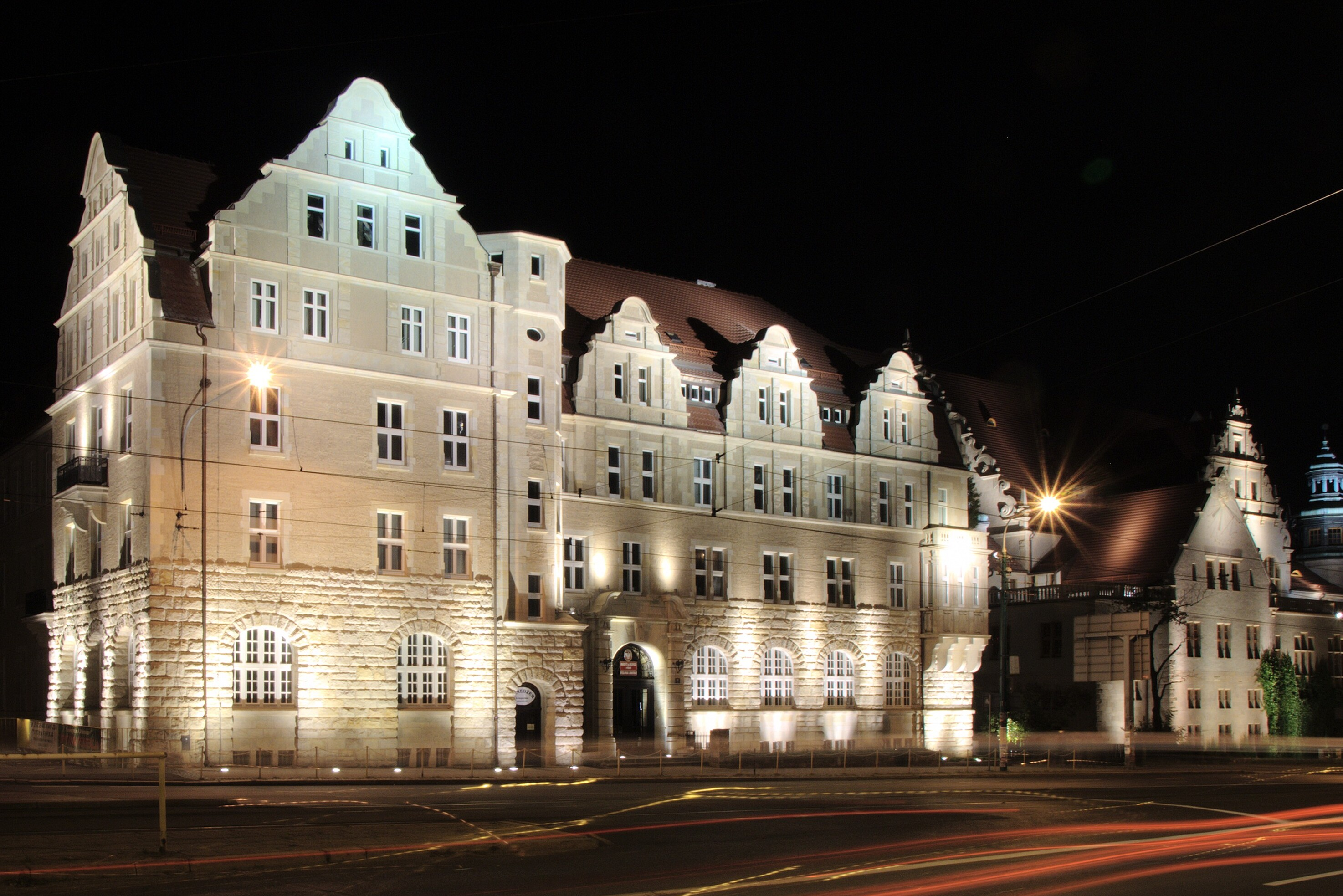
Adam Mickiewicz University – Collegium Iuridicum

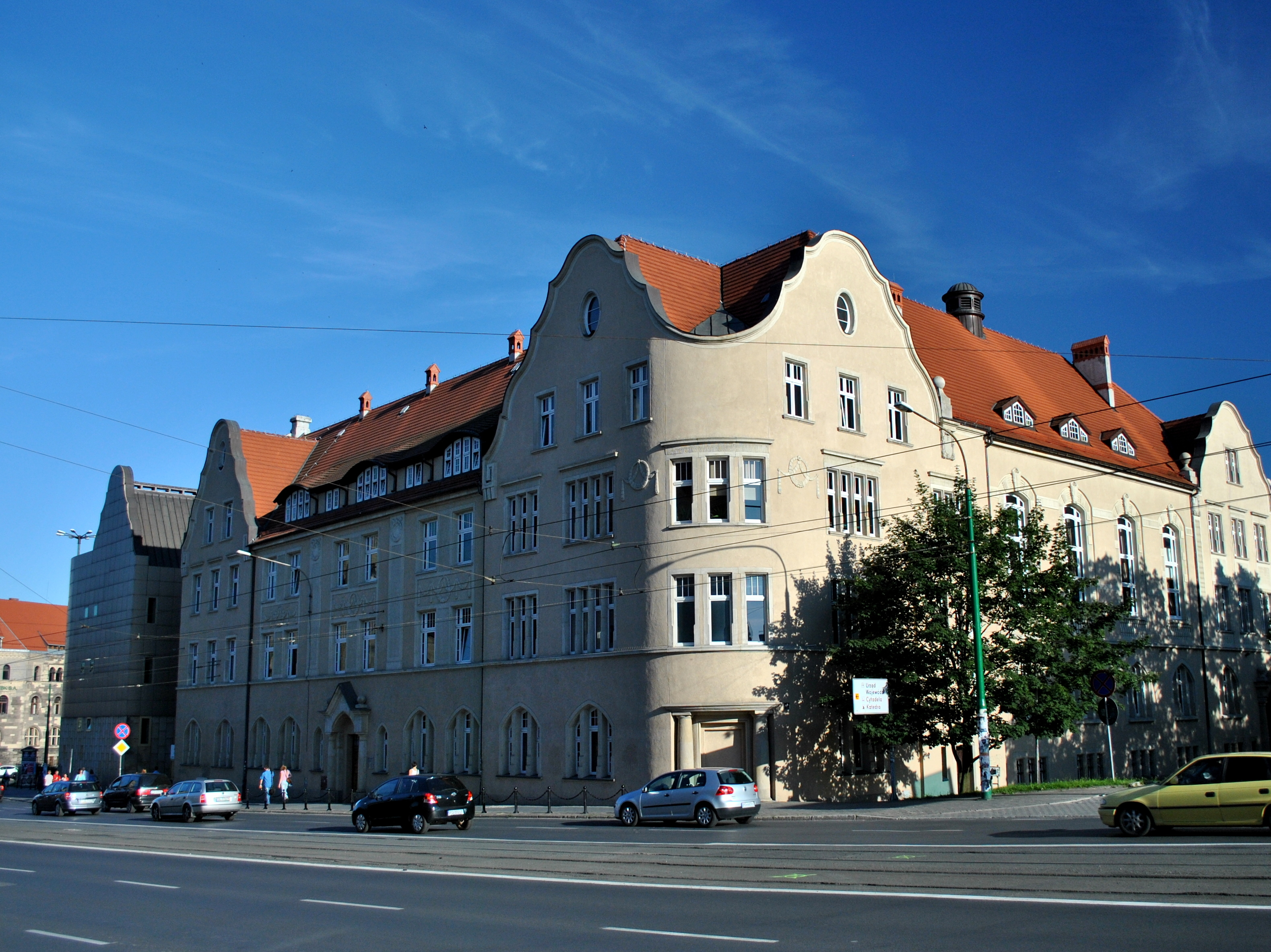
Academy of Music

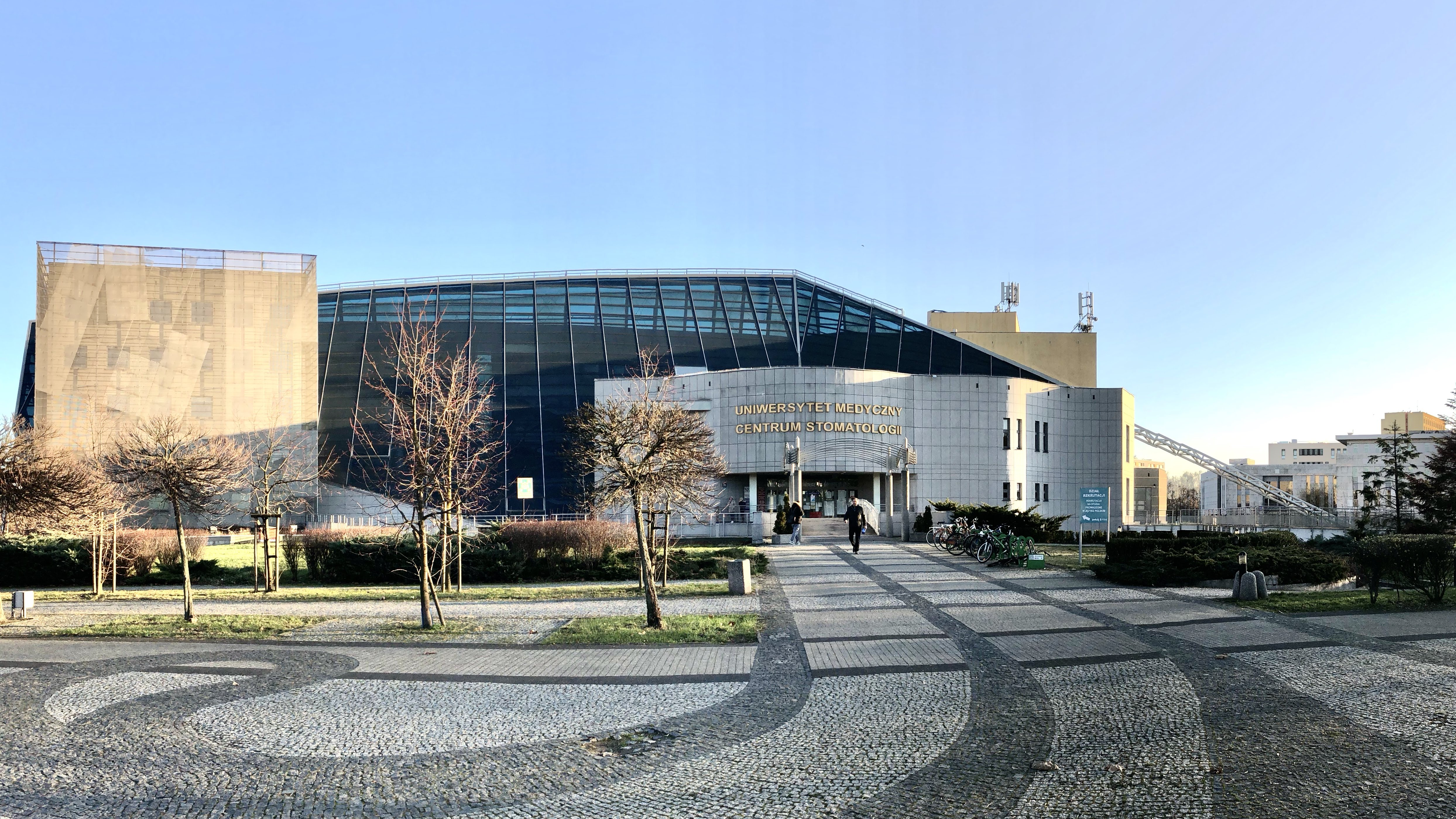
Medical University – Collegium Stomatologicum

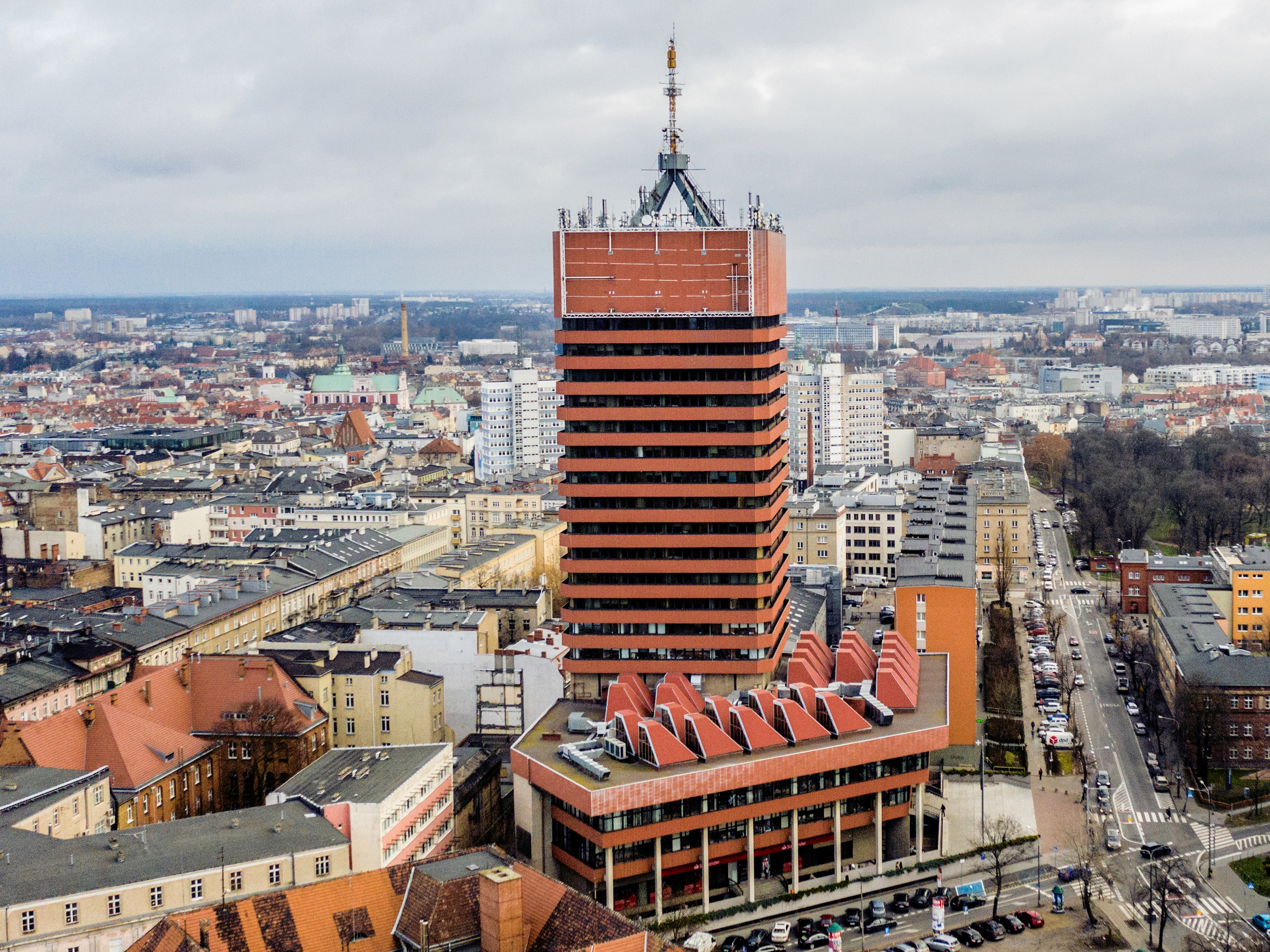
University of Economics – Collegium Altum

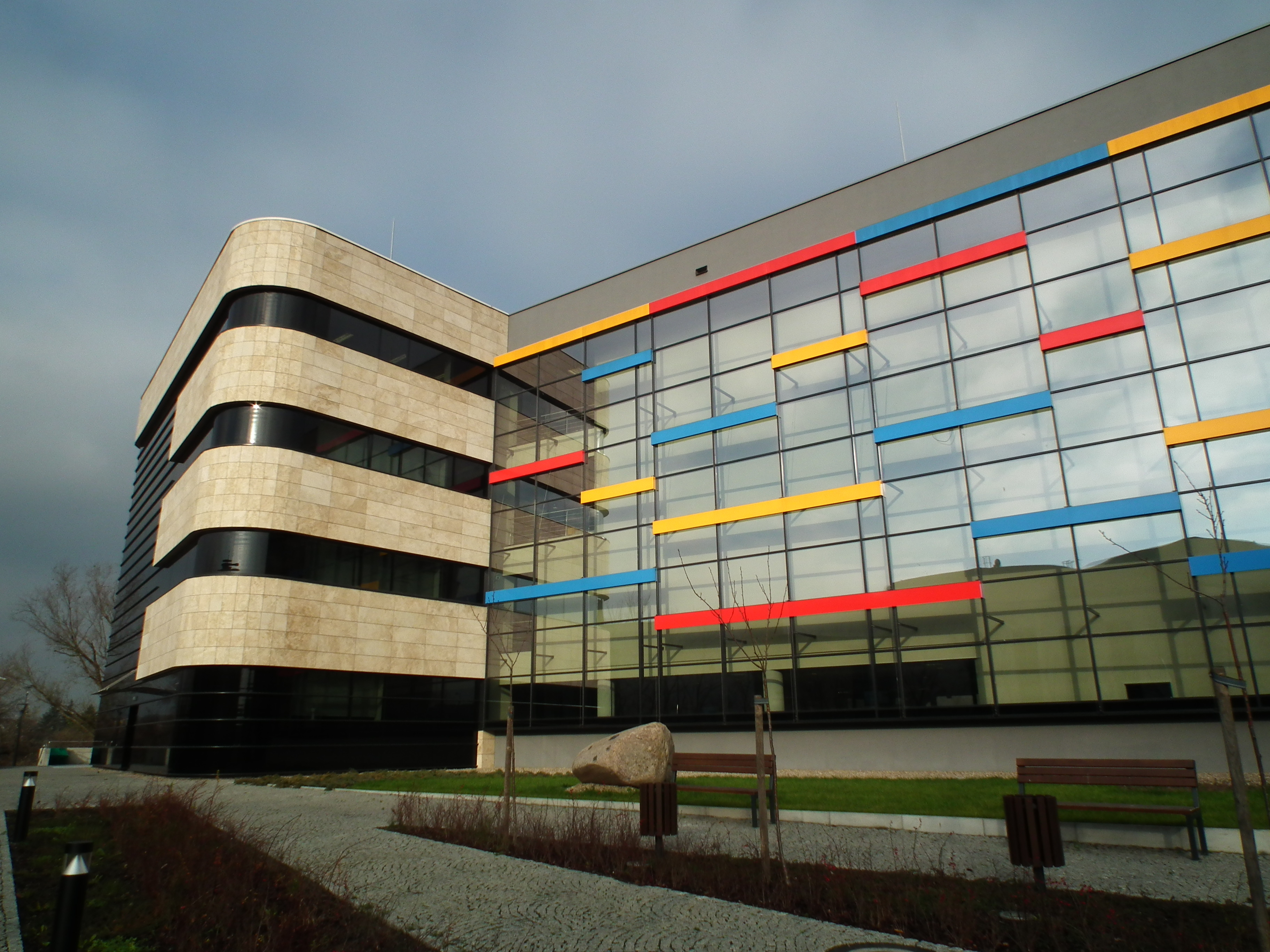
University of Technology – Faculty of Chemical Technologies

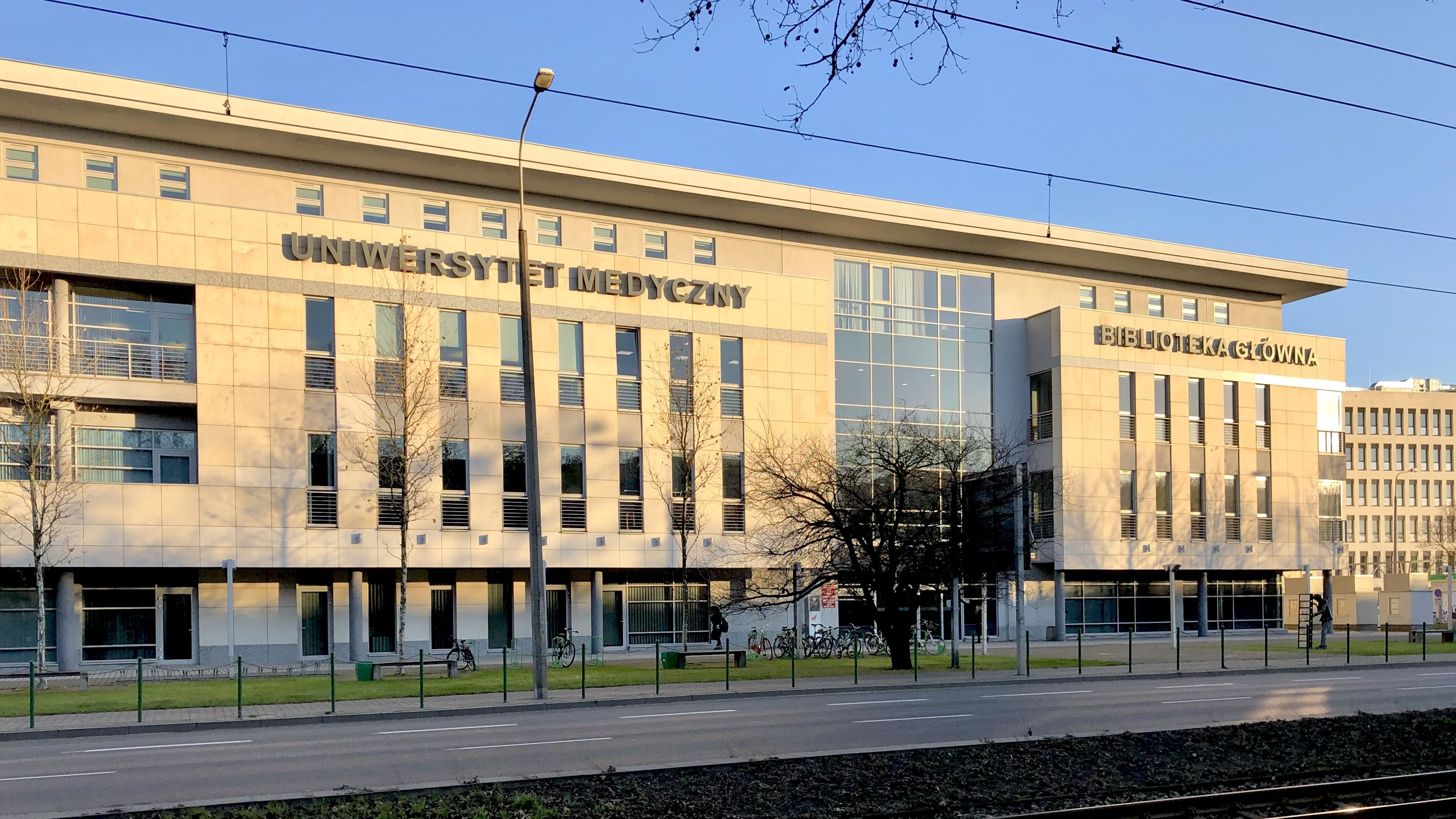
Medical University – Library

=== Private universities ===
There is also a great number of smaller, mostly private-run colleges and institutions of higher education, including SWPS University of Social Sciences and Humanities, Collegium Da Vinci, and WSB University.

=== High schools ===
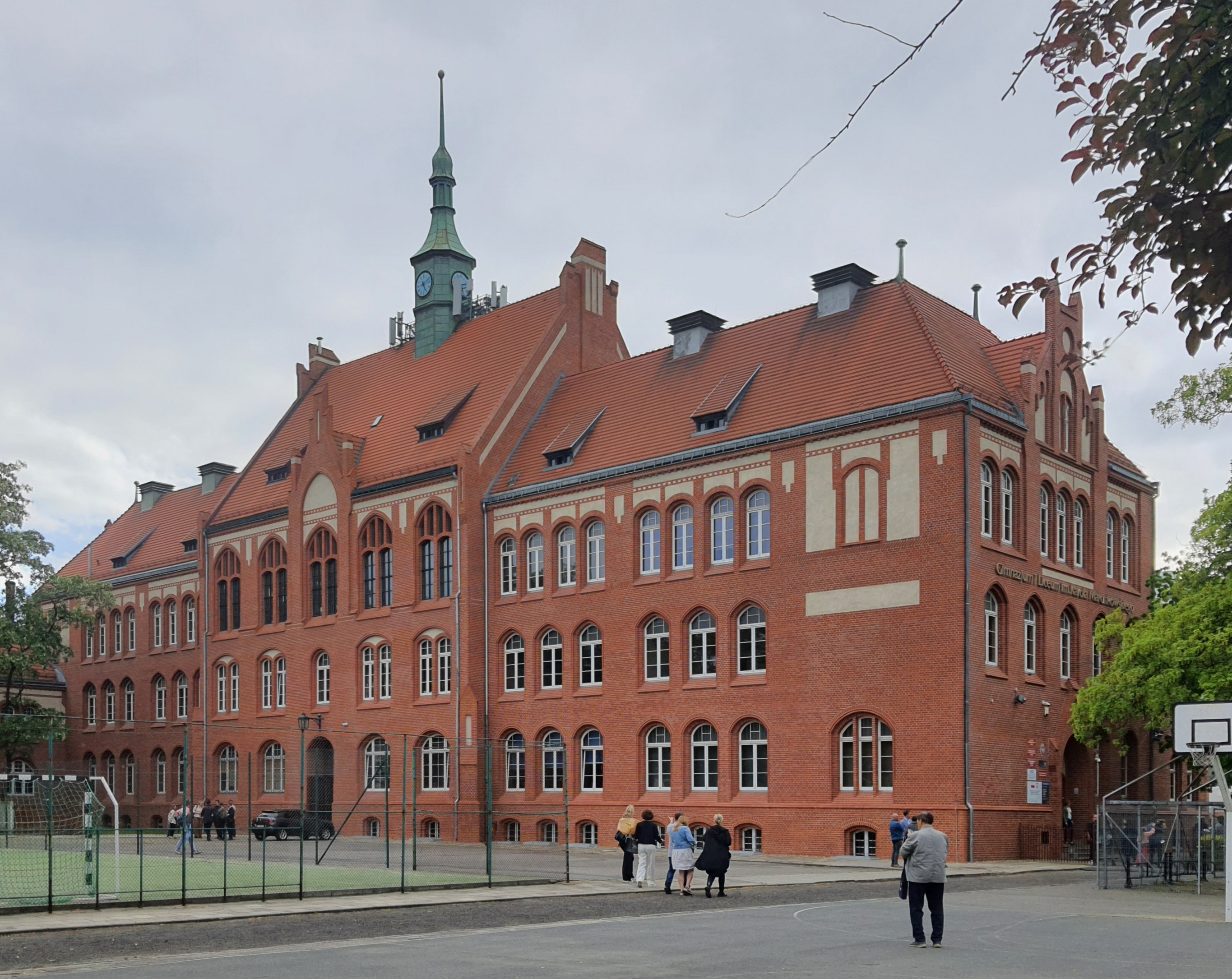
Karol Marcinkowski High School

Poznań has numerous high schools, which have different programmes focusing on different subjects. Some of the most notable are:

- Adam Mickiewicz High School
- Karol Marcinkowski High School
- St. John Cantius High School
- St. Mary Magdalene High School

=== Research ===
- Polish Academy of Sciences, the branch in Poznań
- Poznań Society of Friends of Arts and Sciences
- Poznań Supercomputing and Networking Center
- Western Institute

== Sport ==
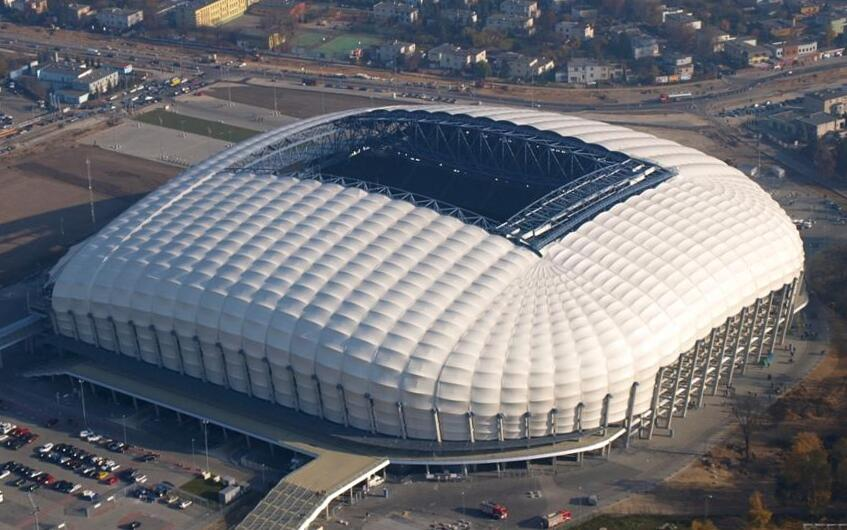
Municipal Stadium.

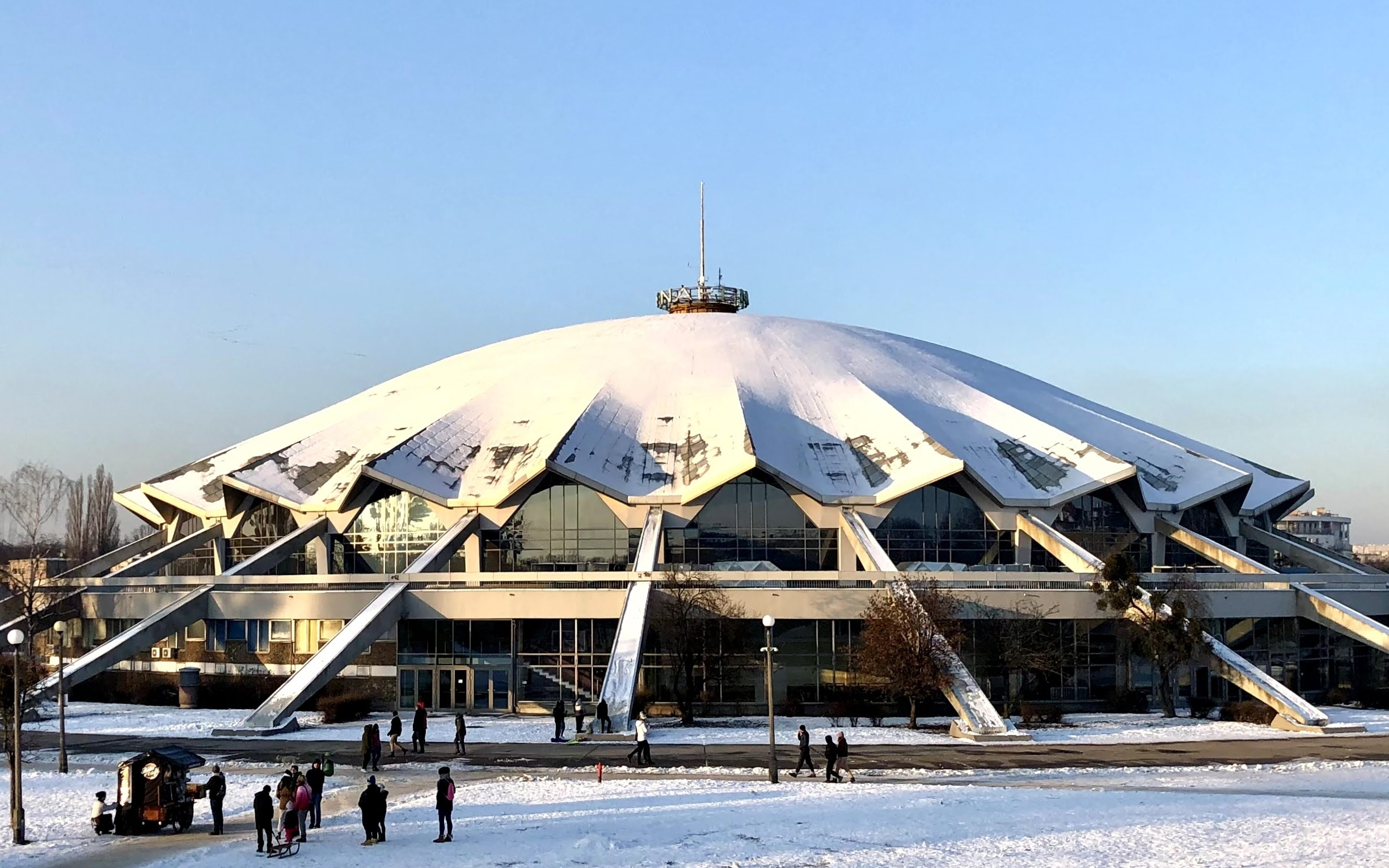
Hala Arena in winter.

There are several multi-sport clubs in Poznań. Warta Poznań was one of the most successful clubs in pre-World War II history, and Lech Poznań football team frequently plays in European cups. Lech plays at the Municipal Stadium, which hosted the 2012 European Championship group stages as well as the opening game and the final of the 2006 under-19 Euro Championship. Warta usually plays at the small Dębińska Road Stadium, a former training ground for Edmund Szyc Stadium, however, since the latter fell into disrepair in 1998 and was sold in 2001, it became the team's main ground. The club was planning to rebuild Szyc Stadium with historical 60,000-seat capacity. In recent seasons Warta played their matches at the Dyskobolia Stadium in Grodzisk Wielkopolski, as their current did not fulfill the footballing authority's requirements.

The city's third professional football team of multi-sport Olimpia Poznań club ceased activity in 2004, and the club focused on other sports, achieving good results in judo and tennis. Olimpia is hosting the annual tennis Poznań Open tournament at its Olimpia Tennis Park. The club owns a large sports complex near Rusałka lake, and apart from the tennis facilities boasts a large city recreation areas: mountain biking facilities with a four-cross track, an athletics stadium with 3,000 capacity, and a football-speedway stadium with 20,000 capacity. The latter had fallen into vast disrepair until it was acquired by the City Council from the Police in 2013 and was renovated. The football-speedway stadium hosts speedway club PSŻ Poznań, rugby union side NKR Chaos, American football team the Armia Poznań, and football team Poznaniak Poznań.

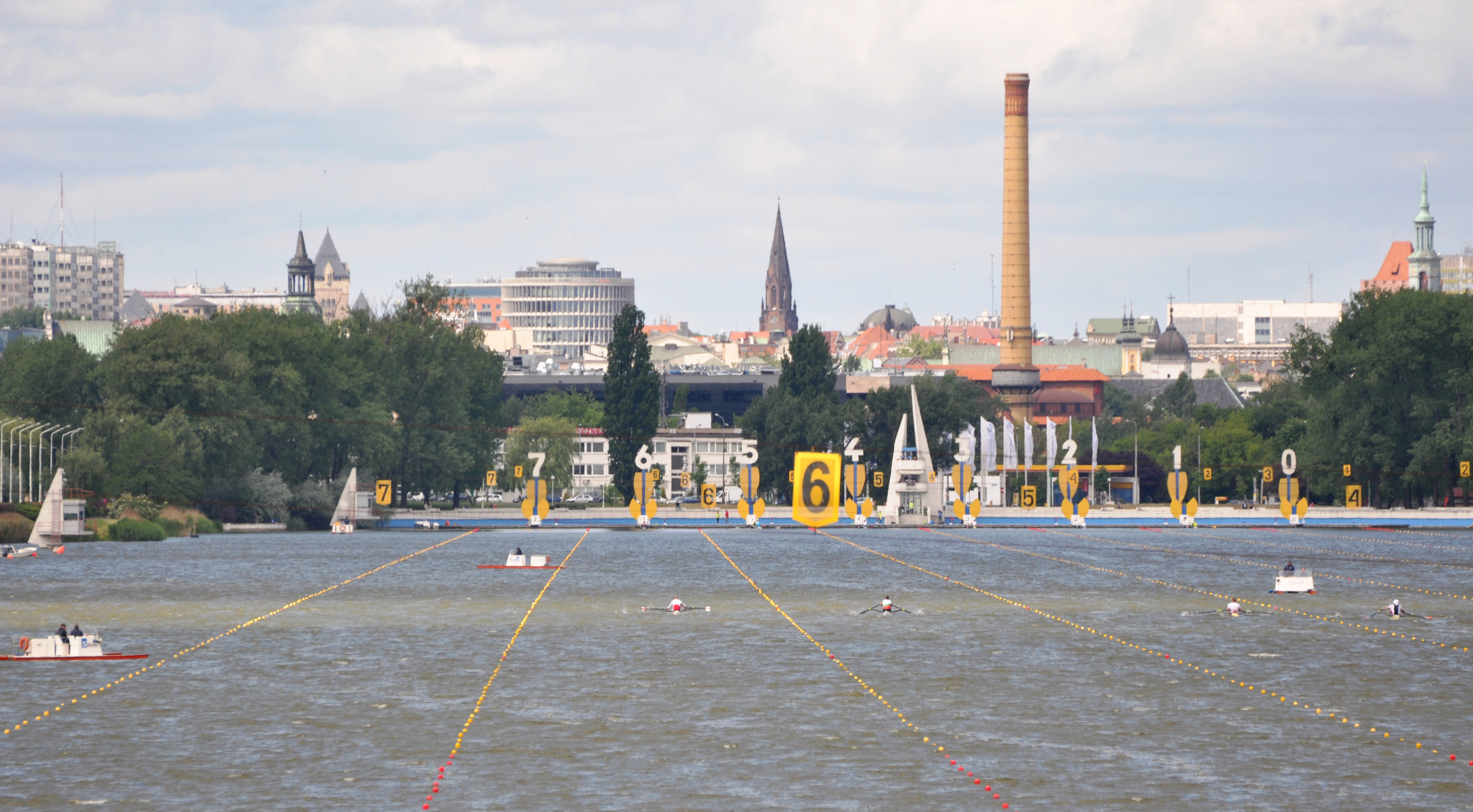
Malta Lake – a view of the start line during the 2015 European Rowing Championships.

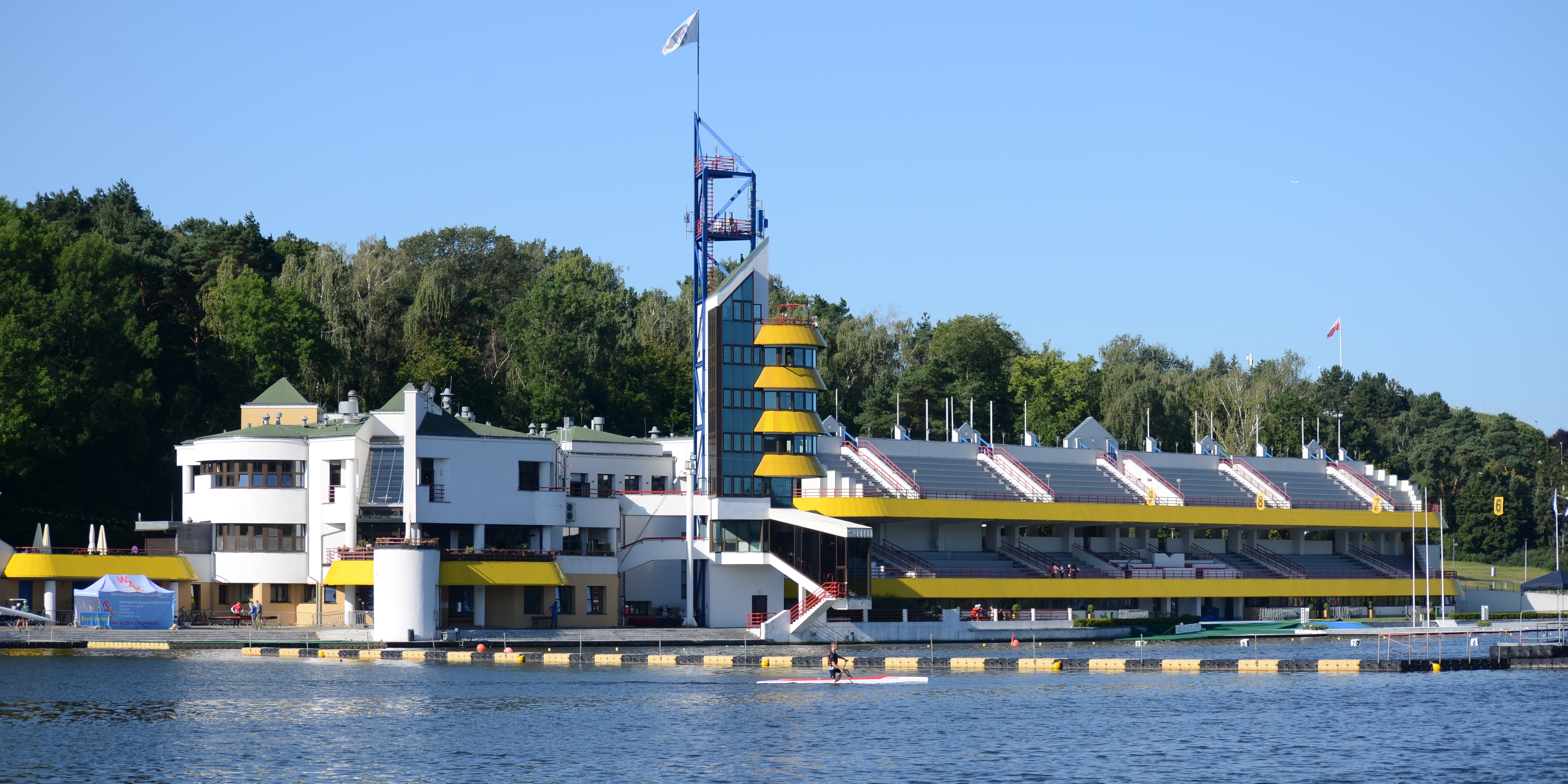
Spectator stands in the southeastern part of Lake Malta.

The artificial Malta lake, which was formed in 1952 and is about 2.2 km (1.4 mi) long, hosted the 2009 World Rowing Championships and some regattas of the World Rowing Cup. It also held the ICF Canoe Sprint World Championships in 1990, 2001, and 2010.

Termy Maltańskie, big water sports and recreation complex featuring Olympic-size swimming pool, is located at the north bank of the lake. A 50-metre pool can be divided into two 25-metre pools. The other pool with a diving tower also fulfils all requirements necessary for organizing sports competitions. Termy Maltańskie consists of as many as 18 sports and recreational swimming pools with a total water surface area of 5,000 m^{2} (54,000 ft^{2}) as well as many other attractions such as different kind of saunas and spa, among others. The complex uses natural geothermal waters drawn nearby from a depth of 1,306 metres (4,285 ft) and saturated with beneficial minerals and elements, for some of the swimming pools.

At the south bank of the lake, Malta-Ski year-round skiing complex is situated, and hosts minor sporting competitions, equipped with a toboggan run and a minigolf course. There is also a roller rink with a roller skating club nearby.

Since 2000, the city has been the host of the Poznań Marathon, one of the largest such races in the country.

Poznań's multi-purpose sports and entertainment indoor arena is simply called Arena. Located west of city centre and built in 1974, it originally seated about 5,500 people and is used for many different sports and cultural events such as volleyball and concerts, among others. The facility has since been modernized, including lowering the level of the ground floor to increase arena capacity to about 9,200. Poznań has experience as a host for international sporting events such as the 2009 EuroBasket.

The city has the largest motorsport race track in Poland, Tor Poznań, located at the west city's suburbs in Przeźmierowo.

Poznań is also considered to be the hotbed of Polish field hockey, with several teams of Warta Poznań, Grunwald Poznań – multi-sport club which also has shooting, wrestling, handball and tennis sections, Pocztowiec Poznań, and AZS AWF Poznań – an academic club which also fields professional teams in women's volleyball and basketball. Other clubs include: Posnania Poznań – one of the best rugby union teams in the country, Polonia Poznań – formerly a multi-sport club achieving many successes in rugby with only a football section remaining, KKS Wiara Lecha – football club formed by the supporters of Lech Poznań, and Odlew Poznań – arguably the most well-known amateur club in the country due to their extensive media coverage and exploits. There are also numerous rhythmic gymnastics and synchronised swimming clubs, as well as numerous less notable amateur football teams.

The E11 European long distance path for hikers passes through Poznań.

Poznań bid for the 2014 Summer Youth Olympics but lost to Nanjing, with the Chinese city receiving 47 votes over Poznań's 42.

== Public services ==
=== Healthcare ===
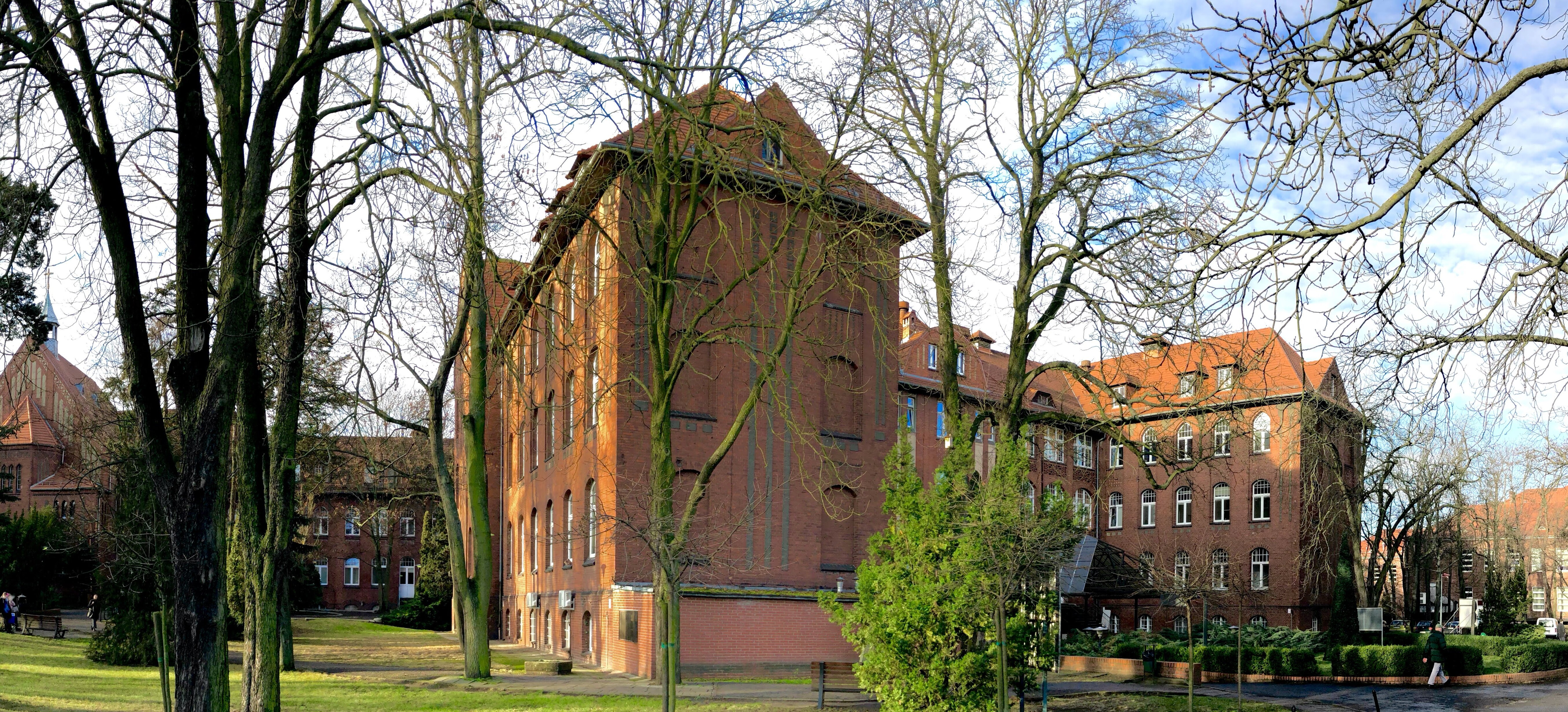
Heliodor Święcicki Clinical Hospital

A total of 574 healthcare providers offer outpatient services to the residents of Poznań. The independent public healthcare facilities providing inpatient care include municipal hospitals:

- Franciszek Raszeja City Hospital on Mickiewicza Street,
- Józef Struś Multi-Specialty City Hospital on Szwajcarska Street,
- Care and Treatment and Medical Rehabilitation Facility on Mogileńska Street.

The municipal hospitals employ just over 2,000 people.

In addition to the stationary treatment facilities managed by the City of Poznań, there are 20 hospitals operating, including 5 hospitals under the jurisdiction of the Greater Poland Voivodeship, 5 clinical hospitals affiliated with the Poznań University of Medical Sciences, and 10 private hospitals.

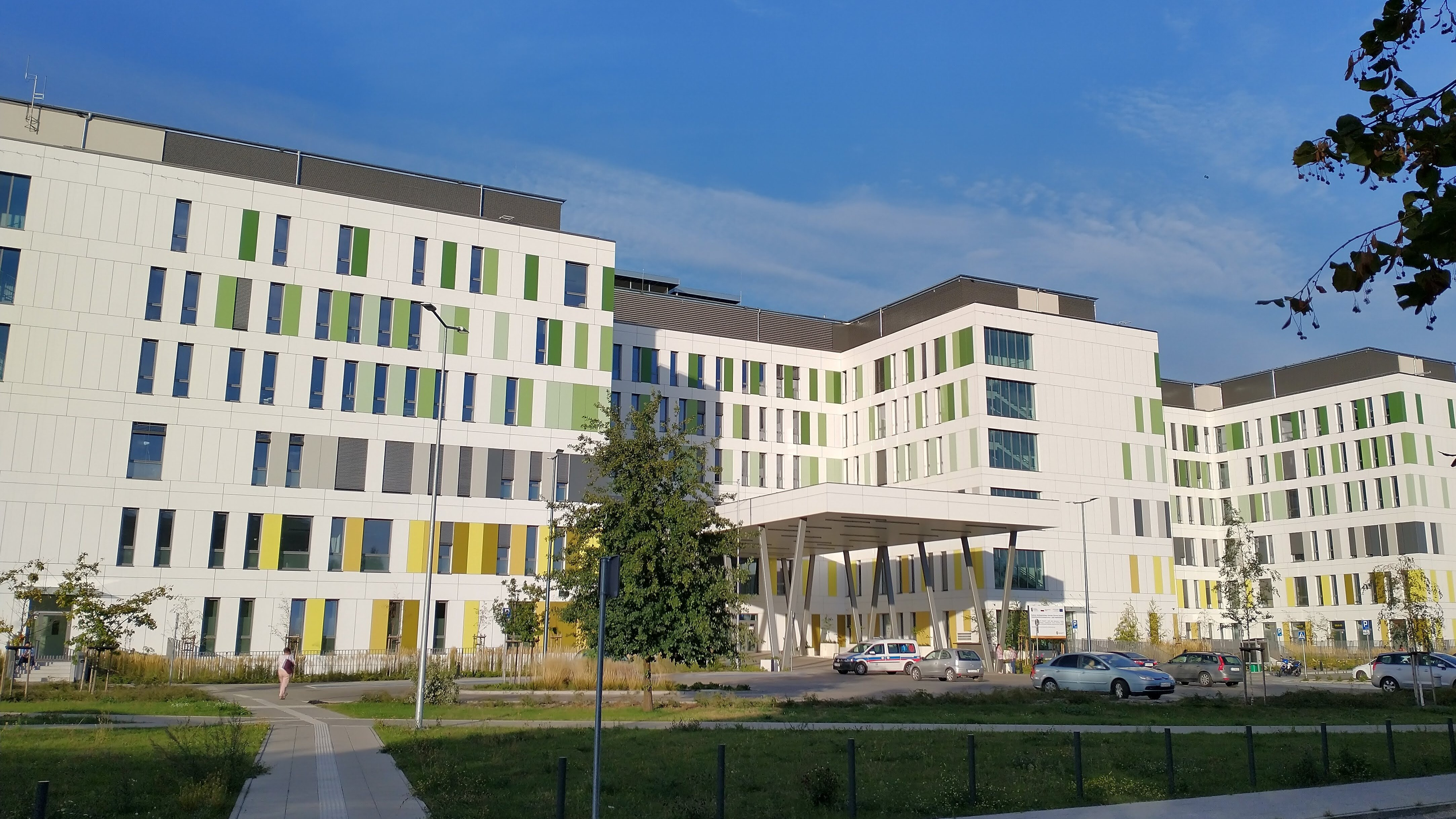
Greater Poland Center for Pediatrics

Hospitals managed by the Greater Poland Voivodeship:

- Central Voivodeship Hospital on Juraszów Street,
- Greater Poland Cancer Center at Garbary Street,
- Greater Poland Center for Pulmonology and Thoracic Surgery, named after Eugenia and Janusz Zeyland, on Szamarzewskiego Street,
- Greater Poland Center for Pediatrics on Wrzoska Street,
- Greater Poland Center for Rehabilitation on Sanatoryjna Street.

Clinical hospitals of the Karol Marcinkowski Medical University:

- Clinical Hospital of the Transfiguration of the Lord on Długa Street,
- Heliodor Święcicki Clinical Hospital on Przybyszewskiego Street,
- Specialist Clinical Hospital, formerly the 111th Military Hospital, on Grunwaldzka Street,
- Gynecological and Obstetric Clinical Hospital on Polna Street,
- Wiktor Dega Orthopedic and Rehabilitation Clinical Hospital on 28 Czerwca 1956 Street.

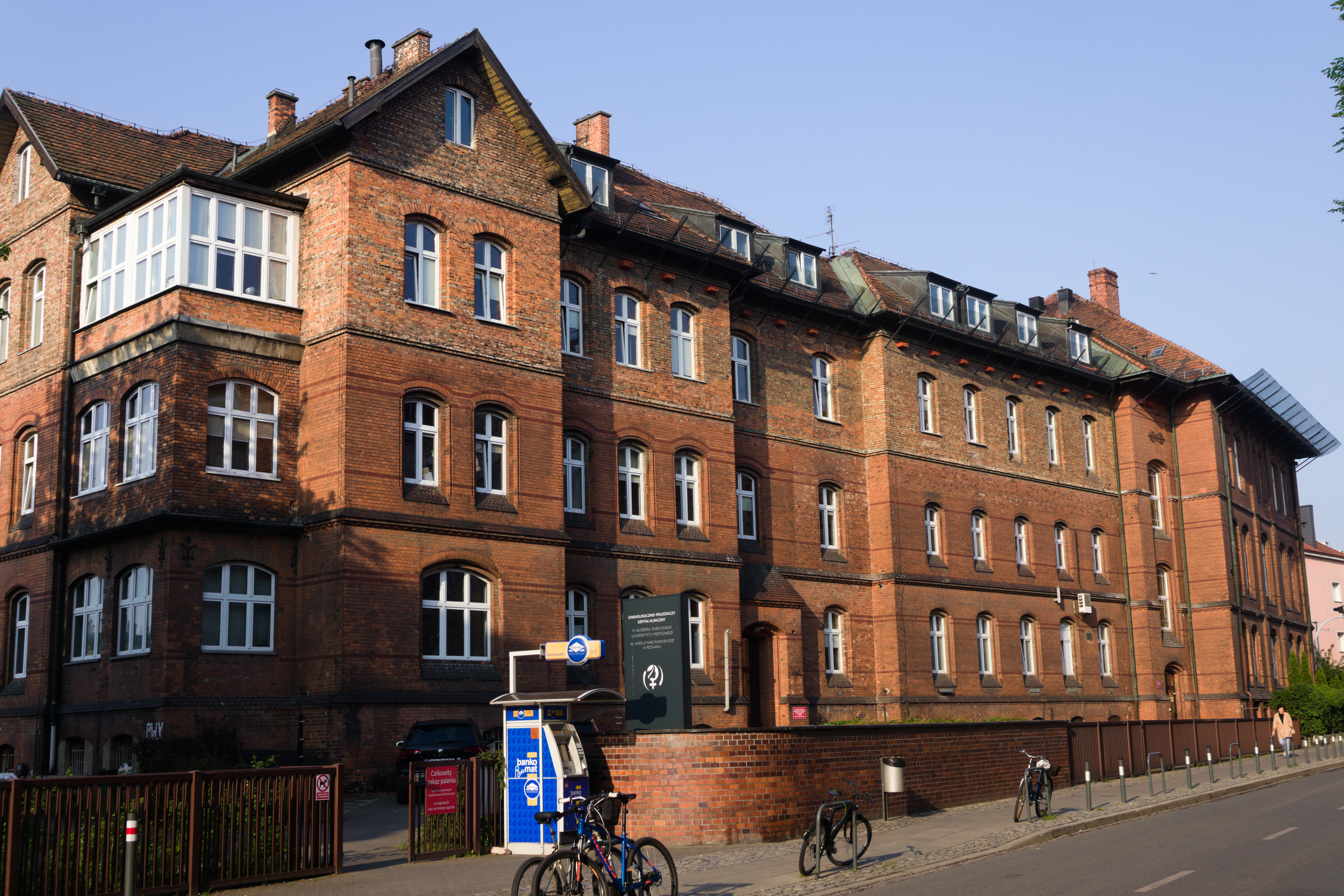
Gynecological and Obstetric Clinical Hospital

Some of the private hospitals include:

- Hipolit Cegielski Medical Center on 28 Czerwca 1956 Street,
- St. Adalbert's Hospital on Krzywoustego Street,
- Certus Hospital on Grunwaldzka Street,
- Medica Celsus Hospital and Clinic on Unii Lubelskiej Street,
- Promienista Clinic on Promienista Street,
- Med-Polonia on Obornicka Street,
- Pro Bono Clinic on Leszczyńska Street,
- Rehasport Clinic on Górecka Street,
- St. George's Ophthalmology Center on Jasielska Street.

Additionally, on the Dojazd Street, there is a departmental hospital administered by the Ministry of the Interior and Administration.

Besides the hospital care Poznań Center for Specialist Medical Services (POSUM) on Solidarności Avenue provides services in the fields of outpatient treatment, diagnostics, rehabilitation, preventive care, and occupational medicine.

Each year, more than 300,000 people are hospitalized in Poznań. The clinical hospitals of the Poznań University of Medical Sciences have the highest number of beds and patients, accounting for about 56% of the total.

=== Police and Municipal Guard ===
In Poznań, various Police units operate across different administrative levels to ensure public safety. At the regional level, the Voivodship Police Headquarters in Poznań (Komenda Wojewódzka Policji w Poznaniu, KWP) coordinates police activities across the entire Greater Poland Voivodeship. Within the city, the Municipal Police Headquarters in Poznań (Komenda Miejska Policji w Poznaniu, KMP) plays a key role in maintaining order and safety. KMP supervises several police stations located in different districts:

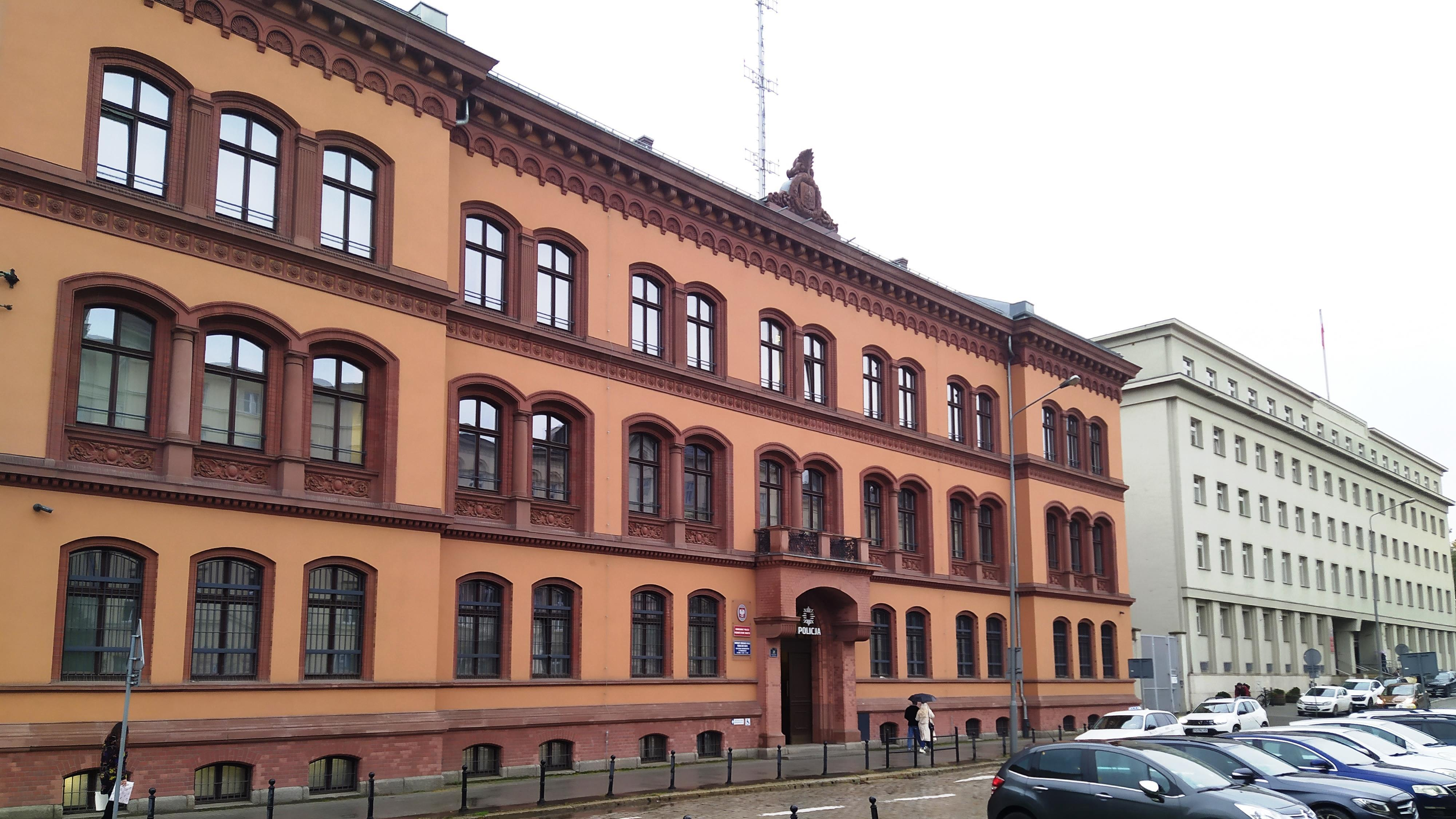
Police Station – Old Town

- Police Station – North (Komisariat Policji – Północ)
- Police Station – Old Town (Komisariat Policji – Stare Miasto)
- Police Station – New Town (Komisariat Policji – Nowe Miasto)
- Police Station – Grunwald (Komisariat Policji – Grunwald)
- Police Station – Jeżyce (Komisariat Policji – Jeżyce)
- Police Station – Wilda (Komisariat Policji – Wilda)

Additionally, the Municipal Police Headquarters oversees stations in the Poznań County, including locations in Murowana Goślina, Suchy Las, Swarzędz, Kostrzyn, Pobiedziska, Tarnowo Podgórne, Buk, Stęszew, Komorniki, Luboń, Puszczykowo, Mosina, Kórnik, Dopiewo, Kleszczewo, Rokietnica, and Przeźmierowo.

The Municipal Police Headquarters in Poznań employs approximately 1,800 officers. Each station is responsible for patrolling and responding to incidents within its jurisdiction. In some areas of the city, smaller police posts provide additional law enforcement presence, supporting the main stations and serving local communities. All these units work closely together to effectively protect Poznań's residents. Since September 2016, the National Safety Threat Map (Krajowa Mapa Zagrożeń Bezpieczeństwa) has been active in the area covered by the Poznań Municipal Police Headquarters. This tool facilitates communication between the police and the public, aiming to improve safety in residential areas.

The City Guard (Straż Miejska Miasta Poznania) operates under the City Hall, overseeing five district branches and employing about 300 guards.

The city also maintains a video surveillance system to enhance safety and crime detection, with 395 cameras in operation. The footage is monitored and analysed by staff at six Surveillance Centers located within police stations. Additionally, the video feed is accessible to the Municipal Police Headquarters, the Traffic Management Center (ZDM), the MPK dispatch centre, the Crisis Management Center, and the City Guard headquarters.

== Transport ==
=== Rail ===
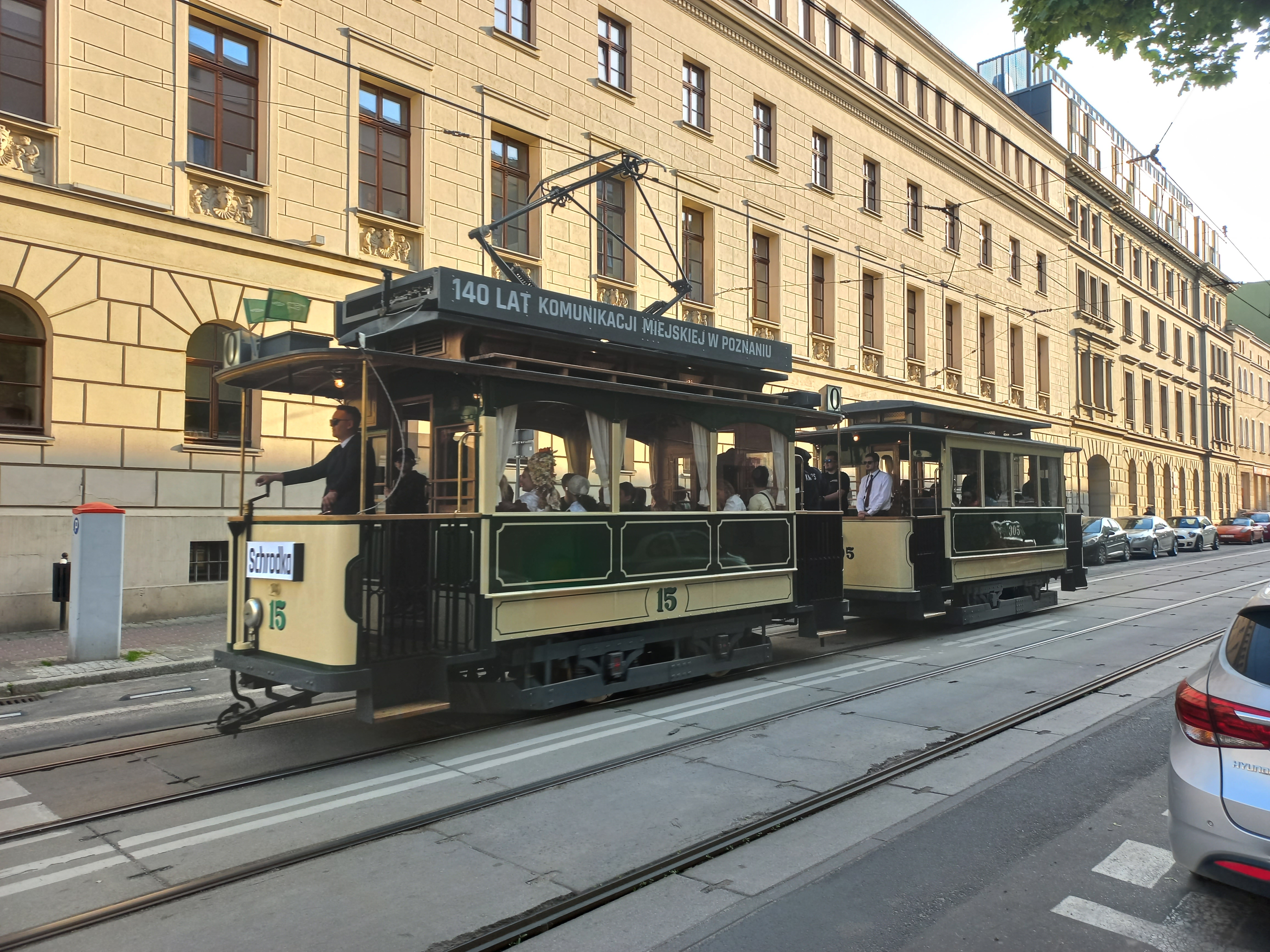
A historic tram with a Carl Weyer type I car on a tourist line. Cars of this type appeared on tram lines in Poznań in 1905.

Poznań railway node

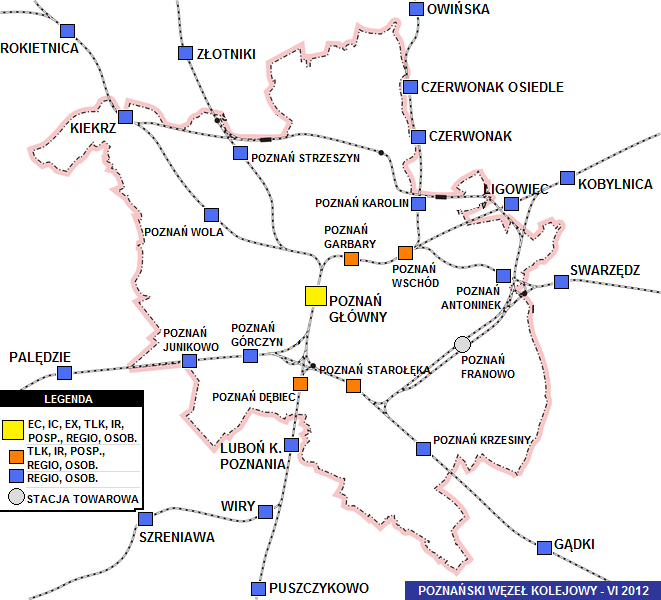
Poznań railway node as of 2012.

The main Poznań railway station is called Poznań Główny, and is located just southwest of the city centre. There are also the smaller East Poznań and Poznań Garbary stations northeast of the centre, and a number of other stations on the outskirts of the city. The main east–west A2 motorway runs south of the city centre connecting it with Berlin in the west and Łódż and Warsaw in the east, serving also as a centre bypass. Other main roads run in the direction of Warsaw, Bydgoszcz, Wągrowiec, Oborniki, Katowice, Wrocław, Buk and Berlin.

The Poznań Metropolitan Railway is a commuter railway serving the Poznań metropolitan area and surrounding places.

=== Air ===
Poznań air transport

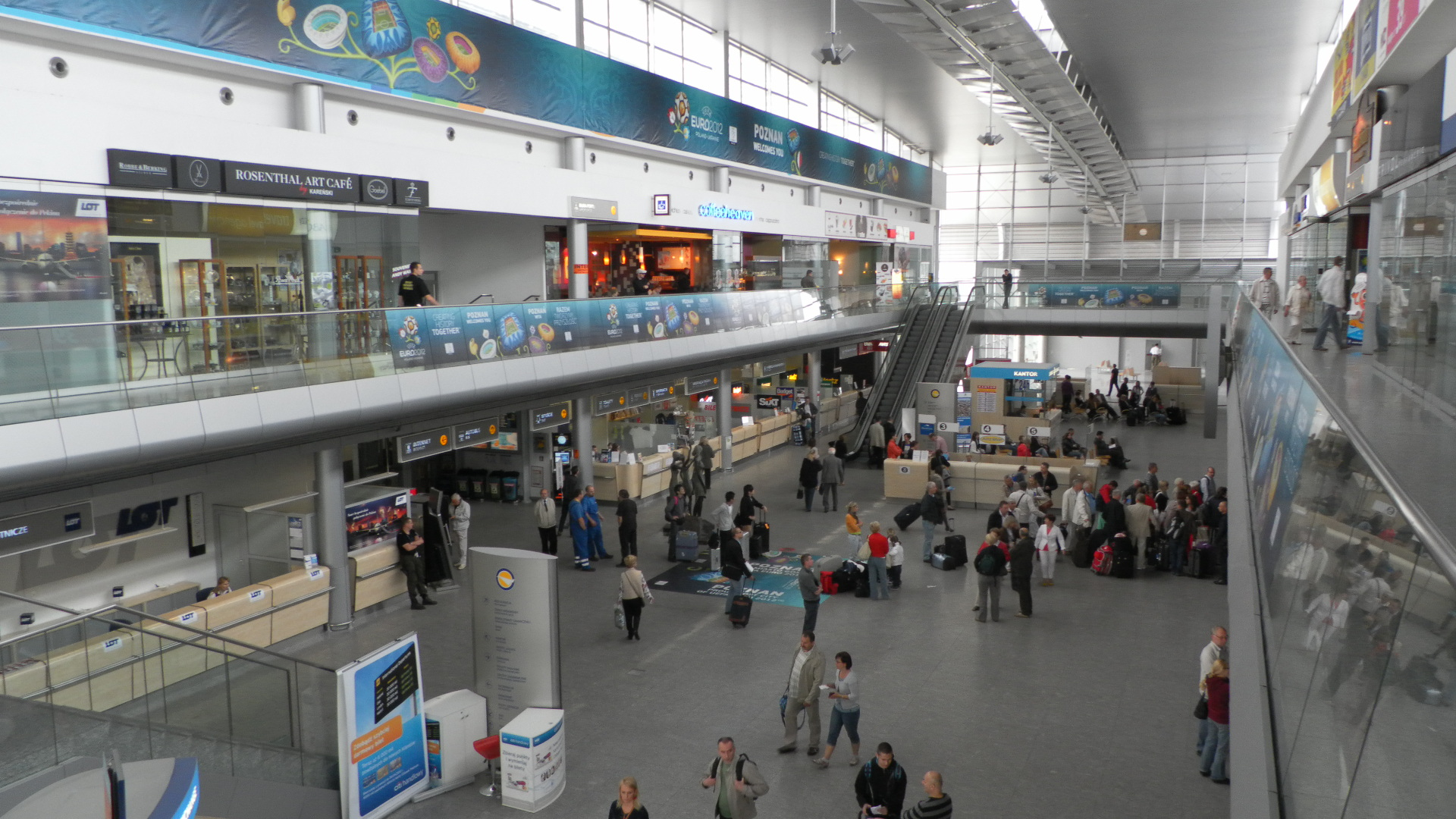
Wnętrze terminala T2 (odloty) na poznańskim lotnisku

The city has an international airport Poznań-Ławica. As of March 2013, flights could be flown from it to 25 airports located mainly in Western European countries. In addition, during the 2013 summer season, charter planes departed from Poznań to 36 popular resorts. In 2012. Ławica handled nearly 1.6 million passengers, which placed it in the 6th position in Poland in terms of air traffic volume. In 2016 it handled approximately 1.71 million passengers.

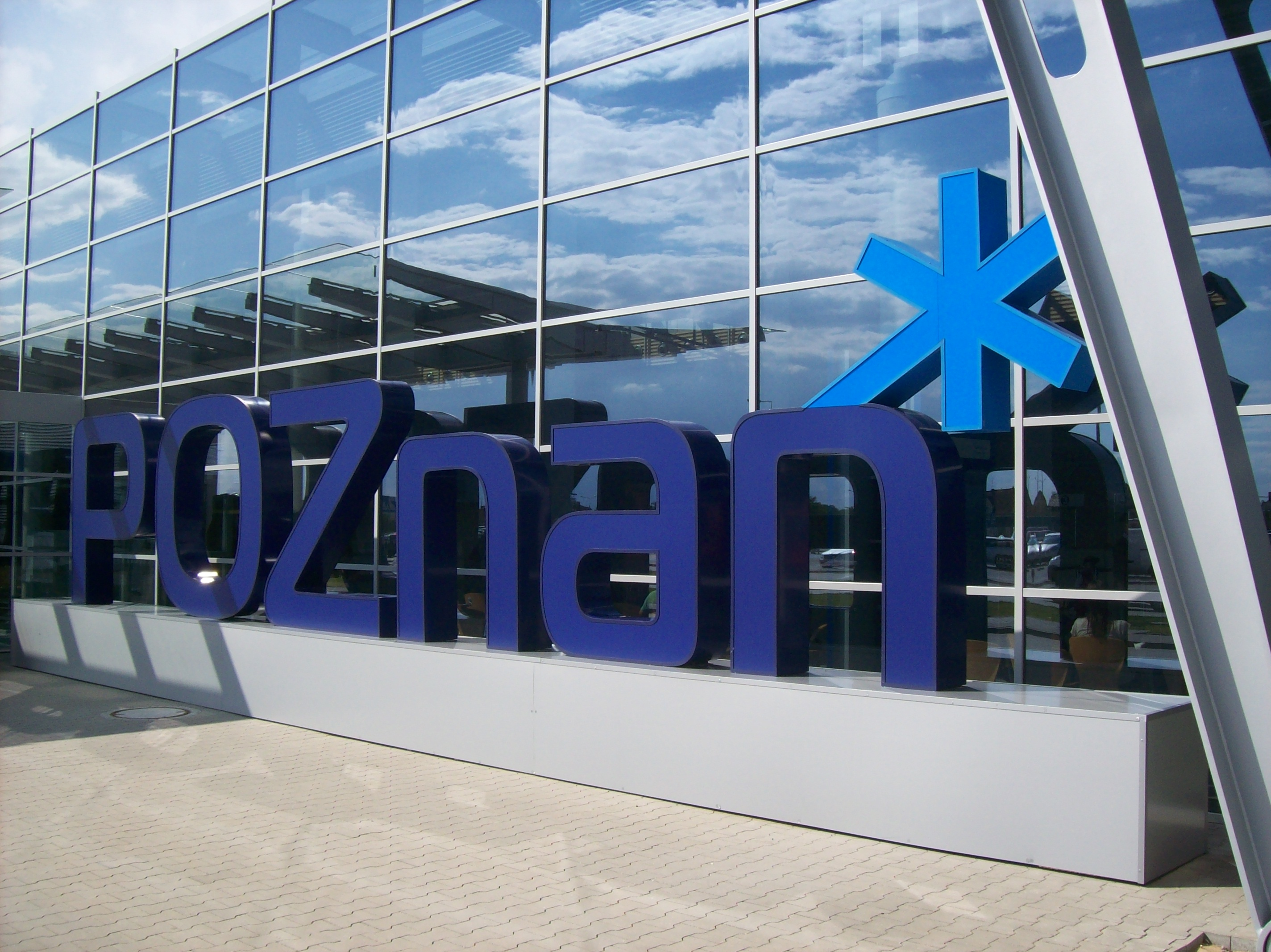
Poznań-Ławica Airport sign

=== Tram ===
City's tram network

Pestka Fast Tram Pestka extension Standard network, partially underground in the eastern part

Since the end of the communist era in 1989, city investments into transportation have been mostly into public transport. While the number of cars since 1989 has at least doubled, municipal policy concentrated on improving public transport, which mostly consists of trams and both urban and suburban buses. New tram lines are planned and built, including Pestka Fast Tram sections, and the rolling stock is being replaced for modern low-floor vehicles such as Solaris Tramino, Siemens Combino and Moderus Gamma trams, and buses such as Solaris Urbino.

Paid parking zones in the city centre were established, and Park & Ride car parks have been built to encourage commuters to leave their car on the outskirts of the city and continue their journey by public transport, as well as to allow safe and legal parking outside the city centre. Limiting car access to the strict centre actually increased the level of ridership.

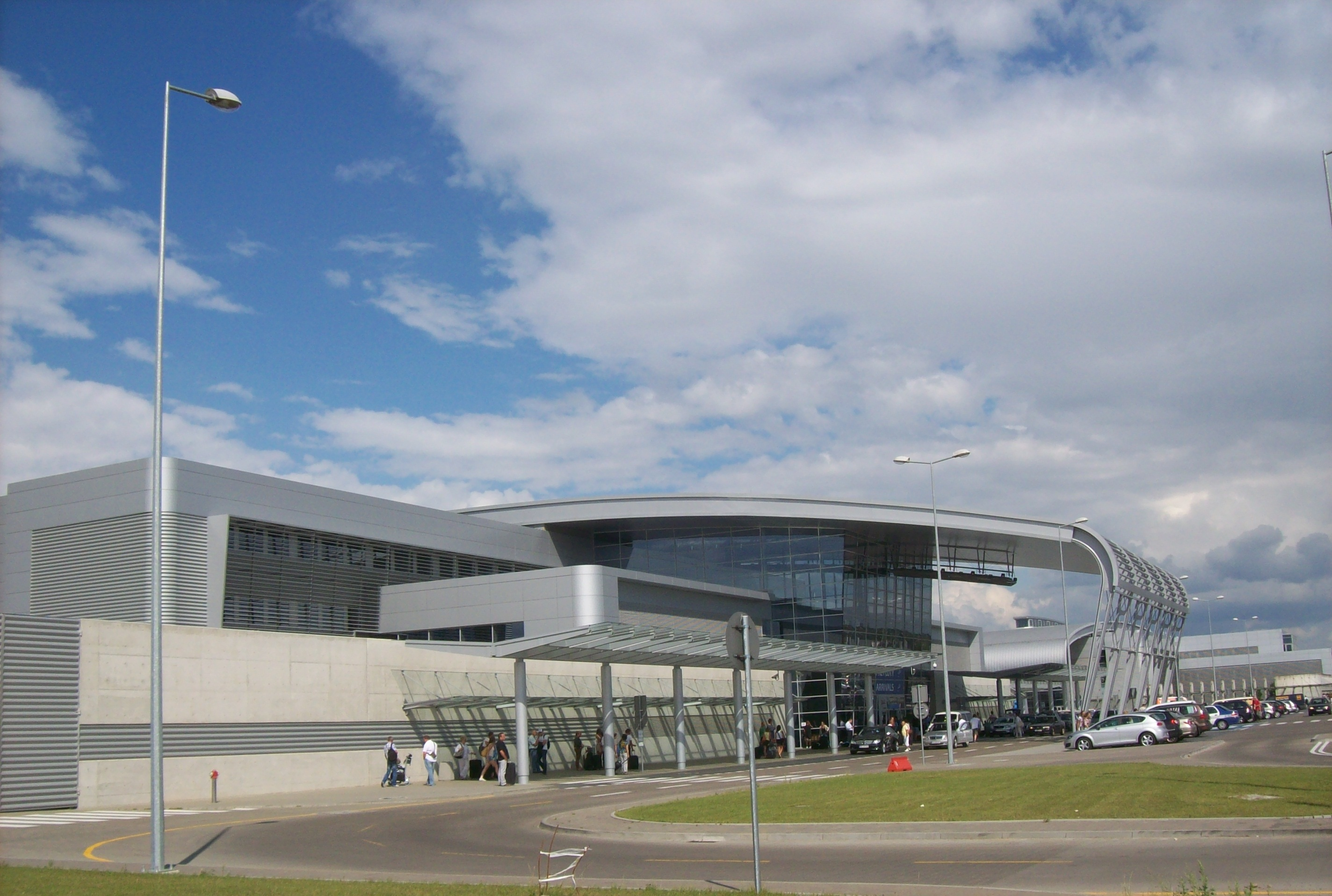
Ławica Airport.

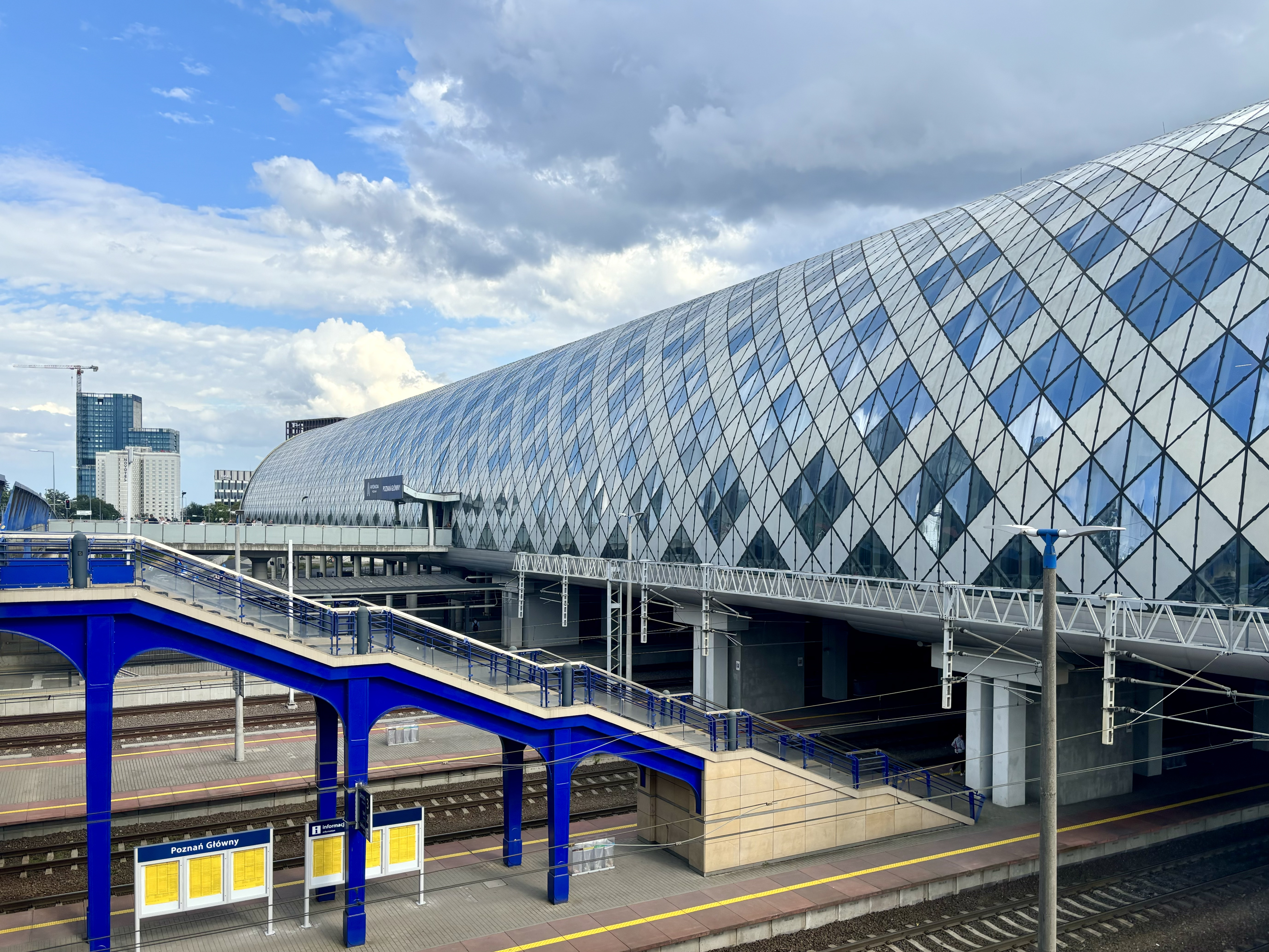
New and controversial main railway station Poznań Główny.

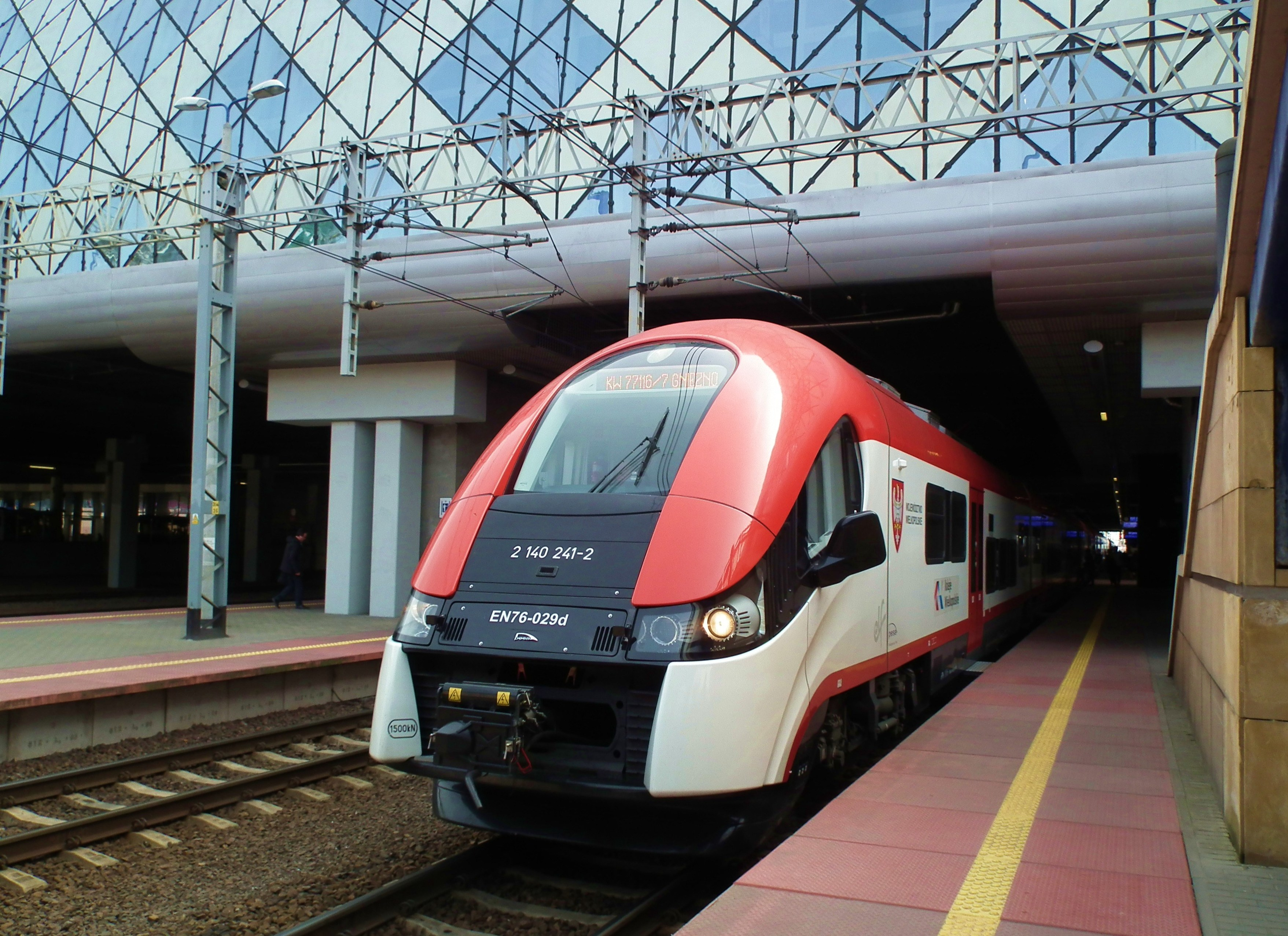
Greater Poland Railways train at Poznań Główny.

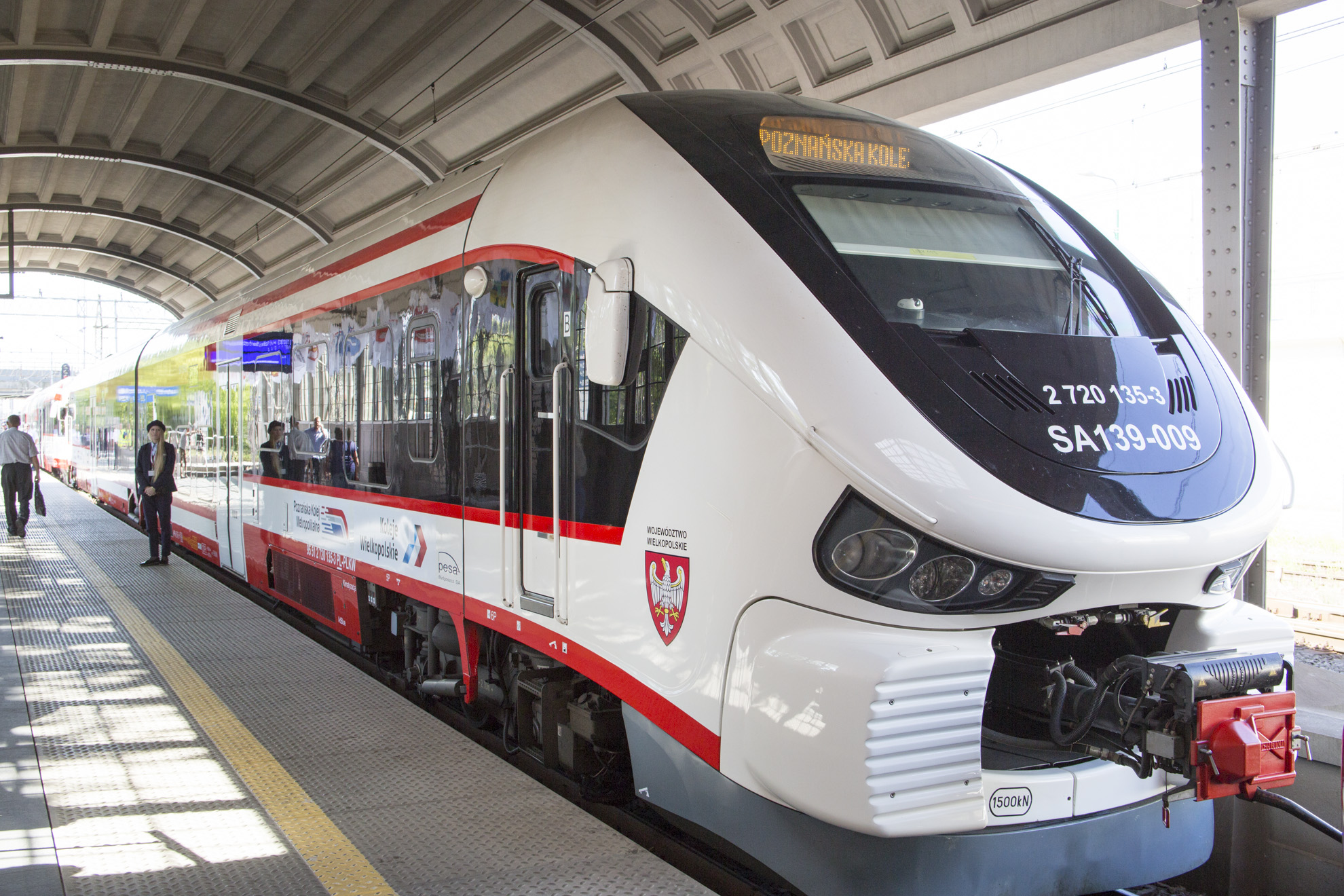
A Pesa Link SA139 in Poznań Metropolitan Railway livery

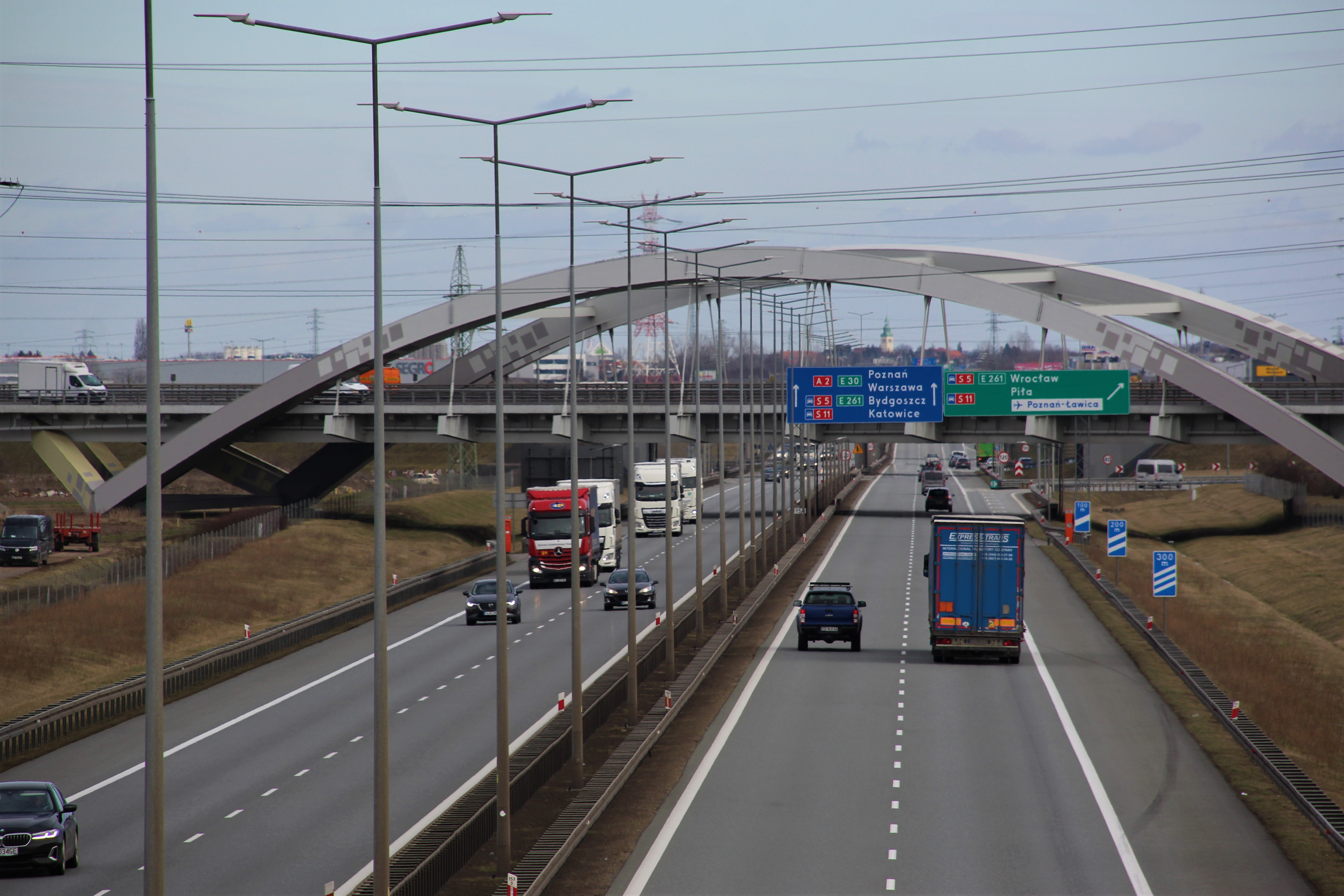
A2 motorway near the Poznań Zachód (Poznań West) junction.

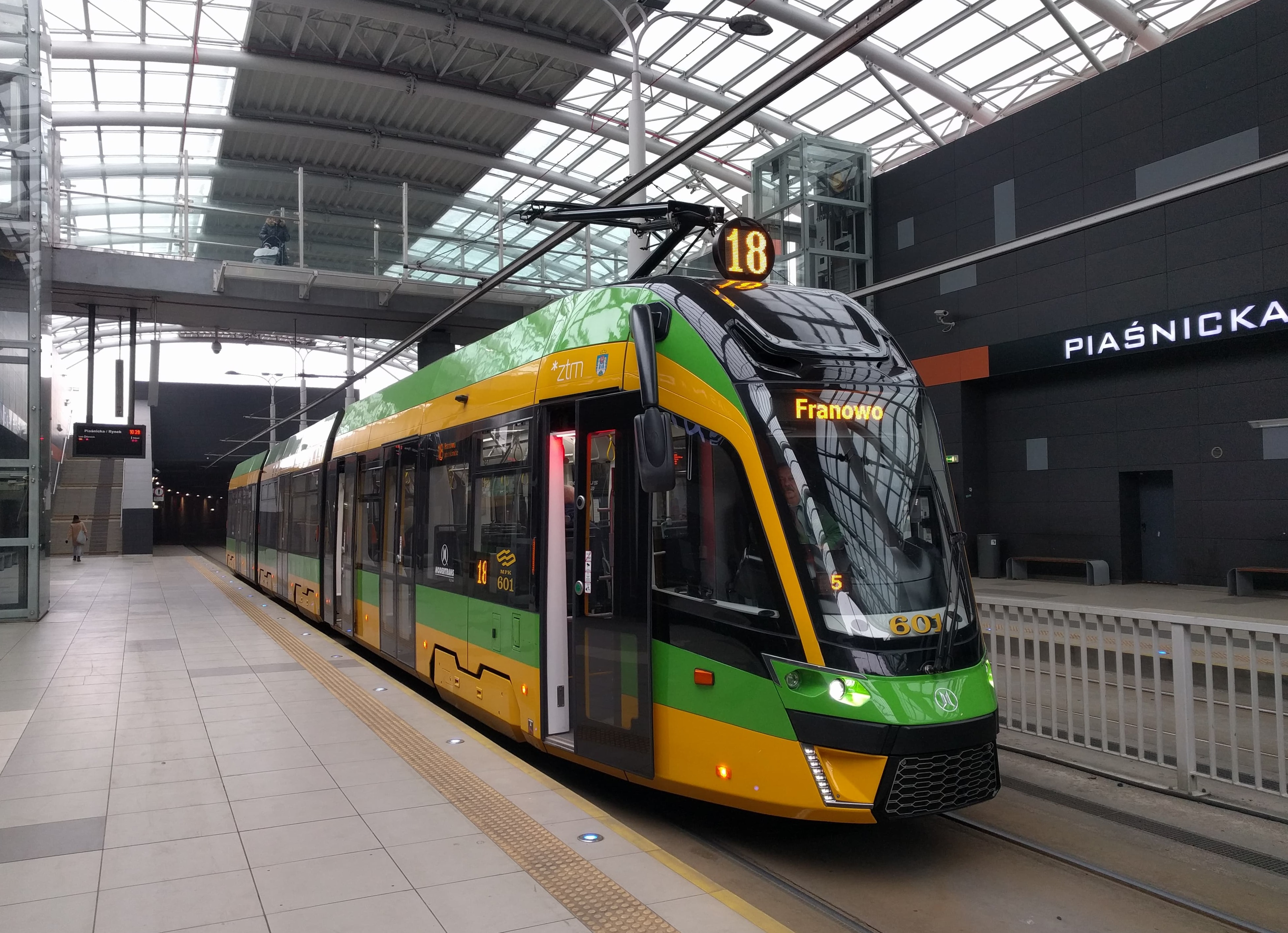
Moderus Gamma tram, which is produced near Poznań.

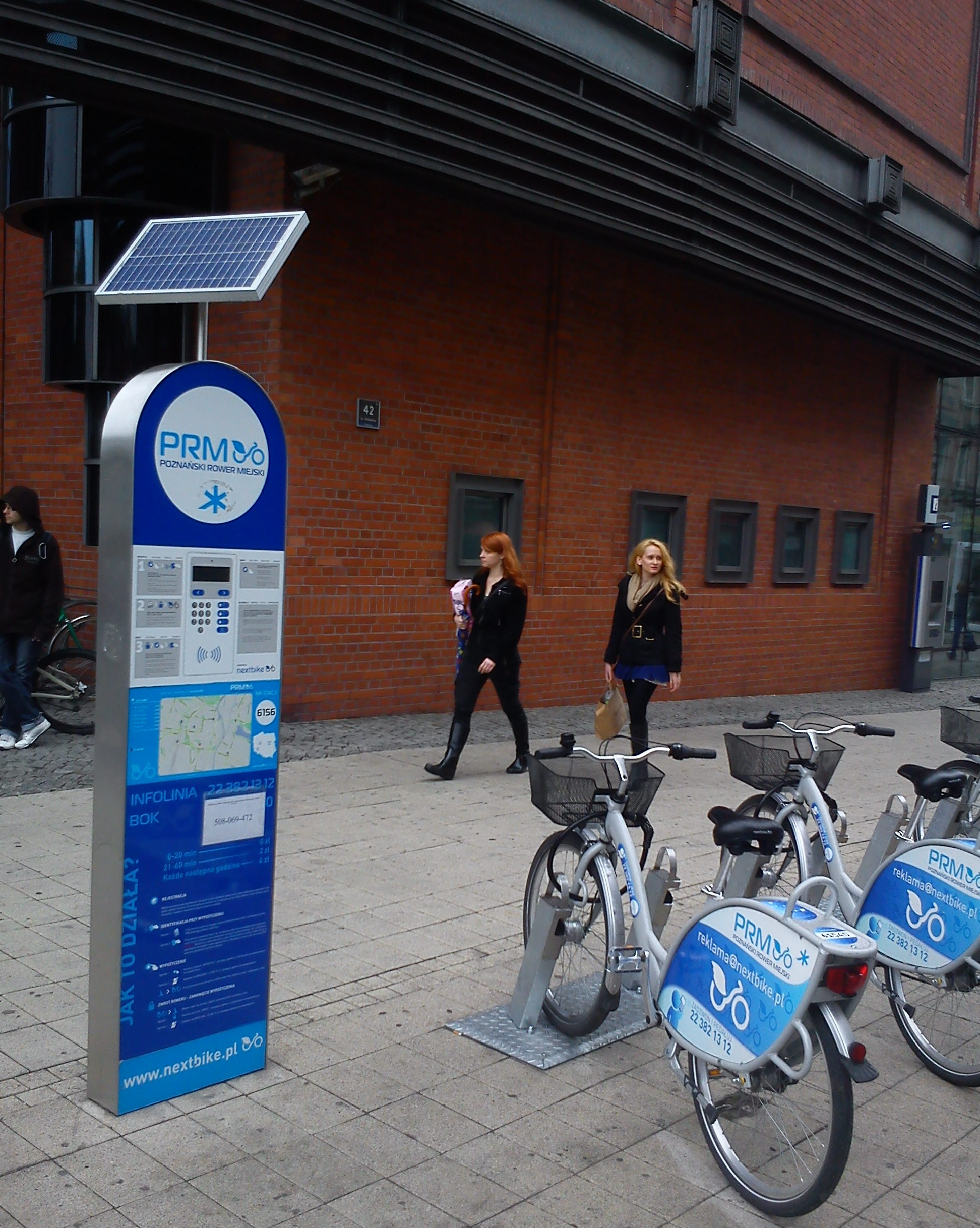
City Bike's station.

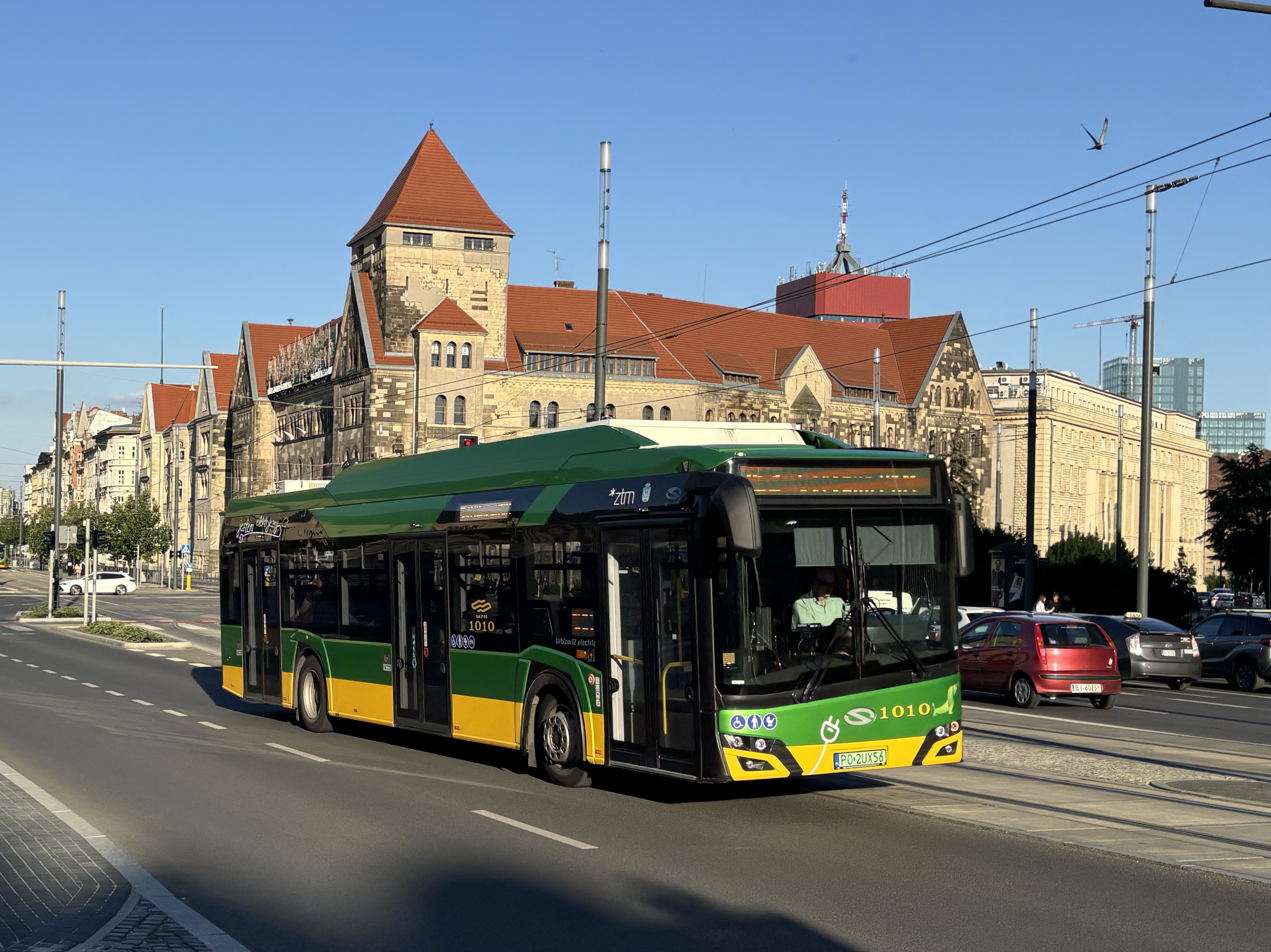
A short model of Solaris buses which are also produced near Poznań.

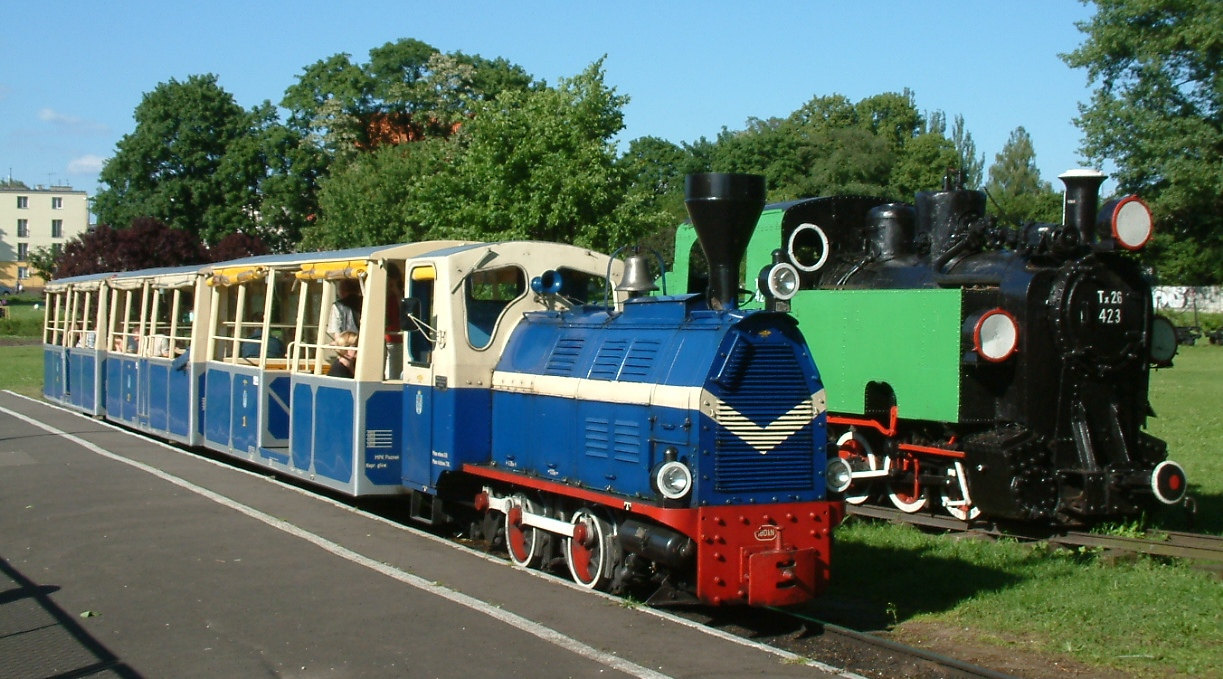
Maltanka

== International relations ==
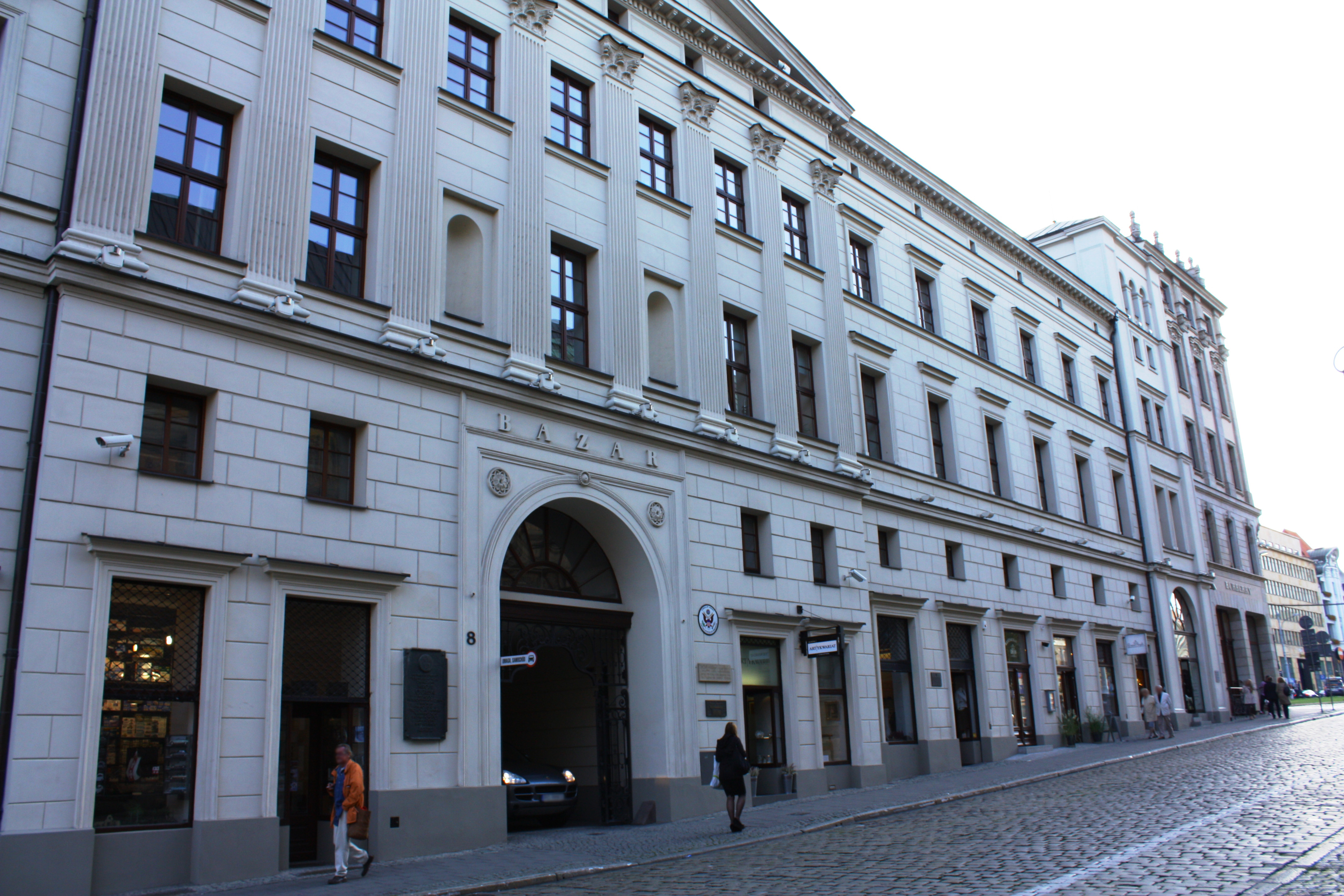
Consular Agency of the United States

One of the two principal and five total cemeteries of the Commonwealth War Graves Commission in Poland is located in Poznań, with more than 400 burials from both world wars.

=== Consulates ===
There is a consular agency of the United States, and 18 honorary consulates in Poznań – Armenia, Austria, Belgium, Croatia, Czech Republic, Estonia, Finland, France, Germany, Guatemala, Hungary, Ireland, Luxembourg, Mexico, Peru, Portugal, Turkey, Slovakia.

=== Twin towns – Sister cities ===
Poznań is twinned with:

- Assen, Drenthe, Netherlands, since 1992
- Brno, South Moravia, Czech Republic, since 1966
- Kharkiv, Sloboda Ukraine, Ukraine, since 1998
- Győr, Western Transdanubia, Hungary, since 2008
- Hannover, Lower Saxony, Germany, since 1979
- (United Kingdom) Nottinghamshire, England, since 1994
- Jyväskylä, Finnish Lakeland, Central Finland, Finland, since 1979
- (Georgia (country)) Kutaisi, Imereti, Georgia, since 2009
- Nablus, West Bank, Palestine, since 1997
- Pozuelo de Alarcón, Community of Madrid, Spain, since 1992
- Ra'anana, Central District, Sharon Plain, Israel, since 2010
- Rennes, Brittany, France, since 1998
- Shenzhen, Guangdong, China, since 1993
- Toledo, Ohio, United States, since 1991
- Bay City, Michigan, United States, since 1977
- São José dos Pinhais, Paraná, Brazil,

== See also ==
- Tourism in Poland
- History of Poland
- Royal coronations in Poland including in Poznań cathedral
- Poznań Fortress
- New Synagogue
- The Poznań
- 15th Poznań Uhlans Regiment

== Bibliography ==
- Frieder Monzer: Posen, Thorn, Bromberg (mit Großpolen, Kujawien und Südostpommern), Trescher Reiseführer, Berlin 2011
- Gotthold Rhode: Geschichte der Stadt Posen, Neuendettelsau 1953
- Collective work, Poznań. Dzieje, ludzie kultura, Poznań 1953
- Robert Alvis, Religion and the Rise of Nationalism: A Profile of an East-Central European City, Syracuse University Press, Syracuse 2005
- K. Malinowski (red.), Dziesięć wieków Poznania (in three volumes), Poznań 1956
- Collective work, Poznań, Poznań 1958
- Collective work, Poznań. Zarys historii, Poznań 1963
- Cz. Łuczak, Życie społeczno-gospodarcze w Poznaniu 1815–1918, Poznań 1965
- J. Topolski (red.), Poznań. Zarys dziejów, Poznań 1973
- Zygmunt Boras, Książęta Piastowscy Wielkopolski, Wydawnictwo Poznańskie, Poznań 1983
- Jerzy Topolski (red.), Dzieje Poznania, Wydawnictwo PWN, Warszawa, Poznań 1988
- Alfred Kaniecki, Dzieje miasta wodą pisane, Wydawnictwo Aquarius, Poznań 1993
- Witold Maisel (red.), Przywileje miasta Poznania XIII-XVIII wieku. Privilegia civitatis Posnaniensis saeculorum XIII-XVIII. Władze Miasta Poznania, Poznańskie Towarzystwo Przyjaciół Nauk, Wydawnictwa Żródłowe Komisji Historycznej, Tom XXIV, Wydawnictwo PTPN, Poznań 1994
- Wojciech Stankowski, Wielkopolska, Wydawnictwo WSiP, Warszawa 1999
