= Old Market Square =

Old Market Square may refer to:

- Old Market Square, Bydgoszcz, oblong place in old town district of Bydgoszcz, Poland
- Old Market Square (Lviv), 12th-century town center in Lviv, Ukraine
- Old Market Square, Nottingham, open, pedestrianised city square in Nottingham, England
- Old Market Square, Potsdam, centrally located square in downtown Potsdam, Germany
- Old Market Square, Poznań, centermost neighborhood in Poznań, Poland

== See also ==
- Old Square (disambiguation)
- Old Town Square
- Plaza Vieja (disambiguation)
- Stary Rynek (disambiguation)
