= Plaza Vieja =

Plaza Vieja may refer to:

- Plaza Vieja, Havana, Cuba
- Plaza Vieja, La Rioja, Argentina
- Plaza Vieja (Villarrobledo), Spain

== See also ==
- Old Square (disambiguation)
- Old Market Square (disambiguation)
- Old Town Square
- Stary Rynek (disambiguation)
