= Stary Rynek =

Stary Rynek may refer to:

- Stary Rynek, Bydgoszcz
- Stary Rynek, Poznań
