= Old Square =

Old Square may refer to:

- Old Square, Birmingham
- Old Square, Bishkek
- Old Square, Havana
- Old Square (Villarrobledo)
- Old Square, Moscow

== See also ==
- Old Market Square (disambiguation)
- Old Town Square
- Plaza Vieja (disambiguation)
- Stary Rynek (disambiguation)
