= Tempel Synagogue (Lviv) =

Former synagogue in Lviv, Ukraine

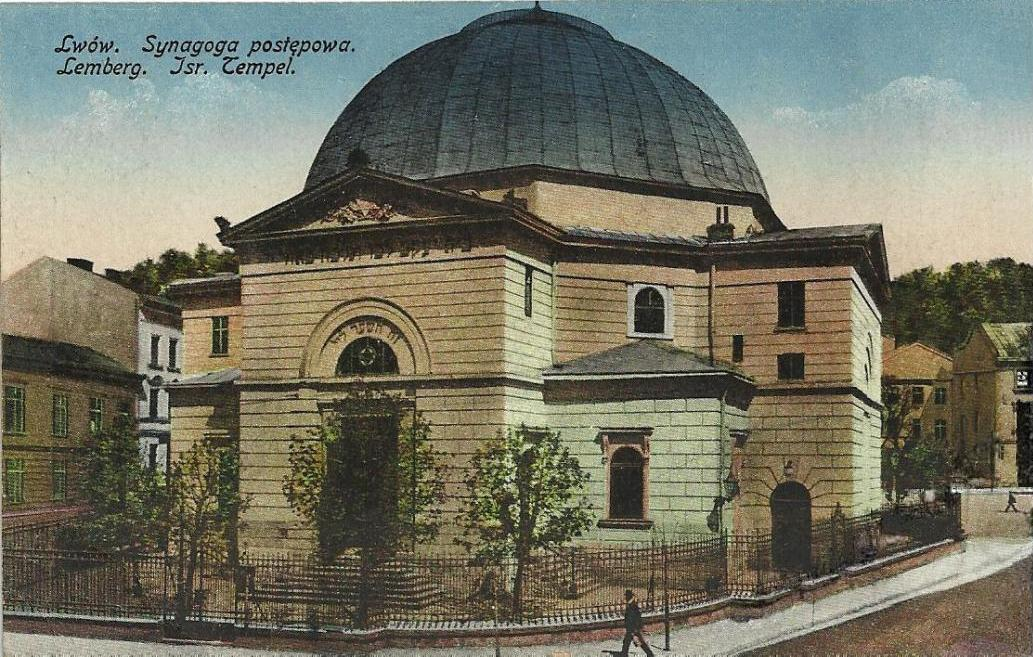
- Postcard of the former synagogue, c. 1917

- Location of the former synagogue, in what is now Ukraine

Religion
- Affiliation: Progressive Judaism (former)
- Ecclesiastical or organizational status: Synagogue (1845–1941)
- Status: Destroyed

Location
- Location: Old Market Square 14, Lviv
- Country: Ukraine
- Interactive map of Tempel Synagogue
- Coordinates: 49°50′47″N 24°01′47″E

Architecture
- Architect: Iwan Lewicki
- Type: Synagogue architecture
- Style: Baroque Revival
- Established: 1840
- Completed: 1846
- Destroyed: July 1941

Specifications
- Dome: One
- Materials: Stone and brick

Tempel Synagogue was a Progressive Jewish synagogue, located at the Old Market Square 14 (the historic Fish Market) in Lviv, at the time part of the Austro-Hungarian Empire; and, since 1991, now in Ukraine. Lviv was one of the first Galician cities to have a modernized synagogue. The synagogue was destroyed by Nazi Germany in 1941, following Operation Barbarossa.

== History ==
The first synagogue in Lviv, in the Orthodox tradition, was built in the 17th century.

A new synagogue, based on design by Iwan Lewicki, was constructed from 1844 to 1845. The synagogue was a Baroque Revival style building with a large dome, inspired by the Viennese Main Synagogue located at Seitenstattgasse 4. The interior sanctuary was round, with seating facing forward and the Bimah placed at the front of the seating area, near the Torah Ark in a moderately reformed style, again like in Vienna. Also in the modernized style was the elevated pulpit with an architectural canopy from which the rabbi preached the sermon in the vernacular (i.e., not in Yiddish.) A double tier of women's balconies ran around the perimeter of the room, old photographs reveal an elaborately decorated classical space reminiscent of the great opera houses of the era.

The first Rabbi, Abraham Kohn, was considered a staunch traditionalist in his native Bohemia. He refused to participate at the third Reform conference in Breslau, held in 1846, and argued that only a wall-to-wall rabbinical consensus would have sufficed to enact even moderate alterations in religious conduct. However, in the backward eastern province where Yiddish was still the Jewish vernacular and secular studies for rabbis were unheard of, Kohn immediately found himself at the position of an ultra-progressive. He was poisoned in 1848, under unknown circumstances. The strictly Orthodox Jews of Lemberg, who opposed even his modestly progressive attitude, were suspect but none was found guilty.

The longest serving Chairman was Ozjasz Wasser who served for over twenty years until 1939. Wasser was a Polish lawyer and prominent member and leader of the Jewish community in Lviv between World Wars I and II.

== Destruction and commemoration ==
The synagogue was destroyed by the Nazis in July 1941. The destruction was described by a former member of the congregation:

“The SS and the police planted thick loads of explosives at the great Progressive synagogue […] in the light from the fires, the Jews, tears in their eyes, watched […] the barbaric destruction of monuments of Jewish culture and history […]. With no regard for their own lives, people ran into the flaming temples to save the scrolls, the most sacred treasure. Shots fired by police guards put an end to the feat of the brave ones."

— Edmund Kessler, 2014.

A memorial stone and plaque was subsequently placed at the location of the synagogue, in both Ukrainian and English, that reads: "This is the site of the synagogue of the progressive Jews called "The Temple" which served Lviv's intelligentsia. It was built during 1844–1845 and was destroyed by German soldiers on entering to Lviv in July 1941." In 2018 it was reported that there were plans for a further memorial.

== Gallery ==
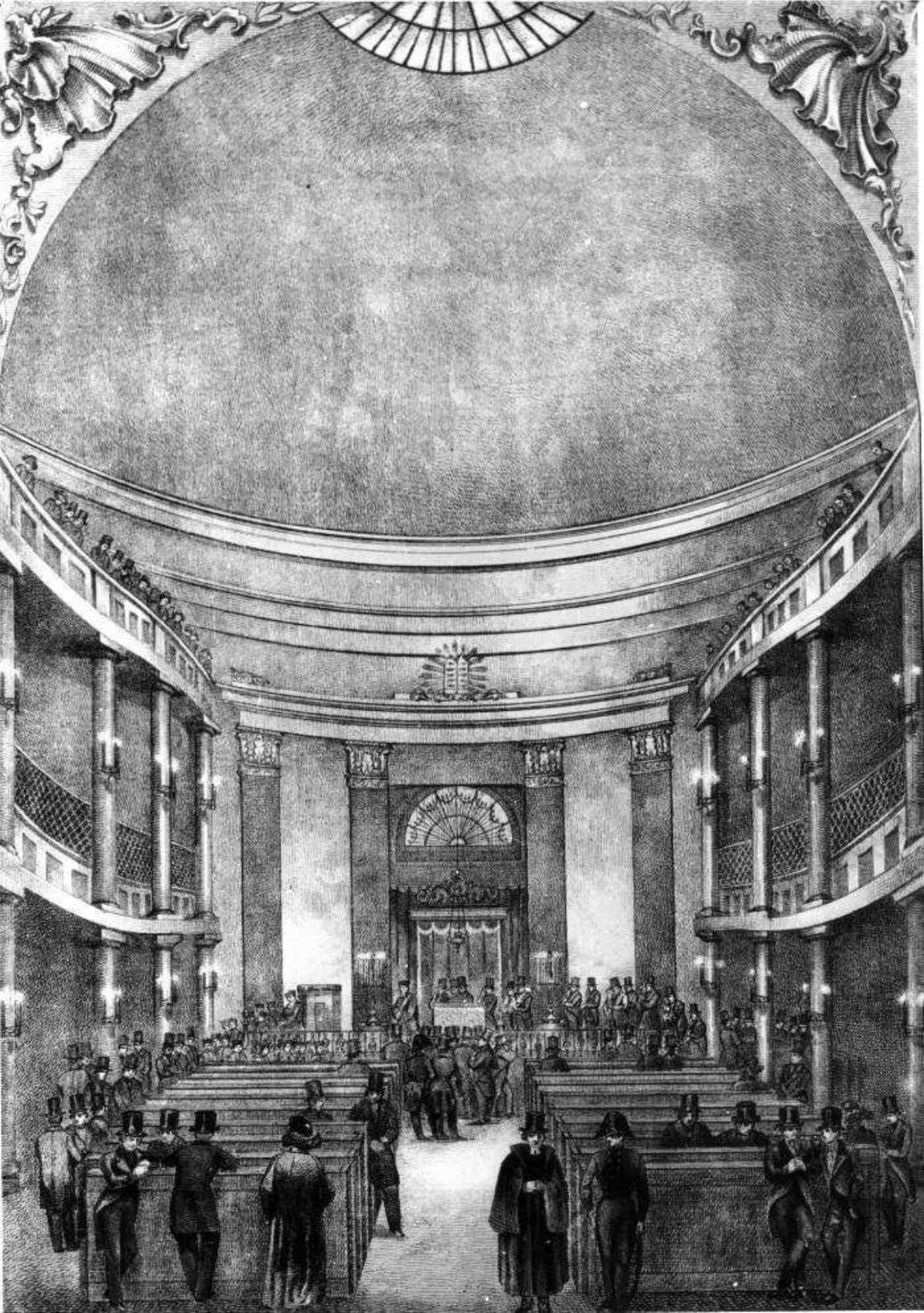
Lithograph of 1846

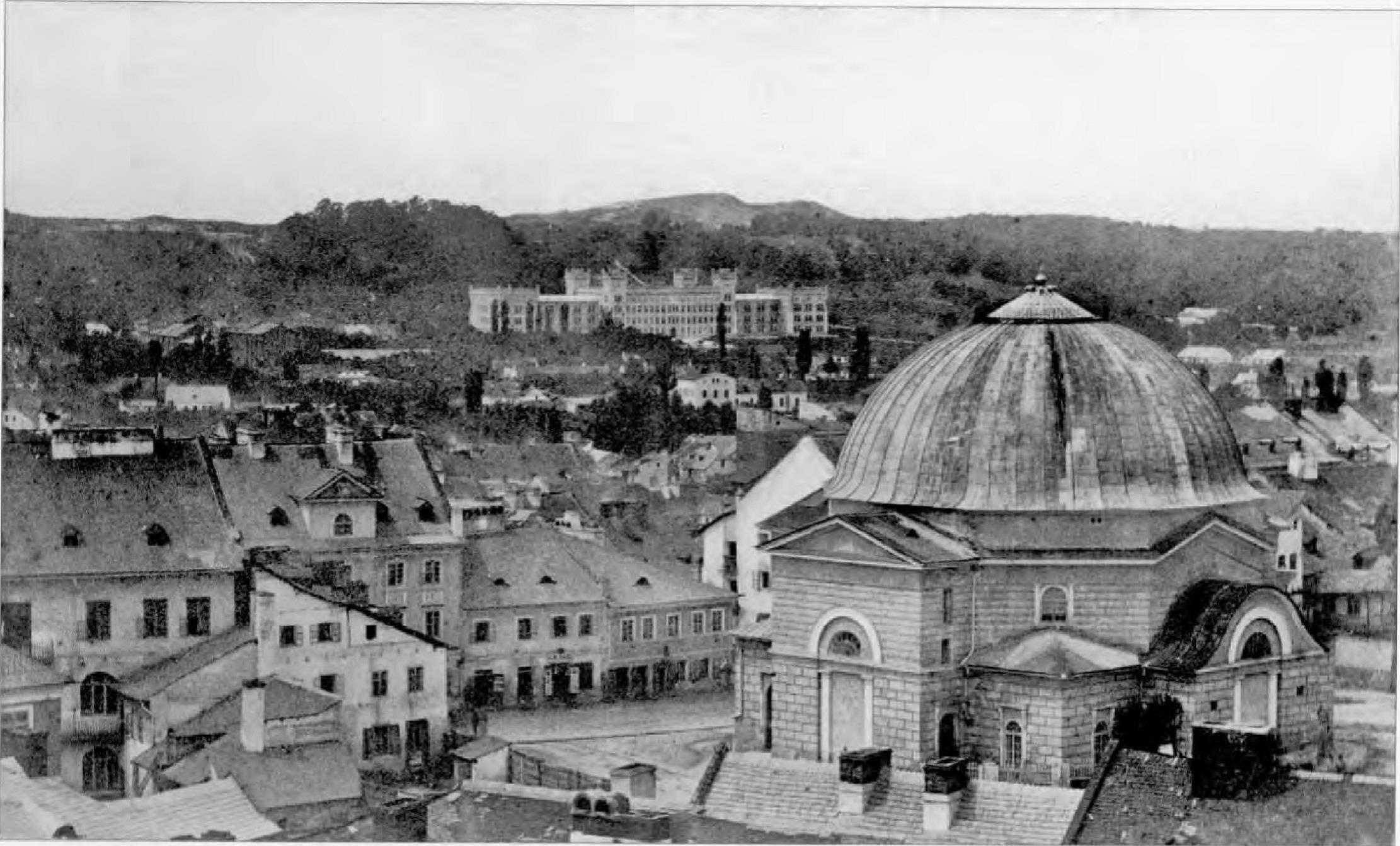
c. 1861-63

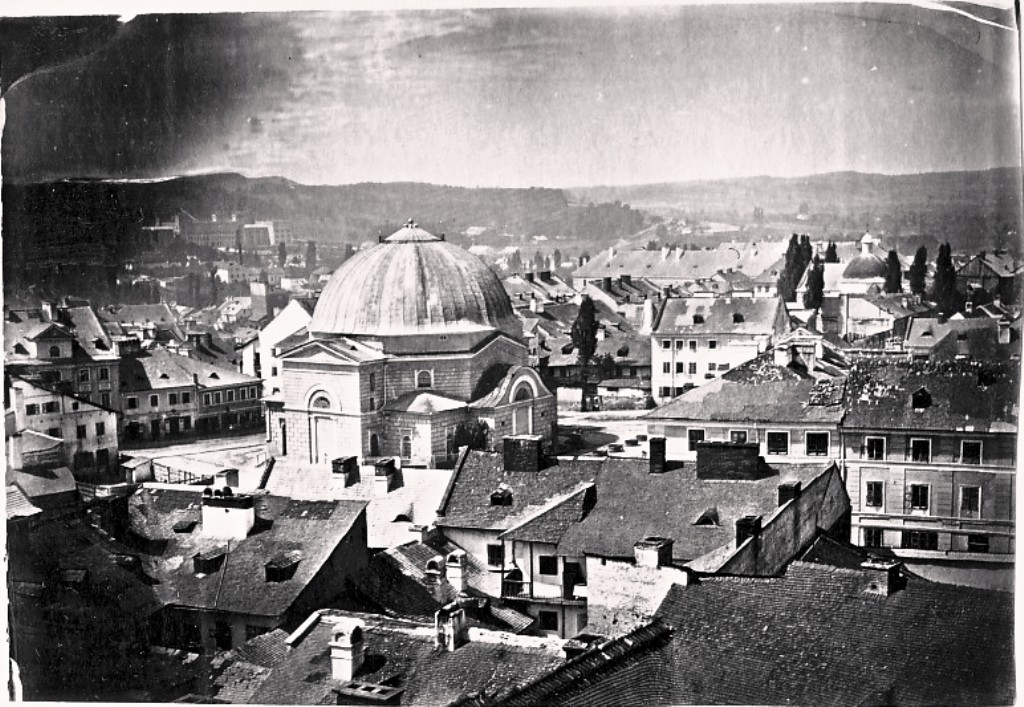
c. 1862

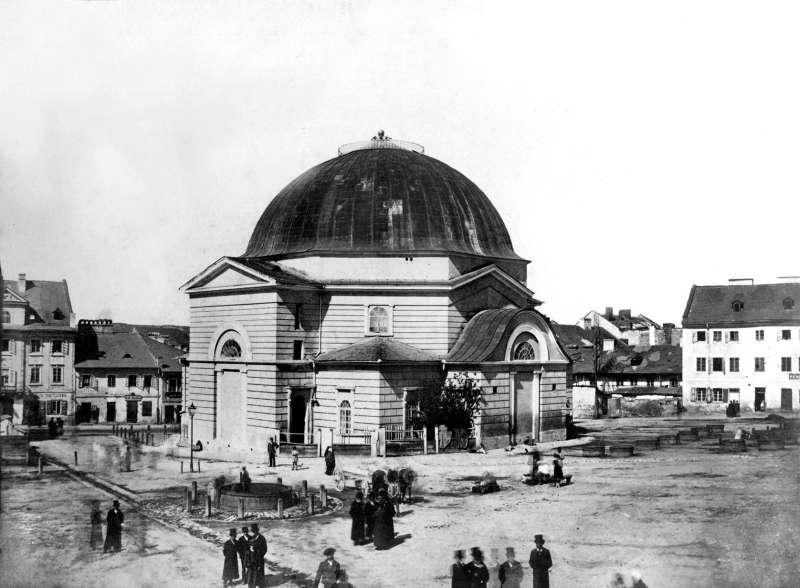
1863

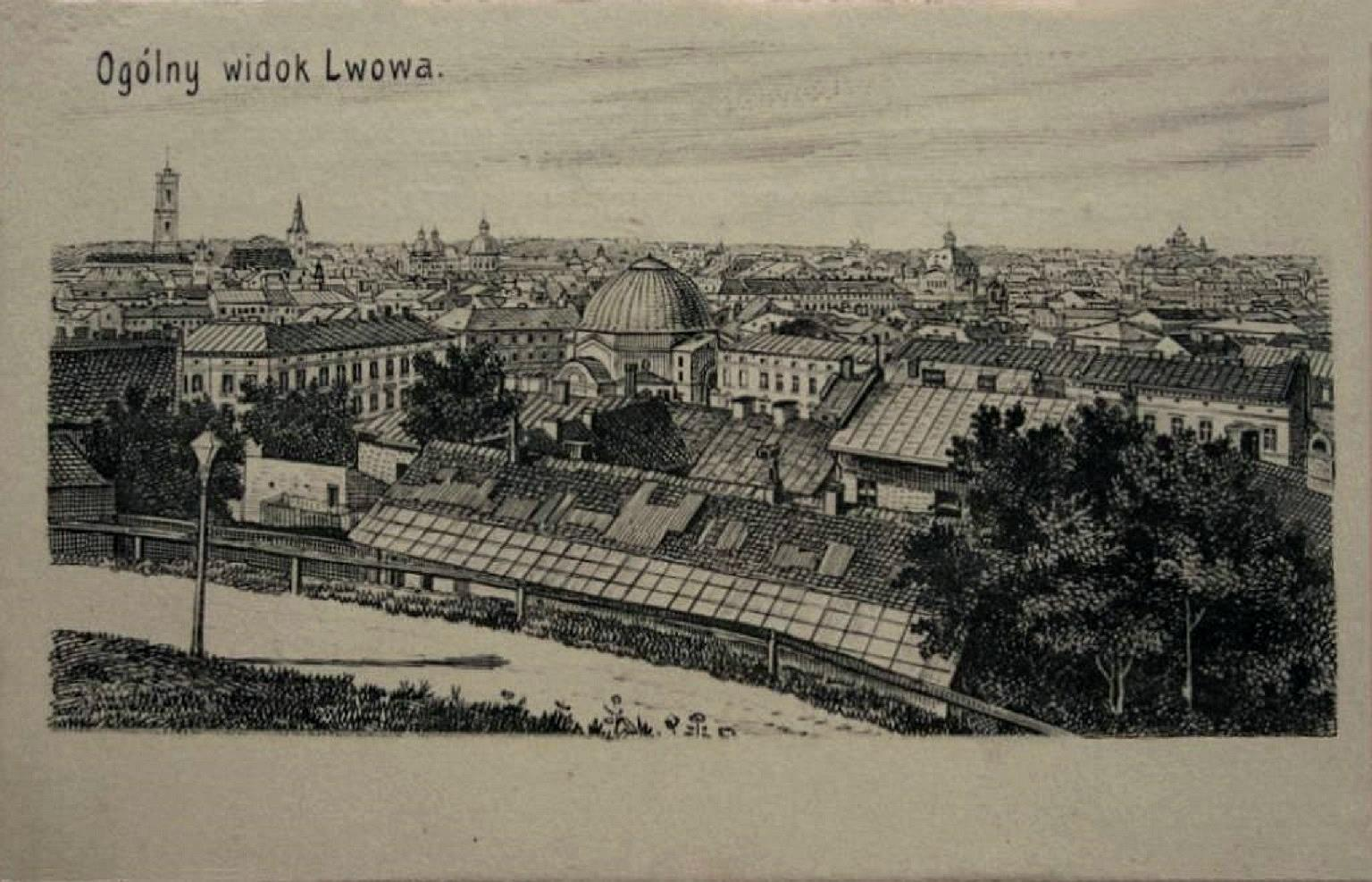
View with Tempel Synagogue, 1903

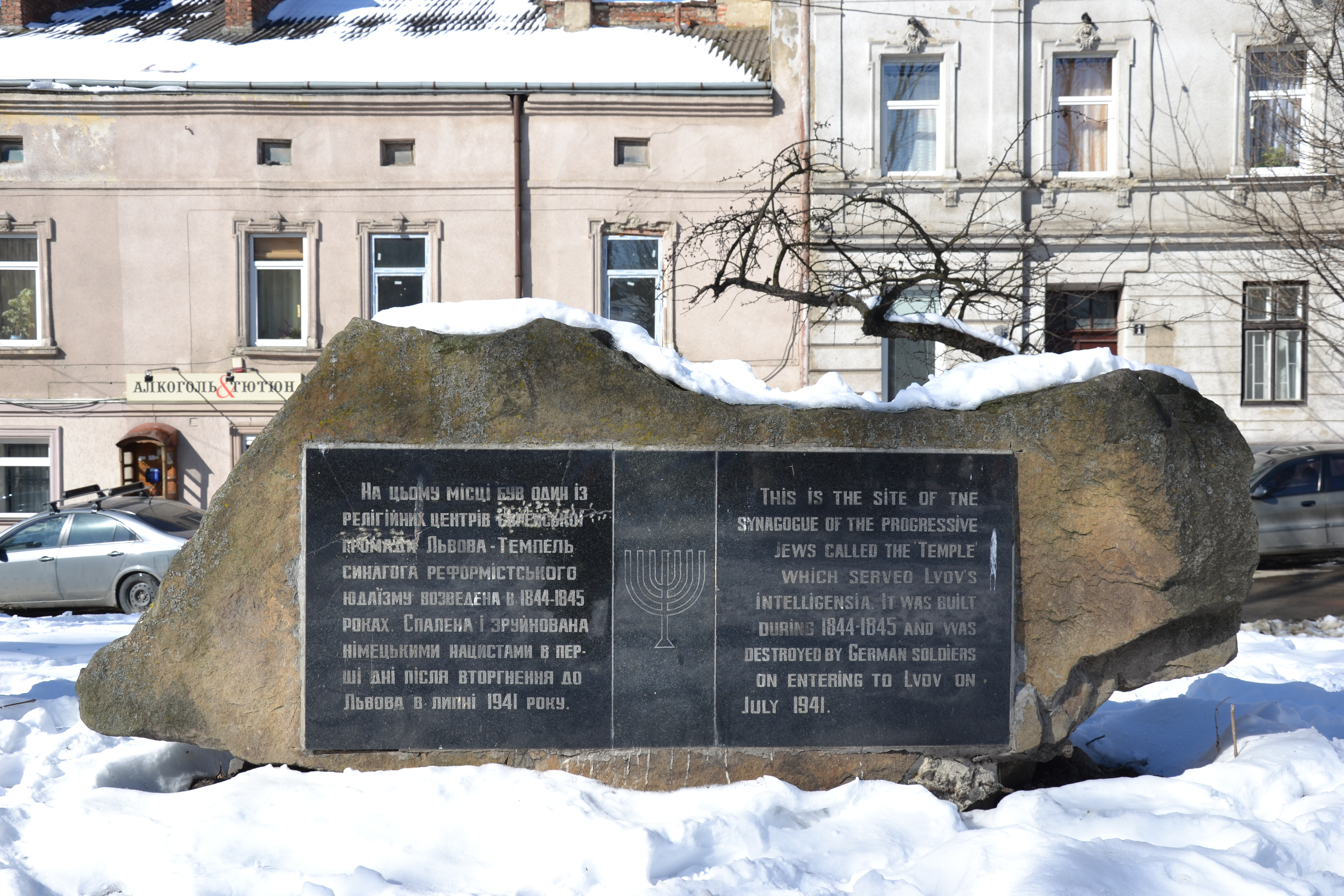
The plaque commemorating the synagogue, 2011

== See also ==
- History of the Jews in Ukraine
- Former synagogues in Ukraine
