= Old Market Square (Lviv) =

Square in Lviv, Ukraine

Old Market Square, Lviv
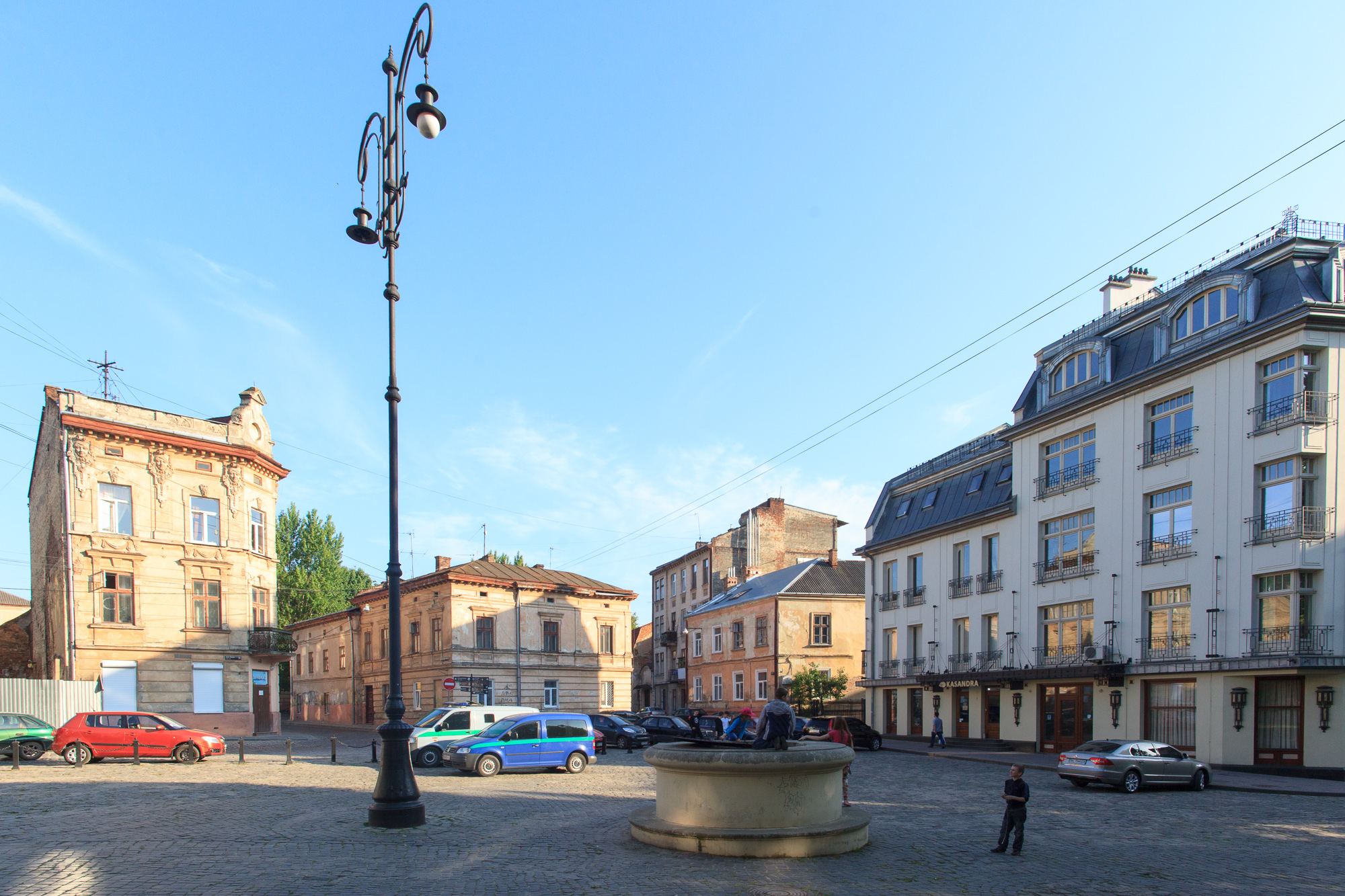
- Staryi Rynok
- Interactive map of Old Market Square, Lviv
- Type: Medieval market square
- Location: Lviv, Ukraine
- Coordinates: 49°50′46″N 24°01′47″E

Old Market Square (Ukrainian: Площа Старий Ринок, romanized: Ploshcha Staryi Rynok, Polish: Stary Rynek we Lwowie) is a square in Lviv, Ukraine. It is located north of the Market Square, along Bohdan Khmelnytsky street, in the vicinity of St. Nicholas Church. The area in which the square is situated constituted the town center during the earliest period of Lviv's history, when it was part of the Galician-Volhynian state.

== Notable buildings ==
- Tempel Synagogue, destroyed in 1941
- Former St. John the Baptist Roman Catholic Church, now the Museum of Historic Artifacts of Lviv
