= Pranger of Poznań =

Monument in Poland

Coordinates: 52°24′30″N 16°56′4″E

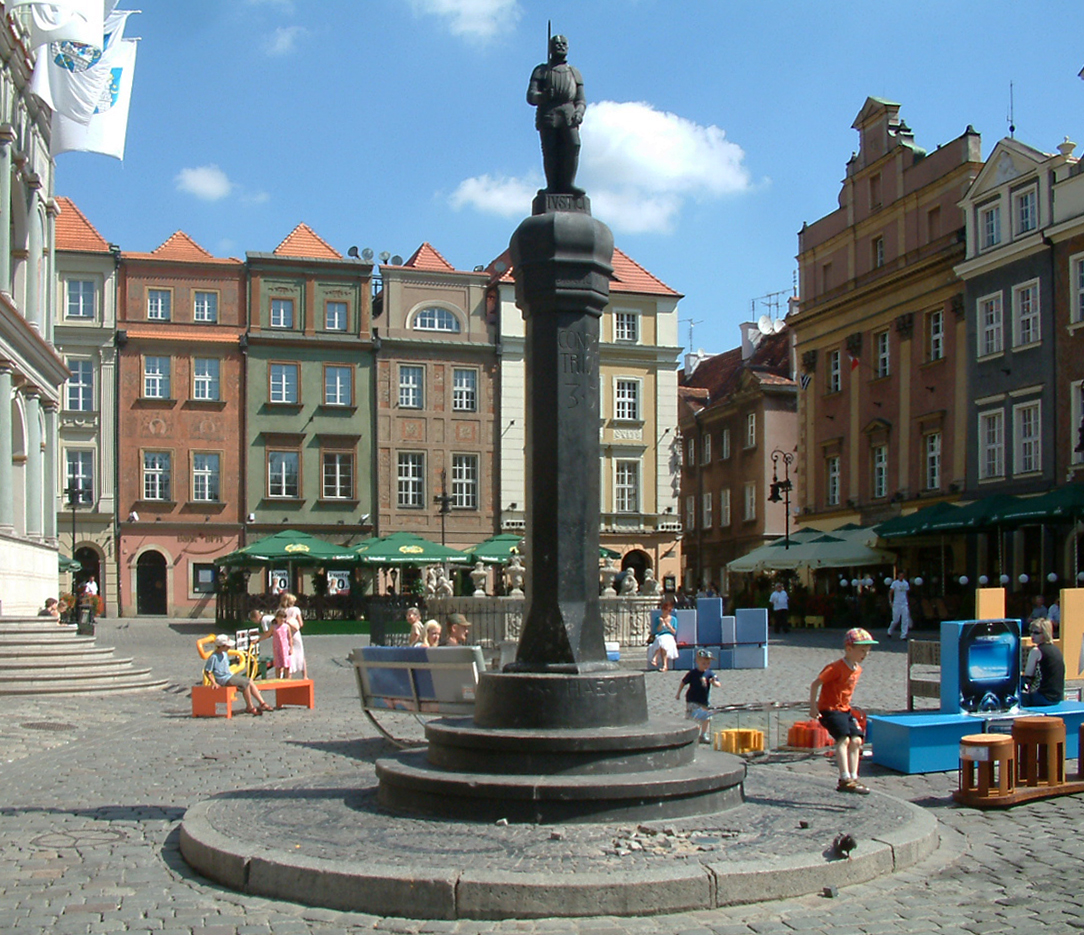
Pranger in Poznań

The Pranger of Poznań is found near the north-east corner of the Town Hall, not far from the Prozerpina Fountain. It is an eight-sided, late-Gothic column, on the summit of which stands a statue of an executioner in a Crusader's outfit holding a raised sword. The current pranger is a copy made by Marcin Rożek in 1925. The original is in the Museum of History of Poznań in the town hall. The pranger was constructed in 1535, financed by fines extracted from workers who wore too-elaborate outfits. The pranger was used to exact punishment through flagellation or the removal of ears or fingers.
