= Old Market Square, Poznań =

Central market in Poznań, Poland

Coordinates: 52.4083°N 16.9336°E

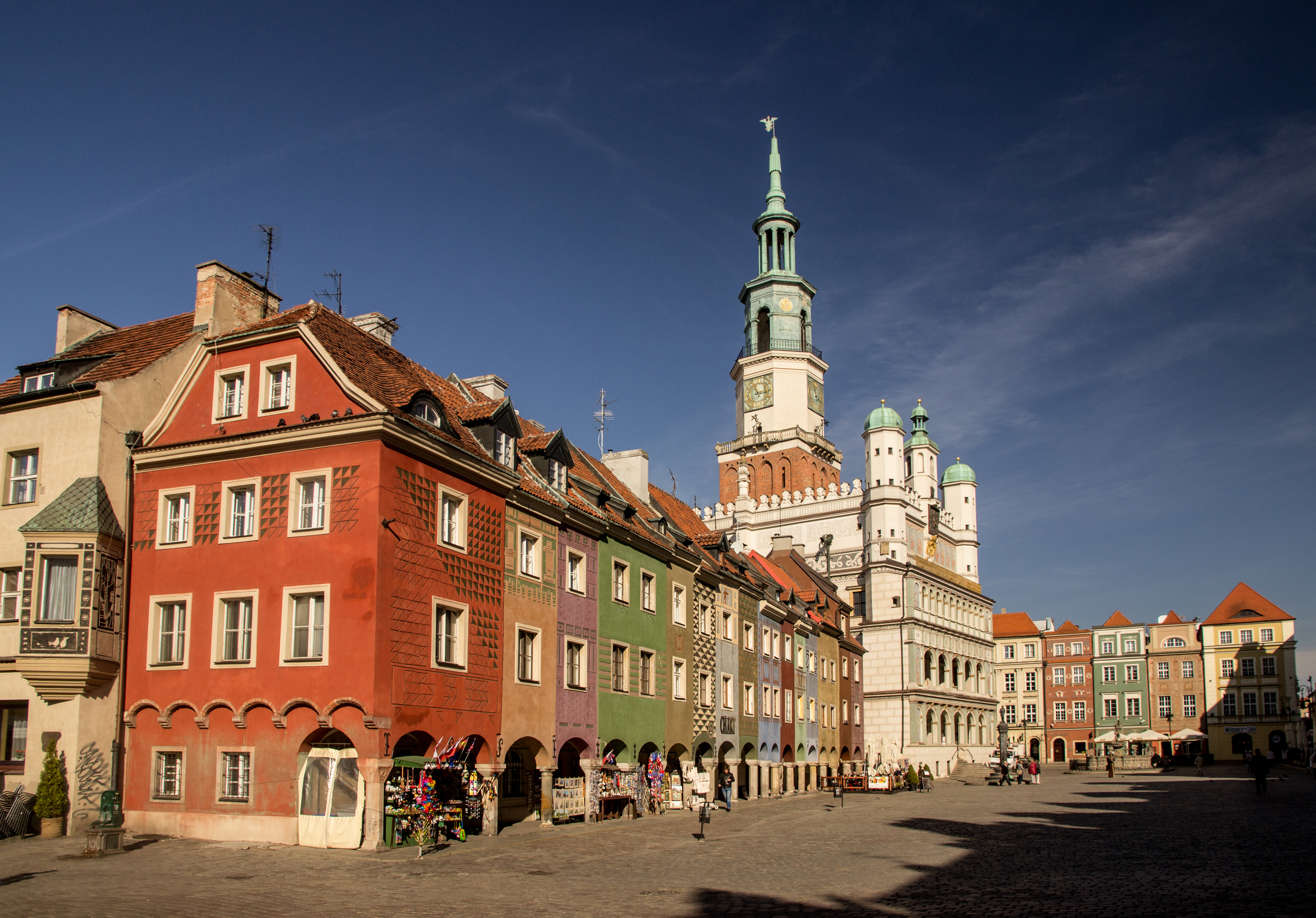
View of the Old Market Square and the Poznań Town Hall

Old Market Place (Polish: Stary Rynek) is the center and oldest part of the Old Town of Poznań, Poland. This market is the third largest market square in Poland, after Main Square in Kraków, and Market Square in Wrocław.

== History ==
The original settlement of Poznań was on the river island of Ostrów Tumski, and dates from at least the 9th century. The Old Town neighbourhood, however, corresponds to the city on the left bank of the Warta, to the west of Ostrów Tumski, which received its charter in 1253 (work on the Royal Castle, which would be at the western side of the ring of walls, began several years earlier).

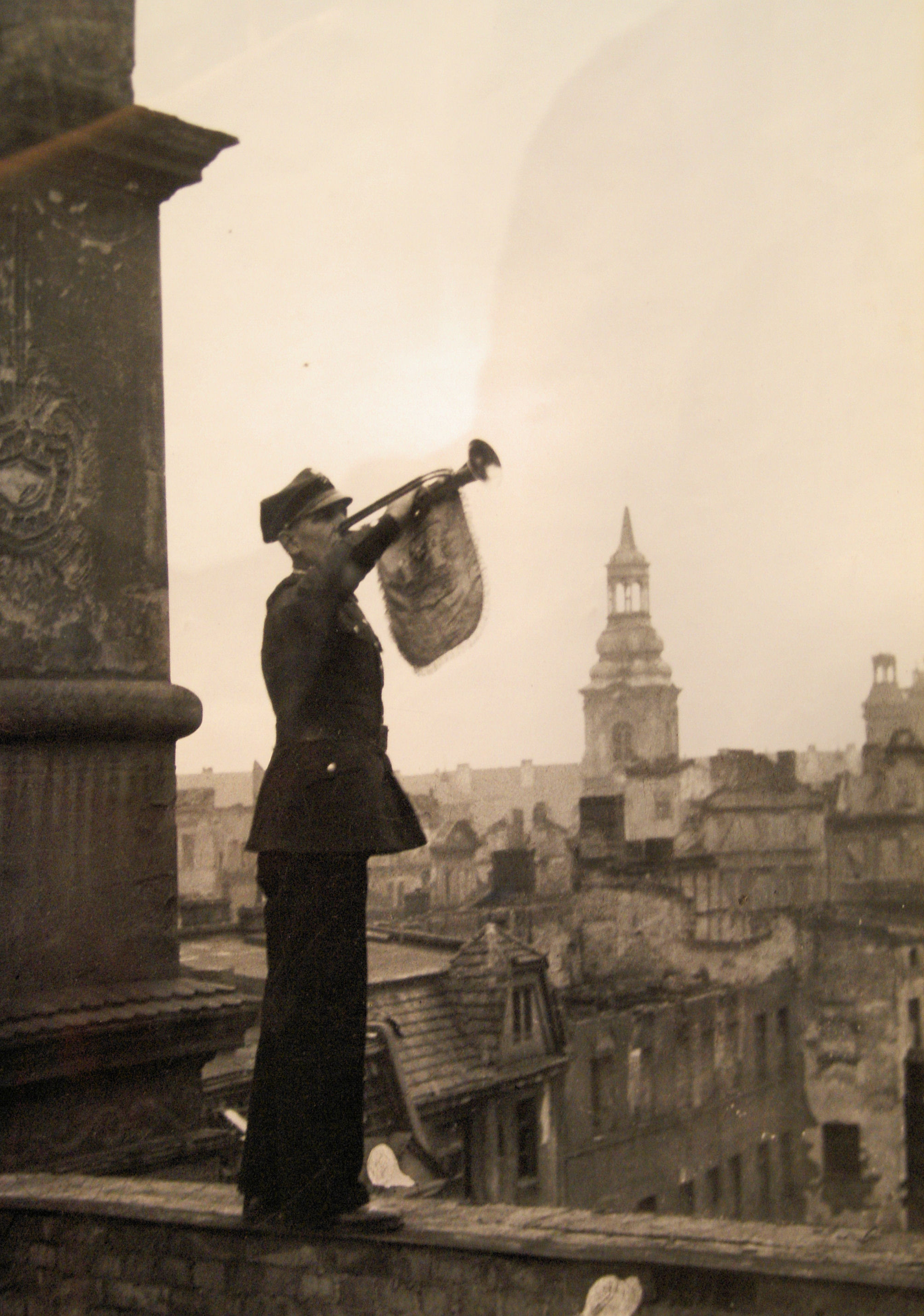
Hejnał of the City Hall

The Old Market Square (Stary Rynek) is the large square on which the Old Town neighbourhood is centred. The sides of the square measure approximately 140 metres (460 ft). There is a group of buildings in the central part of the square, chief of which is the Old Town Hall (Ratusz). On each side of the square are tall rows of former tenement houses (kamienice), many of which are now used as restaurants, cafés and pubs (often with outdoor tables on the square itself). The square was originally laid out in around 1253, with each side divided into 16 equal plots, and many changes to architectural layout and style were made over the centuries. Major changes were made from 1550 onwards by Giovanni Battista di Quadro, who reconstructed the Town Hall and several other buildings in Renaissance style (severe damage had been done to the buildings by a fire of 1536). Most of the buildings in the square were reconstructed following heavy damage in the Battle of Poznań (1945).

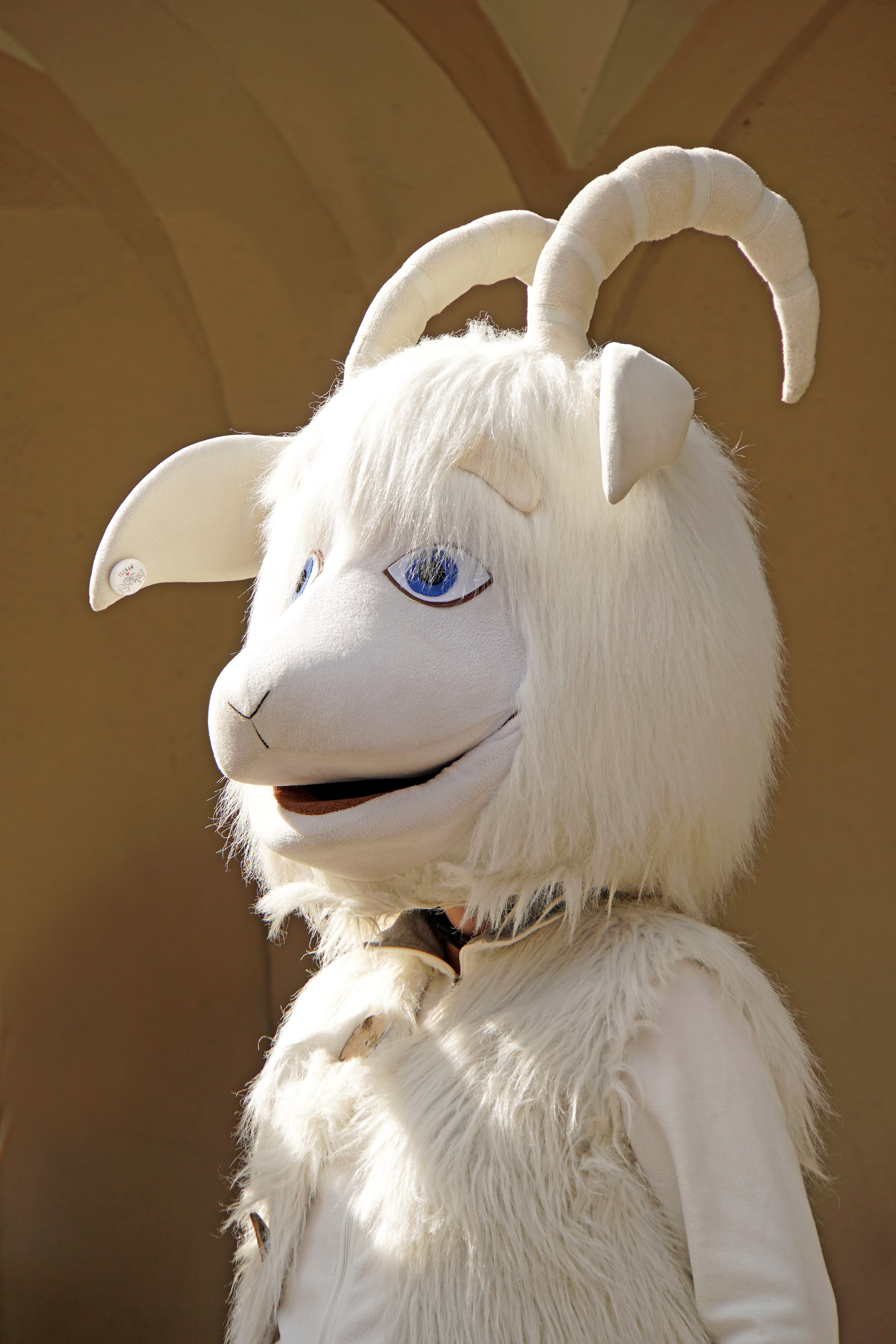
Poznań Goat mascot, Old Market Square

== Buildings ==
Old Market Square

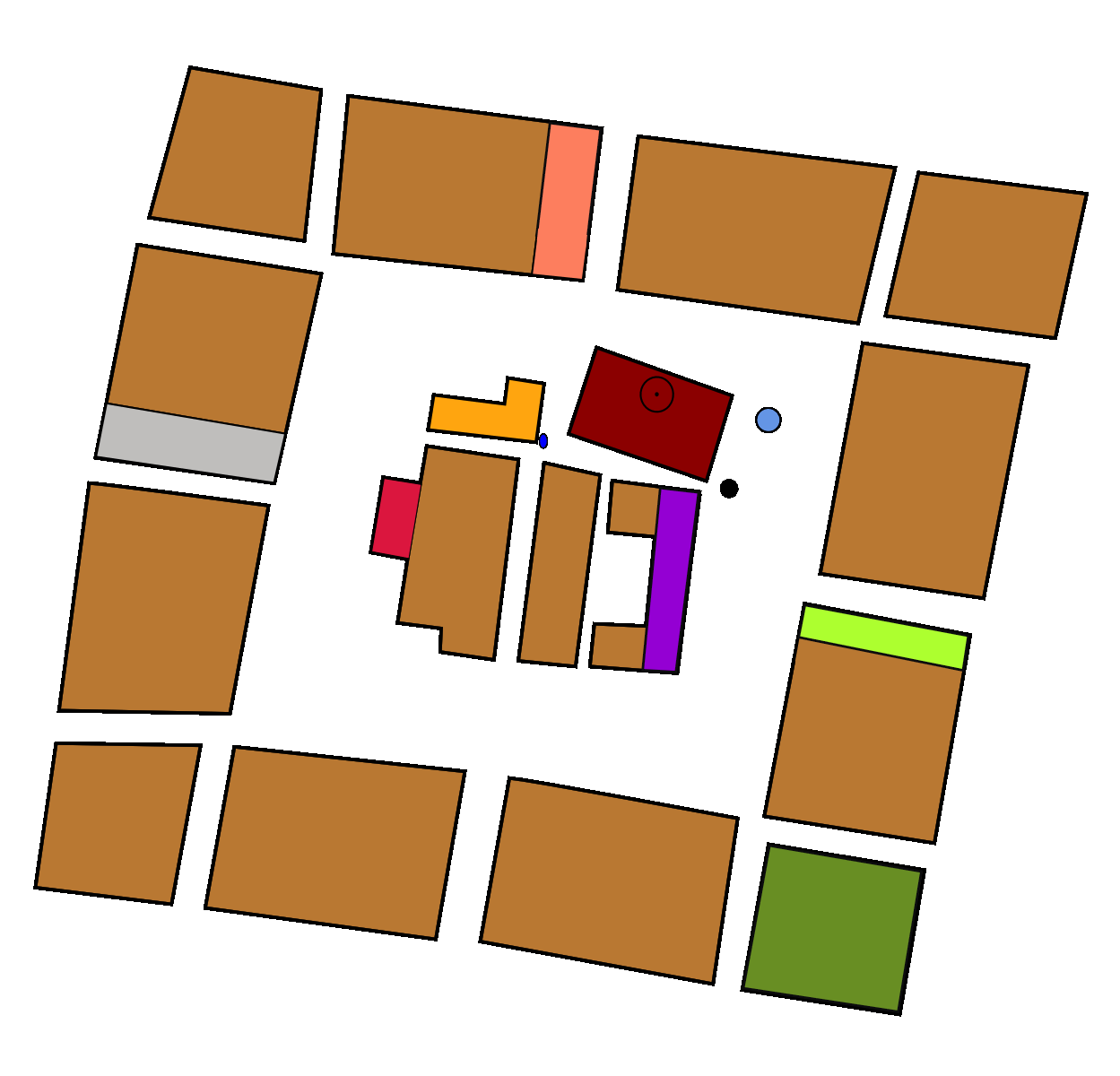

Legend
City Hall
Weighing house
Merchants' houses
Guardhouse
Działyński Palace
Górków Palace
Museum of Musical Instruments
Fountain of Proserpina
Bamberka Monument
Pranger of Poznań

The central group of buildings includes:

- The Old Town Hall (see separate article), standing in the northeast corner of the central building group (facing east).
- A row of merchants' houses (domki budnicze), dating from the 16th century, painted in a multicoloured design (1953–1961), with an arcade containing souvenir stalls, facing east. One of the houses (no. 17) displays the coat of arms – a herring and three palms – of the merchants' guild from which the houses take their name.
- The former town chancellery, adjoining the merchants' houses, facing south.
- The old town weighing house (Waga Miejska), behind the Town Hall, facing north. This was first built 1532–1534, reconstructed 1563, demolished as unsafe in 1890 (replaced by a Renaissance-style "New Town Hall" used by the city government, heavily damaged in 1945), rebuilt in its former style in 1950–1960 based on surviving prints, renovated in 2002, now used for weddings and other functions.
- The guardhouse (Odwach), facing west, originally an 18th-century wooden building, rebuilt in Classical style in 1783–1787, heavily damaged in 1945, rebuilt 1949–1951 and used as a museum. It now houses a museum dedicated to the Greater Poland Uprising (1918–1919).
- The Arsenał gallery, a postwar building (1959–1962), standing on the site of a former market building which was used as an arsenal from the 17th century, and was destroyed in 1945.
- The Wielkopolska Military Museum, a modern building (1959–1962) standing on the site of a former cloth hall (sukiennice). The cloth hall existed from 1386 (reconstructed in 1563) until it was converted into houses in the 19th century (destroyed in World War II).

Notable houses among those around the edge of the square include:

- nos. 45, 46 and 47 on the east side of the square, which house a Museum of Musical Instruments.
- no. 48, a reconstructed Gothic building, behind which archaeologists have discovered the remains of a late 13th-century merchant's house, the oldest known brick building in the left-bank city, which probably belonged to the city's founder, Thomas of Guben.
- no. 50, a reconstructed late-Gothic building, on whose wall is a plaque showing the maximum water level during the city's worst ever flood in 1736.
- no. 78 on the west side, known as the Działyński Palace.
- no. 91 on the north side, known as the Mielżyński Palace.

Other features of the square are a punishment post ("pranger", Polish pręgierz) and a fountain depicting Proserpina, on the eastern side in front of the Town Hall; a statue of St. John Nepomucene; and fountains depicting the gods Apollo, Neptune and Mars. Within the central group of buildings is a water fountain depicting a Bamber woman (Bamberka). The Pranger of Poznań is located near the north-east corner of the Poznan City Hall.

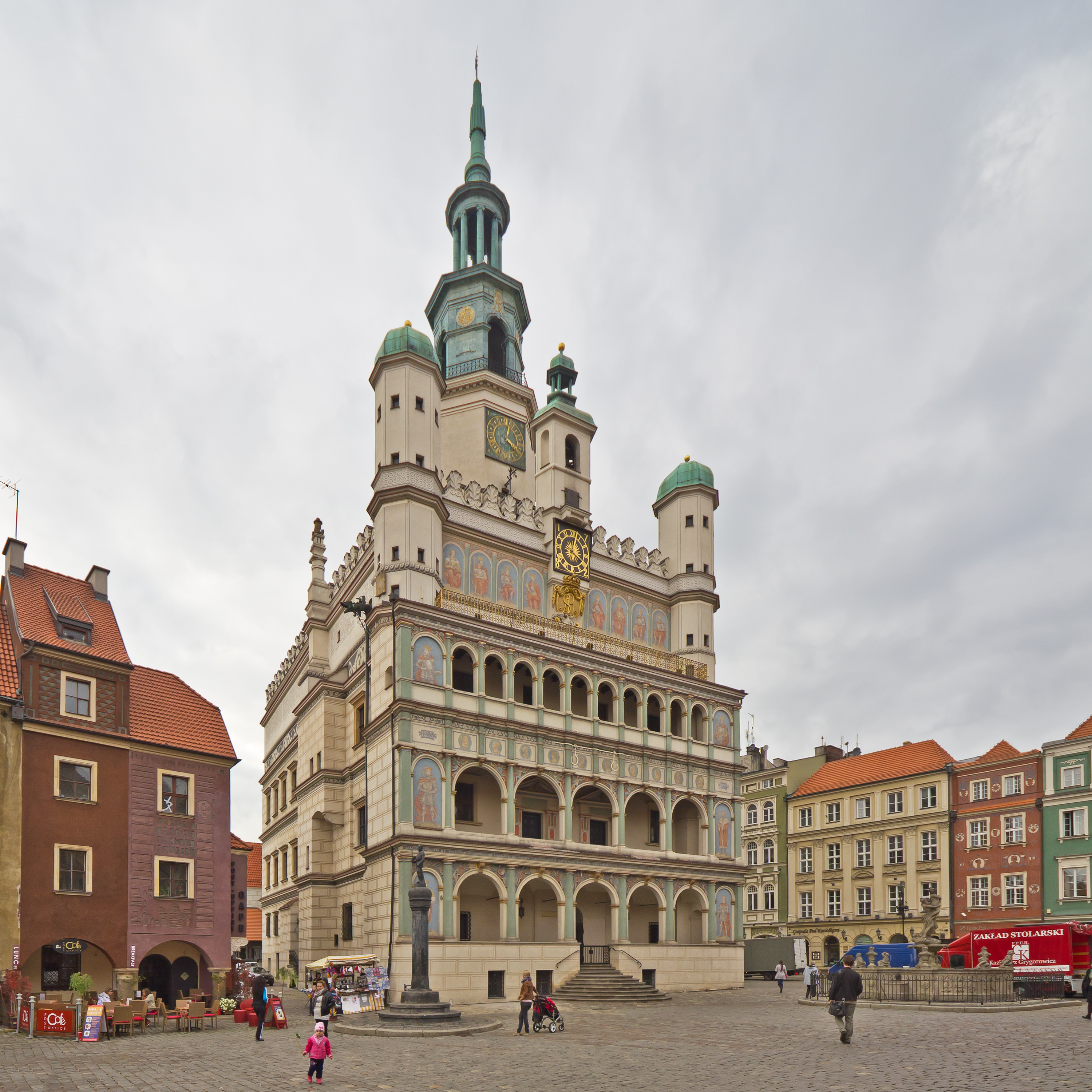
Town Hall

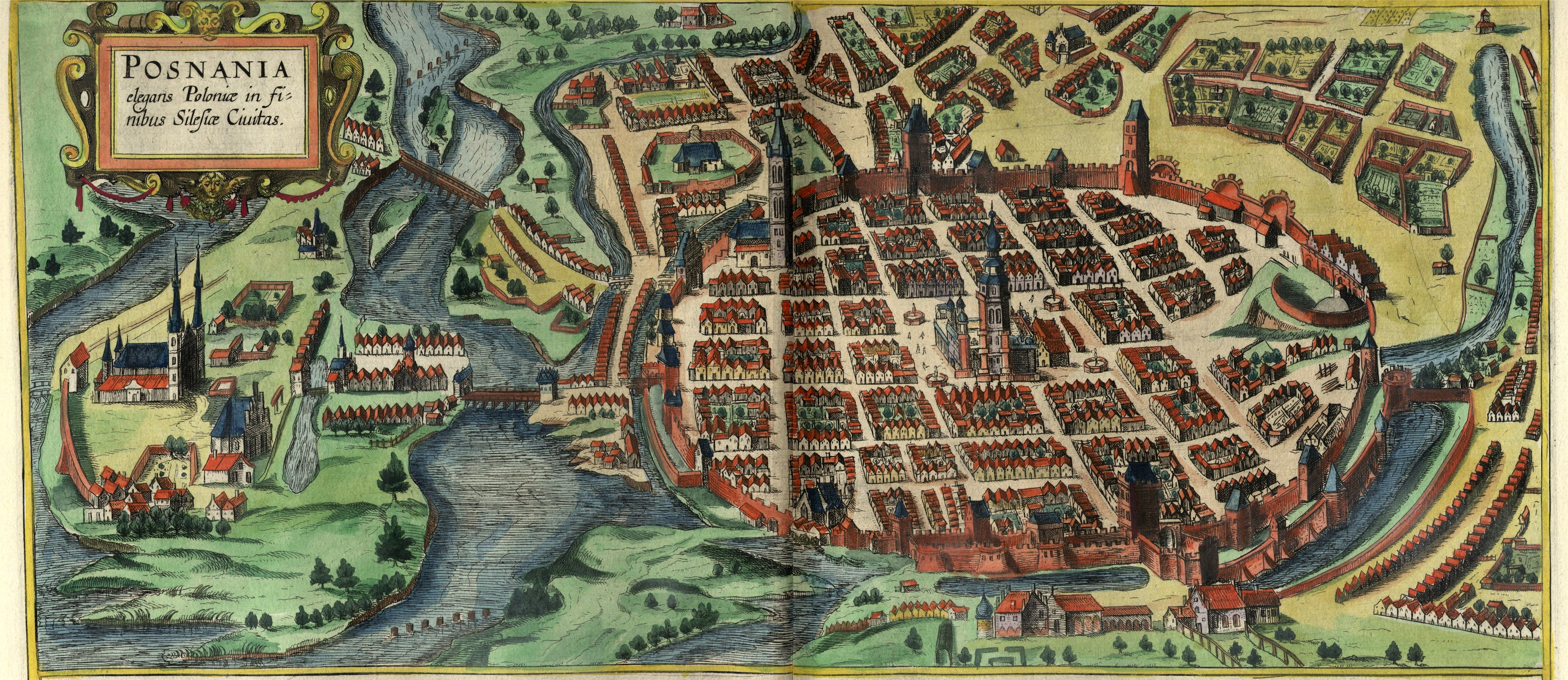
Poznań, 1618 from Civitates Orbis Terrarum

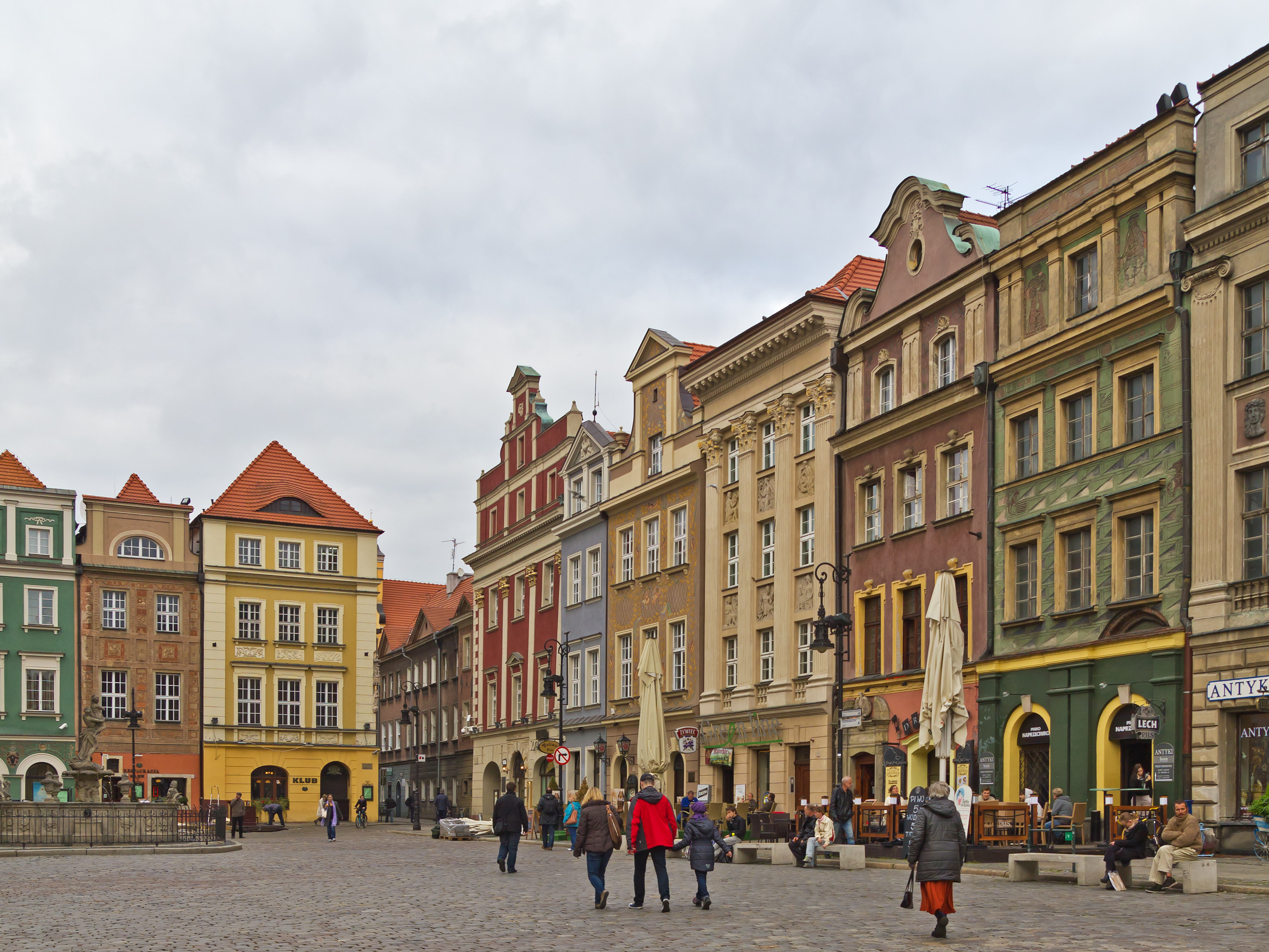
Merchants' houses

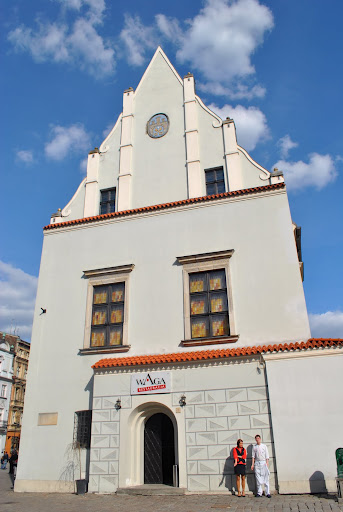
Weighing house

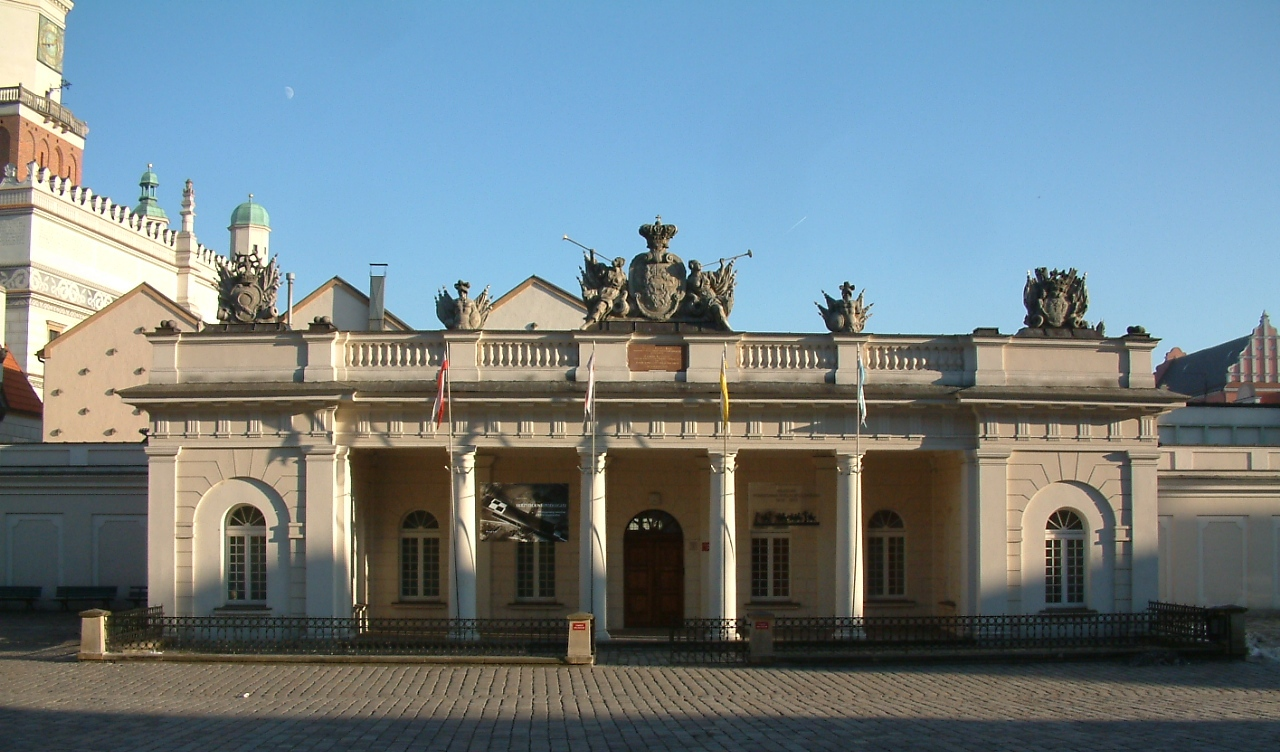
Guardhouse

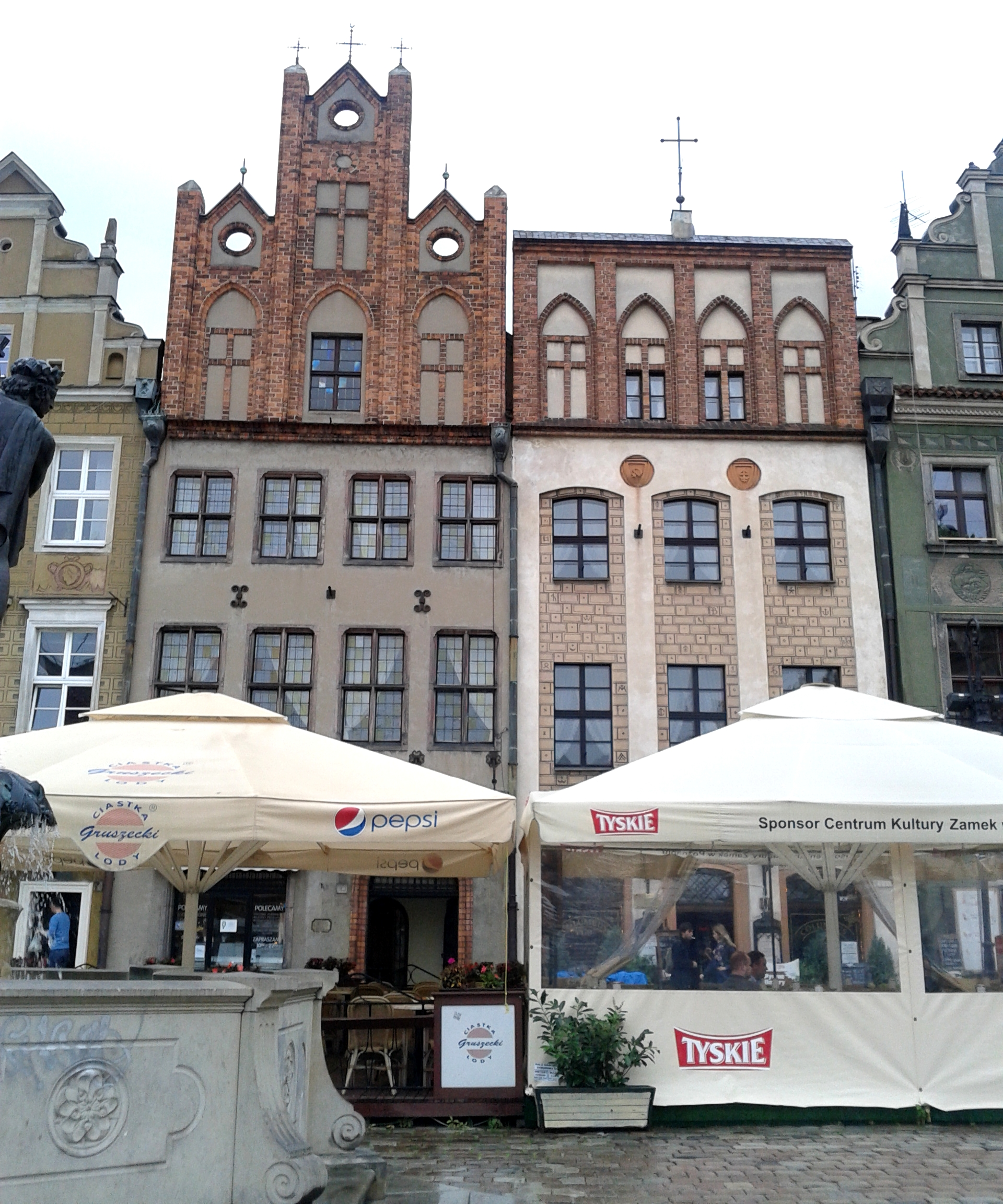
Buildings at nos. 50 and 51

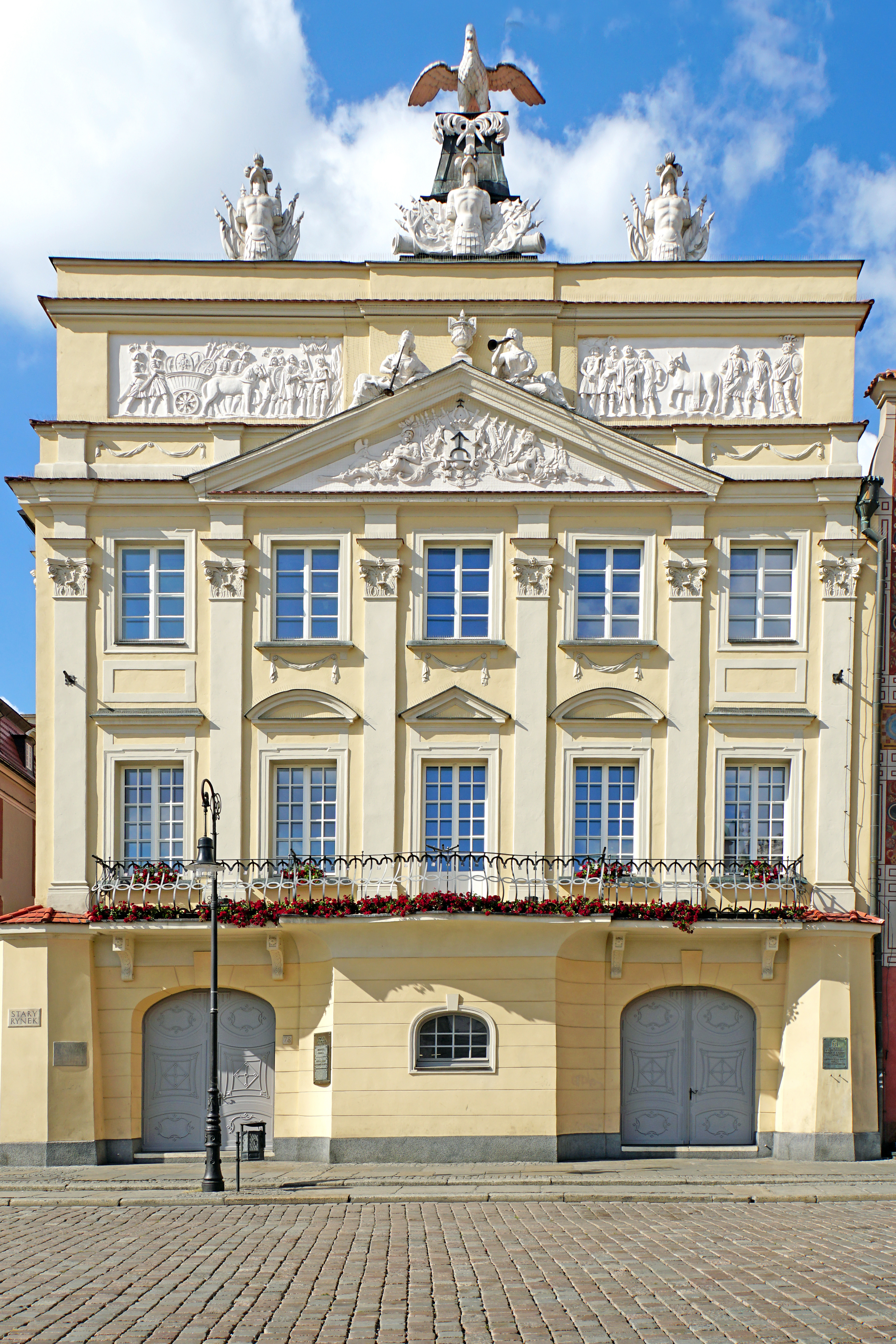
Działyński Palace

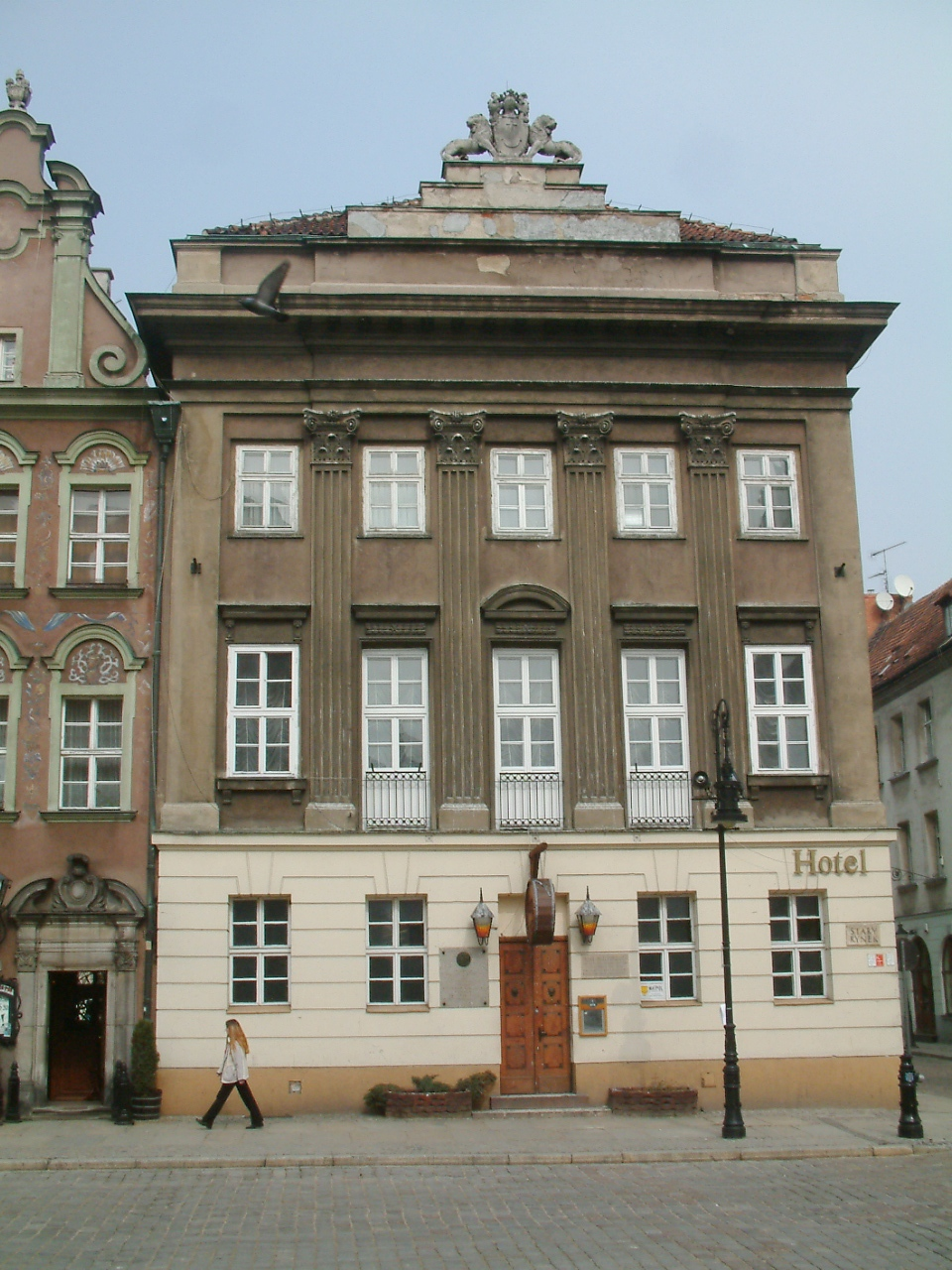
Mielżyński Palace

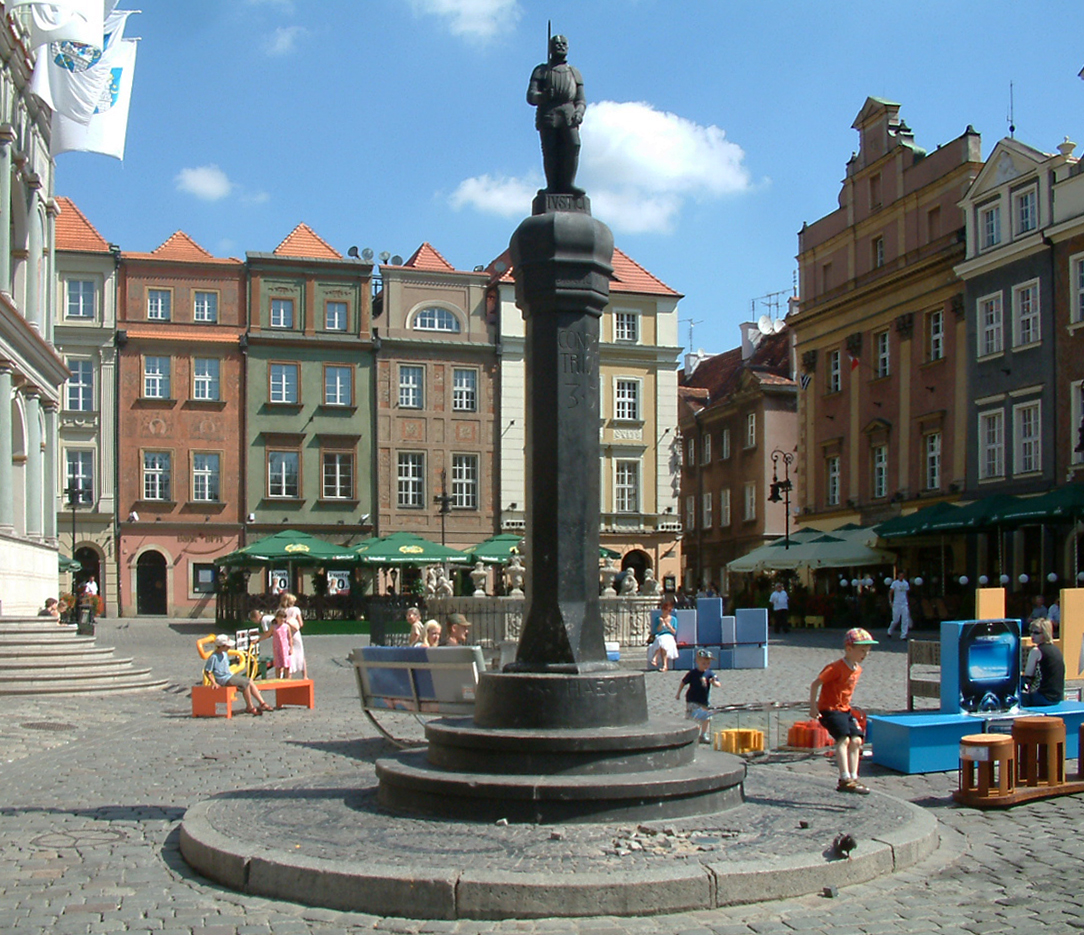
Punishment post (pranger)

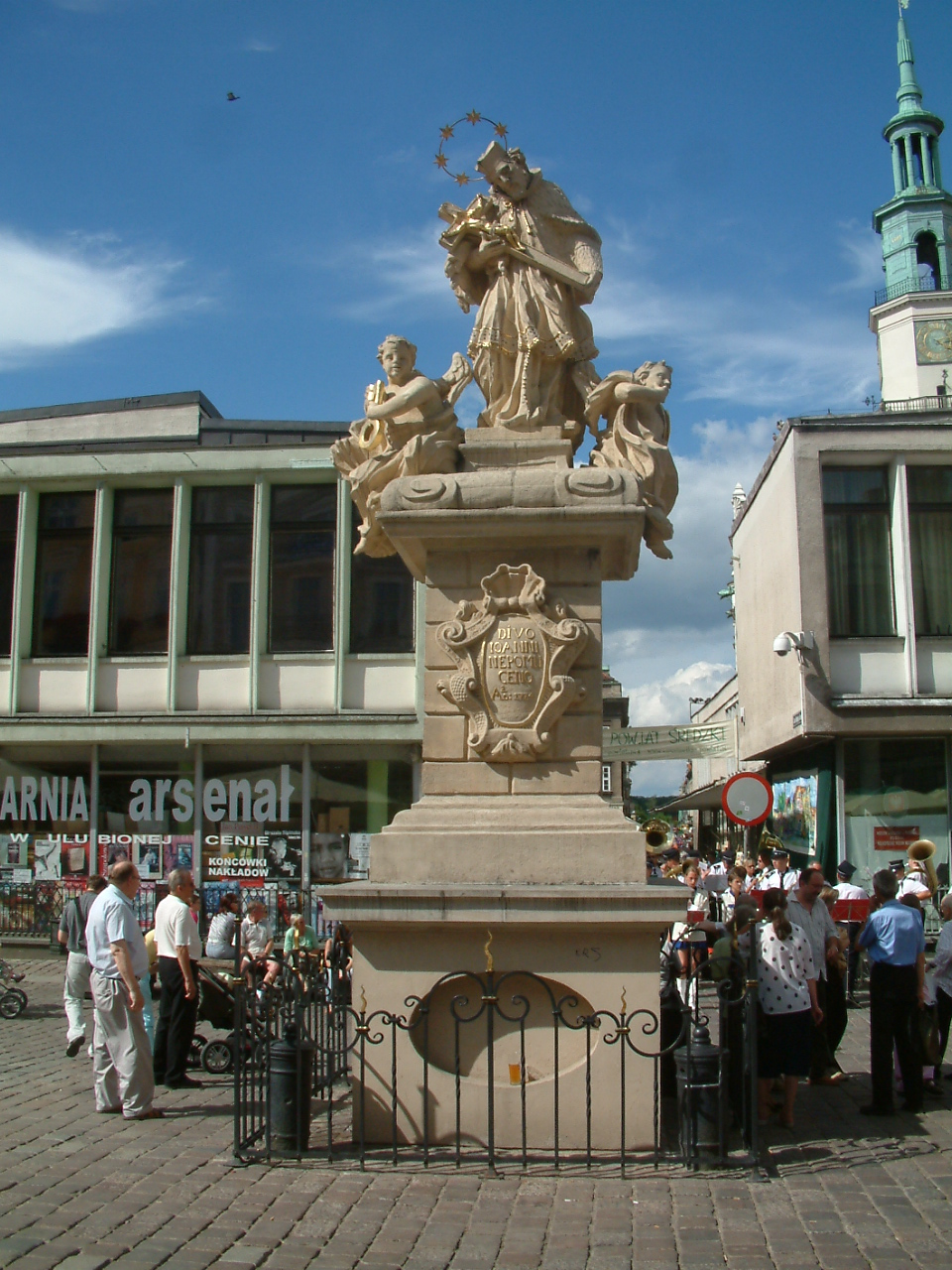
Statue of St. John Nepomucene

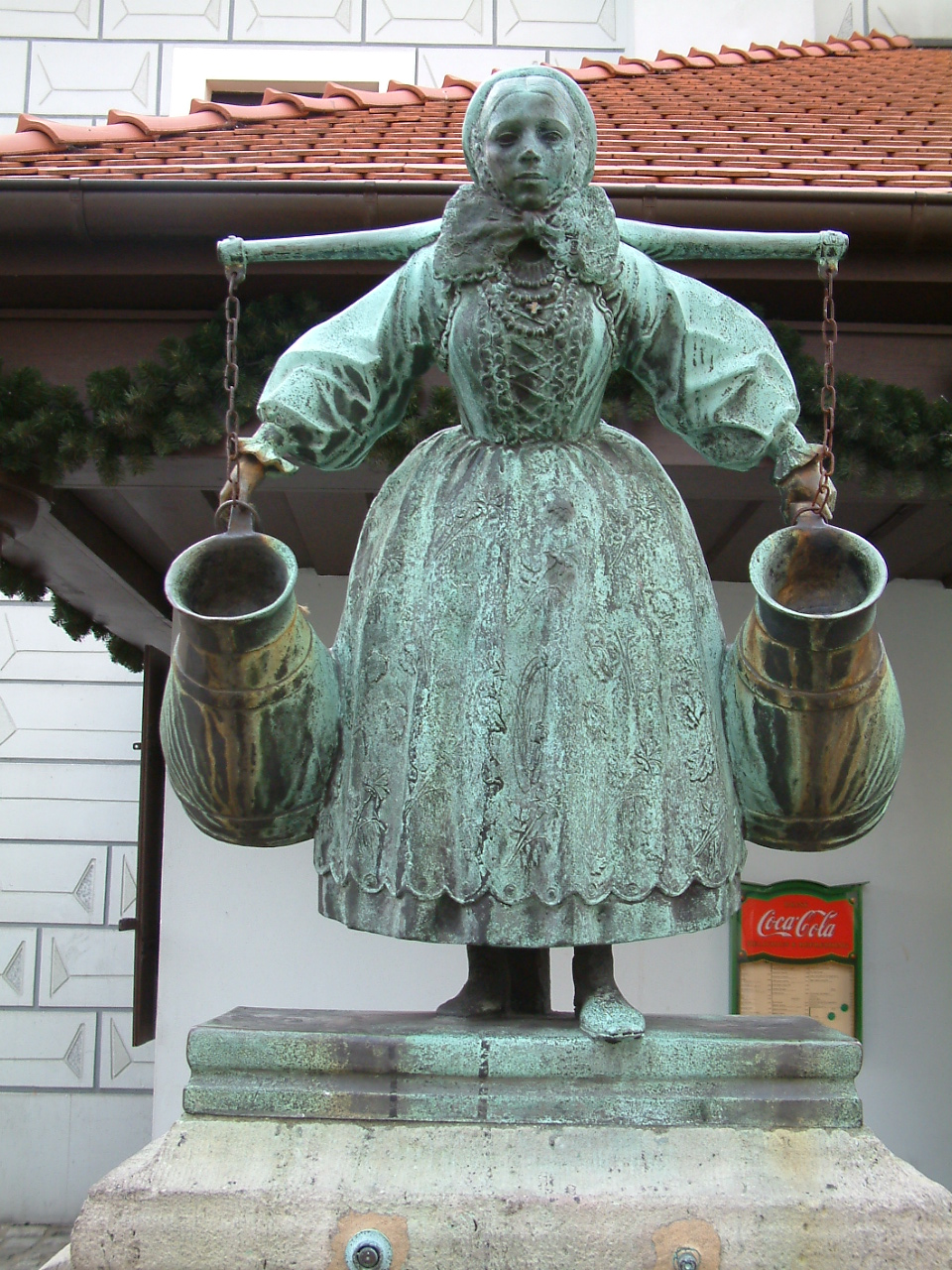
Bamberka water fountain

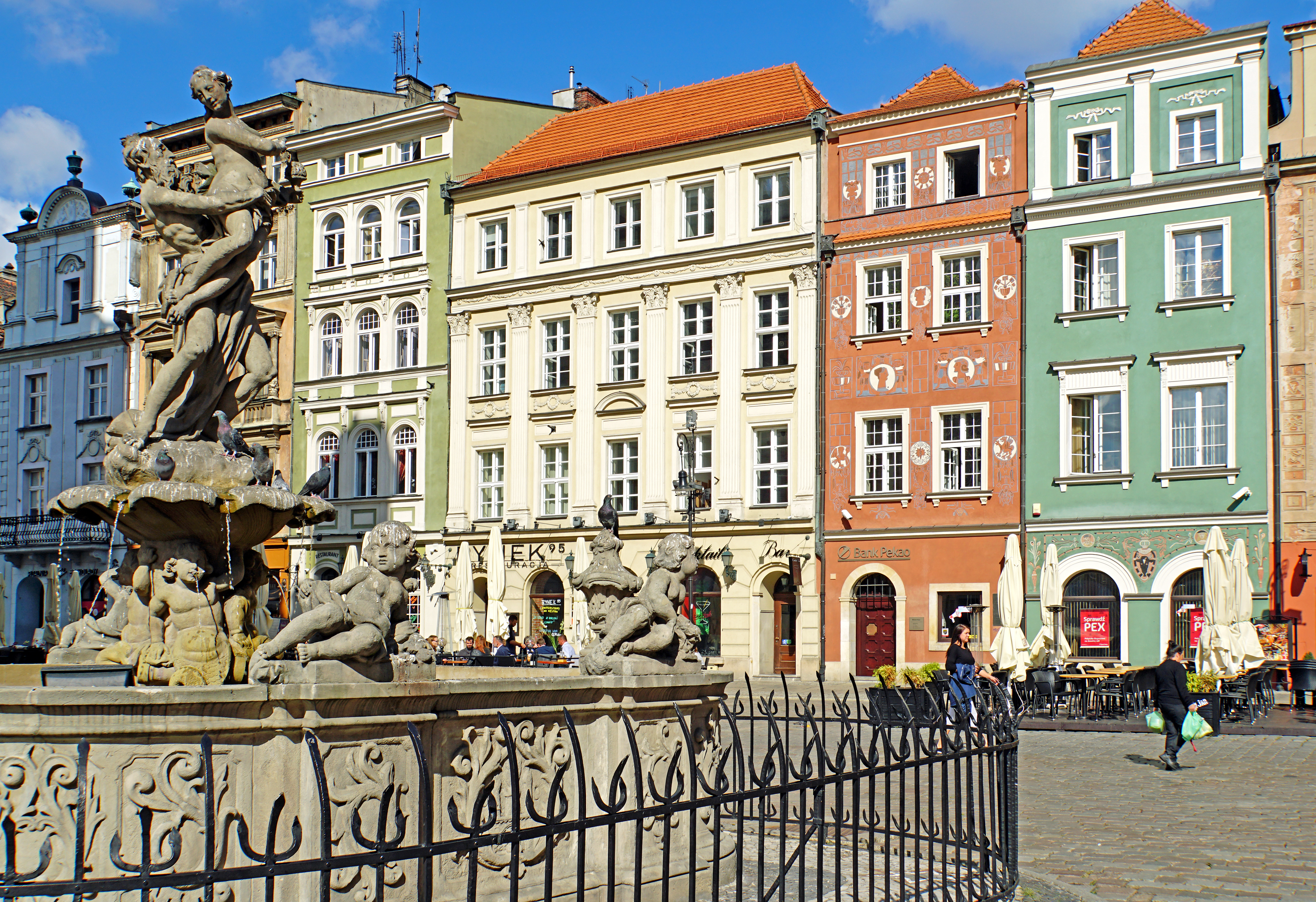
Fountain of Proserpina

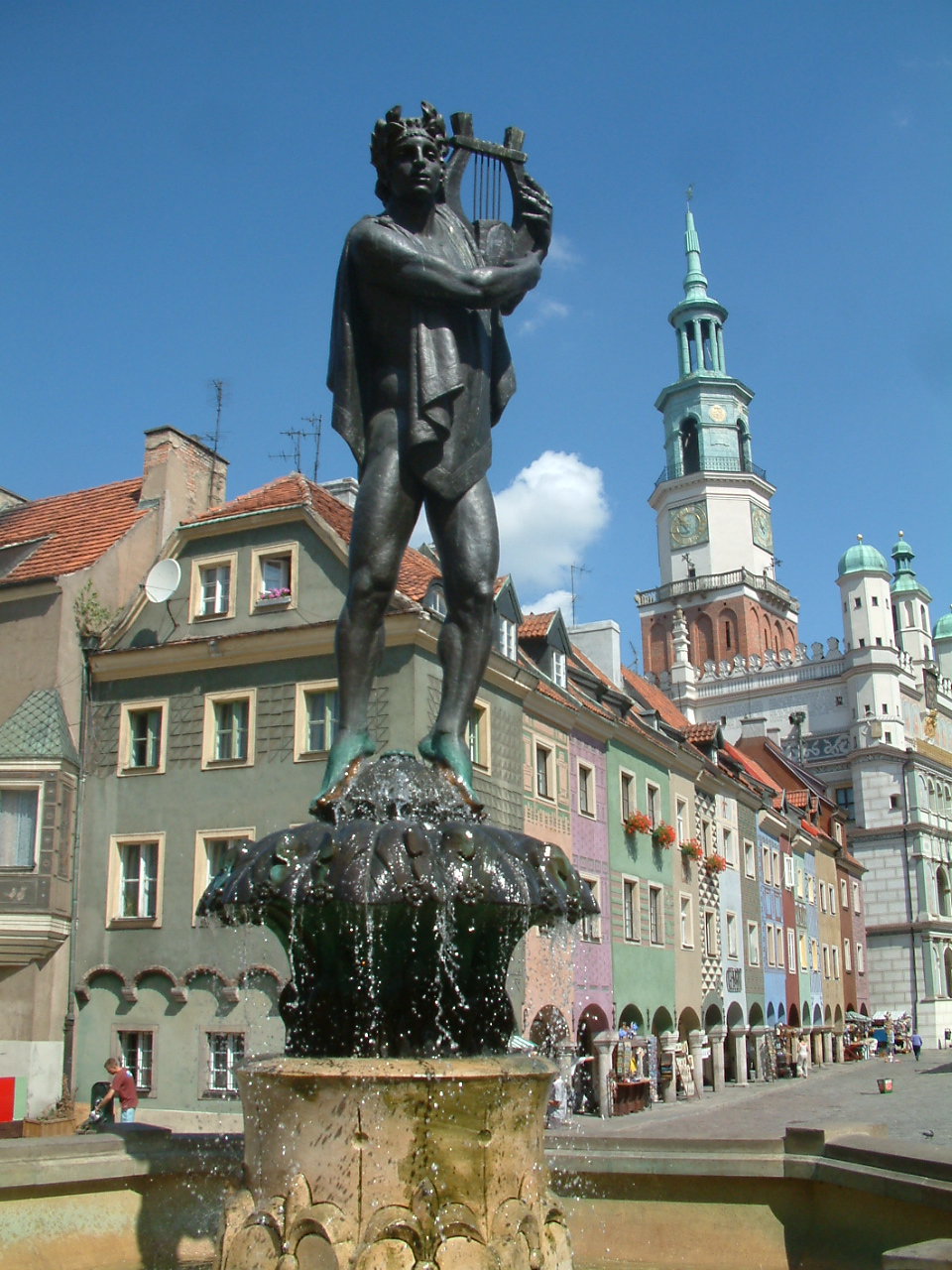
Fountain of Apollo

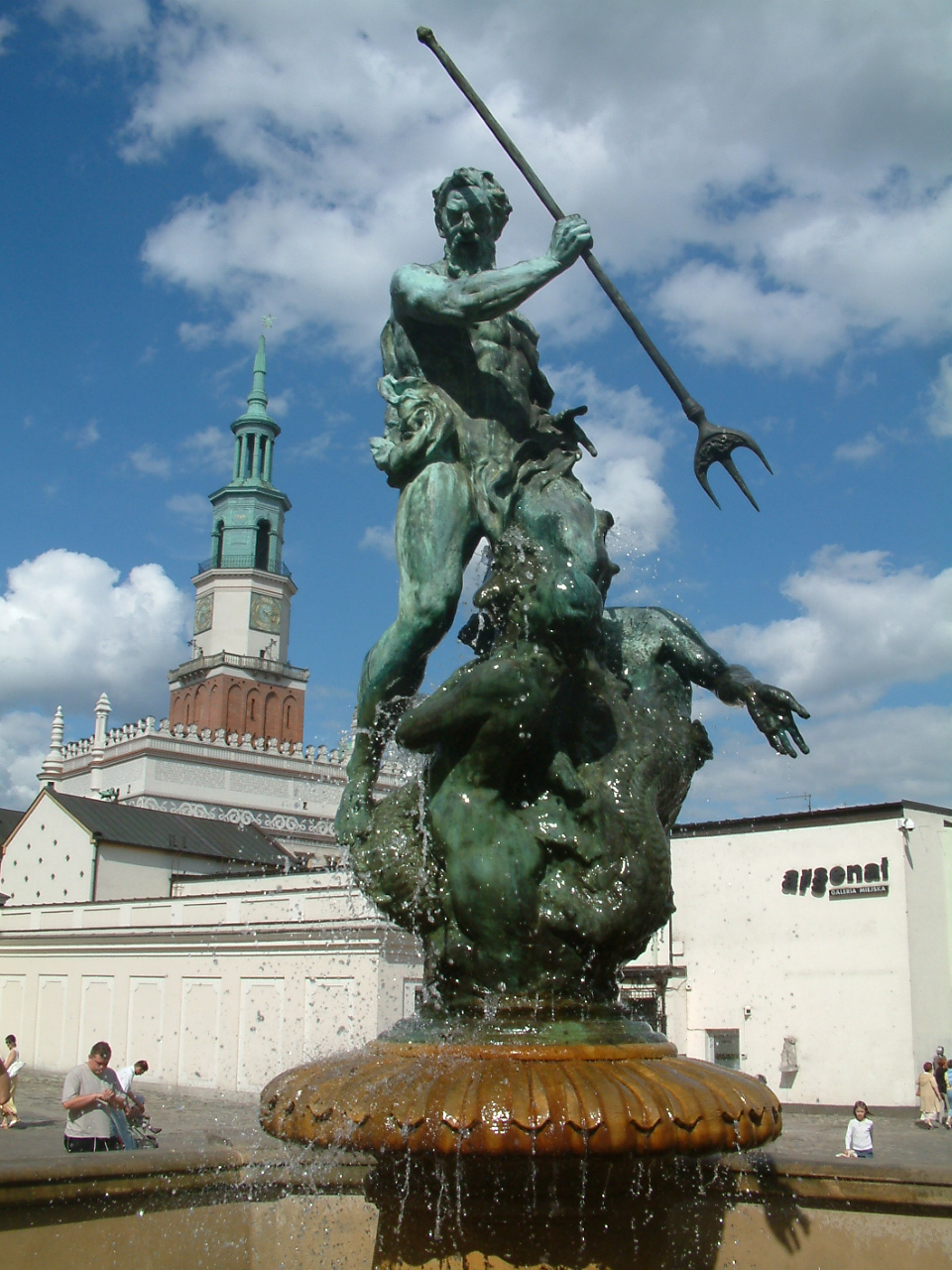
Fountain of Neptune

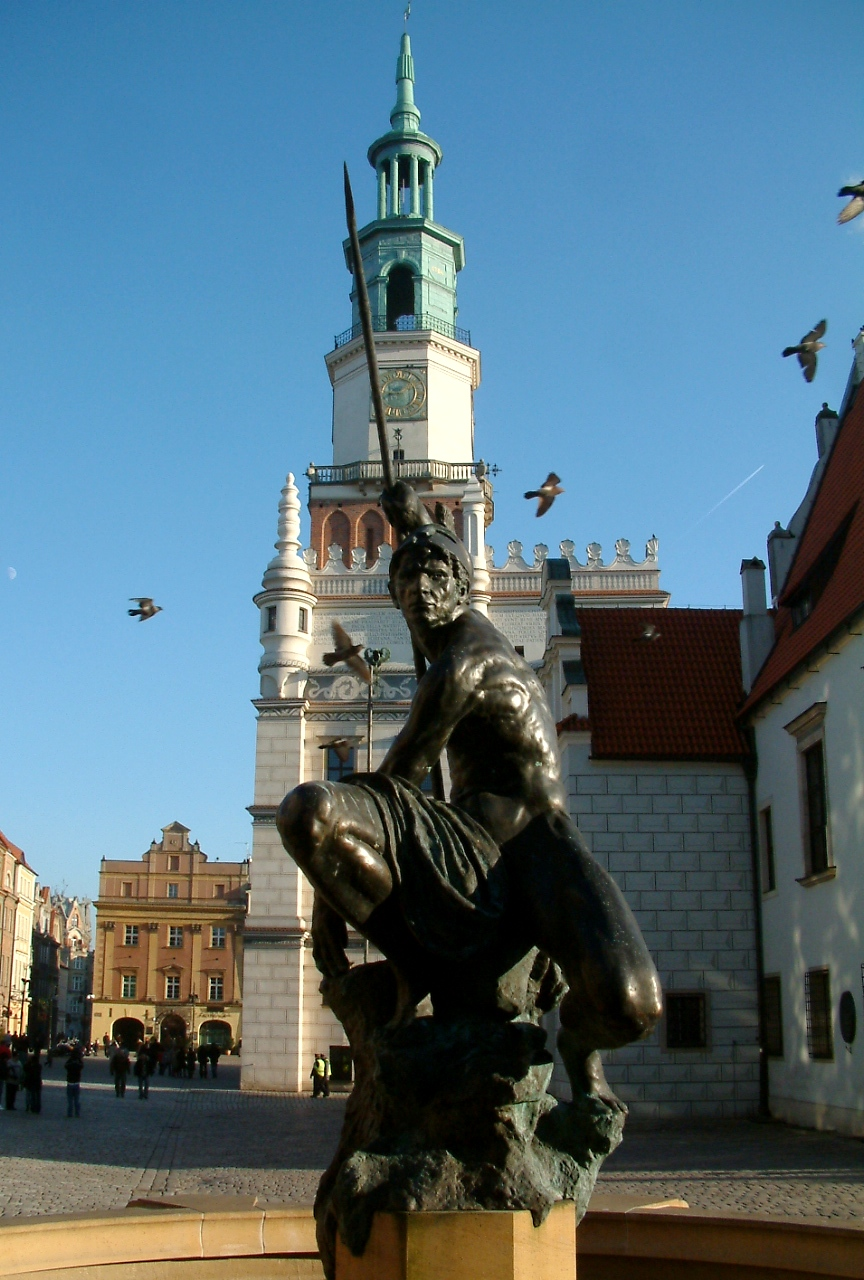
Fountain of Mars
