= Old Square (Villarrobledo) =

- Plaza Vieja (Spanish)
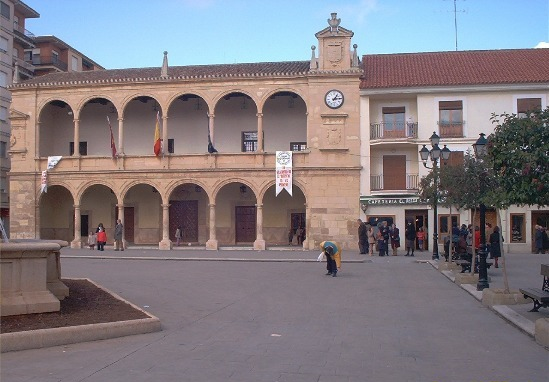

- Location within Spain
- 39.263859°N 2.604335°W
- Location: Villarrobledo, Spain

Spanish Cultural Heritage
- Official name: Plaza Vieja
- Type: Non-movable
- Criteria: Monument
- Designated: 1972
- Reference no.: RI-51-0005032

The Old Square (Spanish: Plaza Vieja) is a square located in Villarrobledo, Spain. It was declared Bien de Interés Cultural in 1972.
