= List of museums in Poznań =

Below is a list of museums in Poznań, Poland.

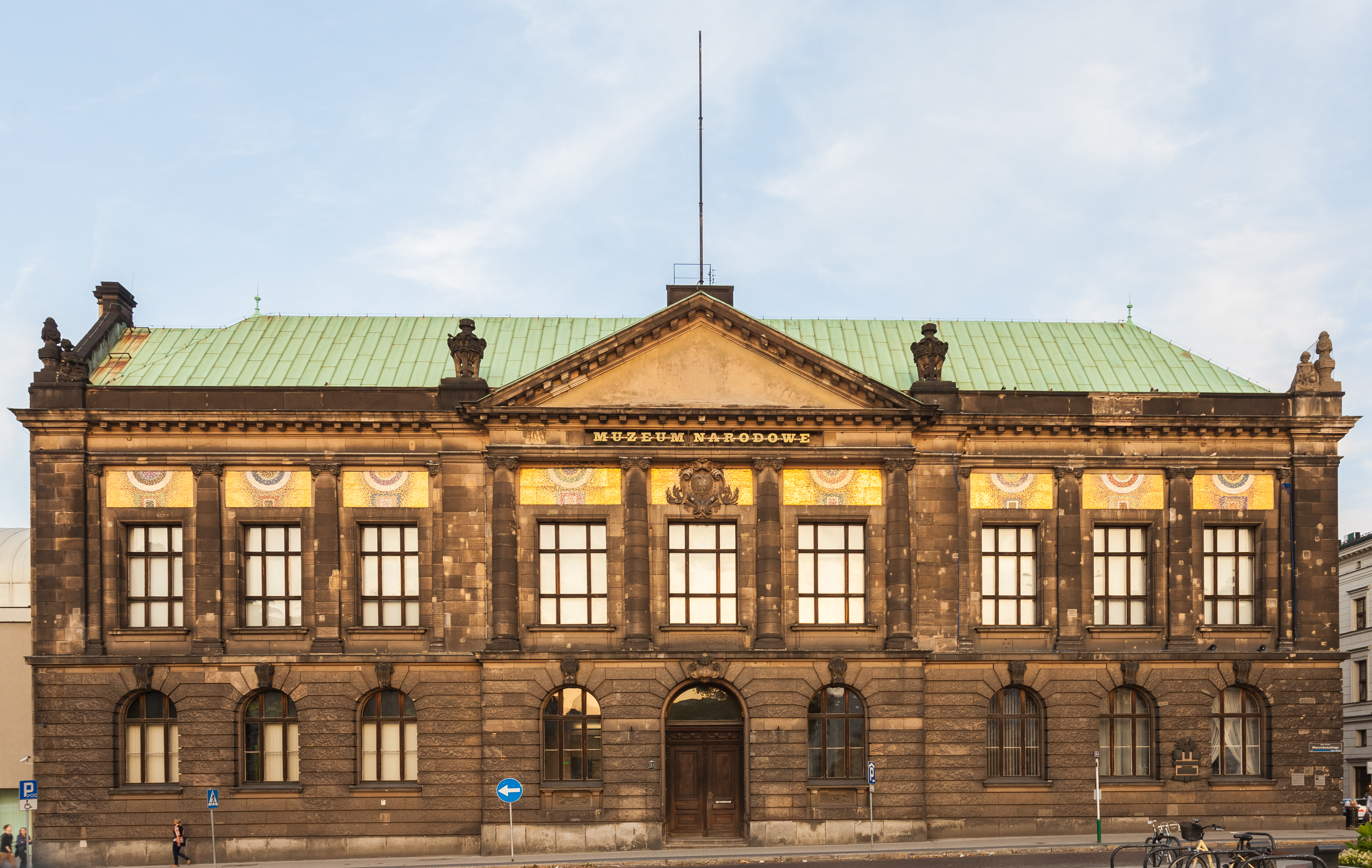
National Museum, Poznań

== The list ==
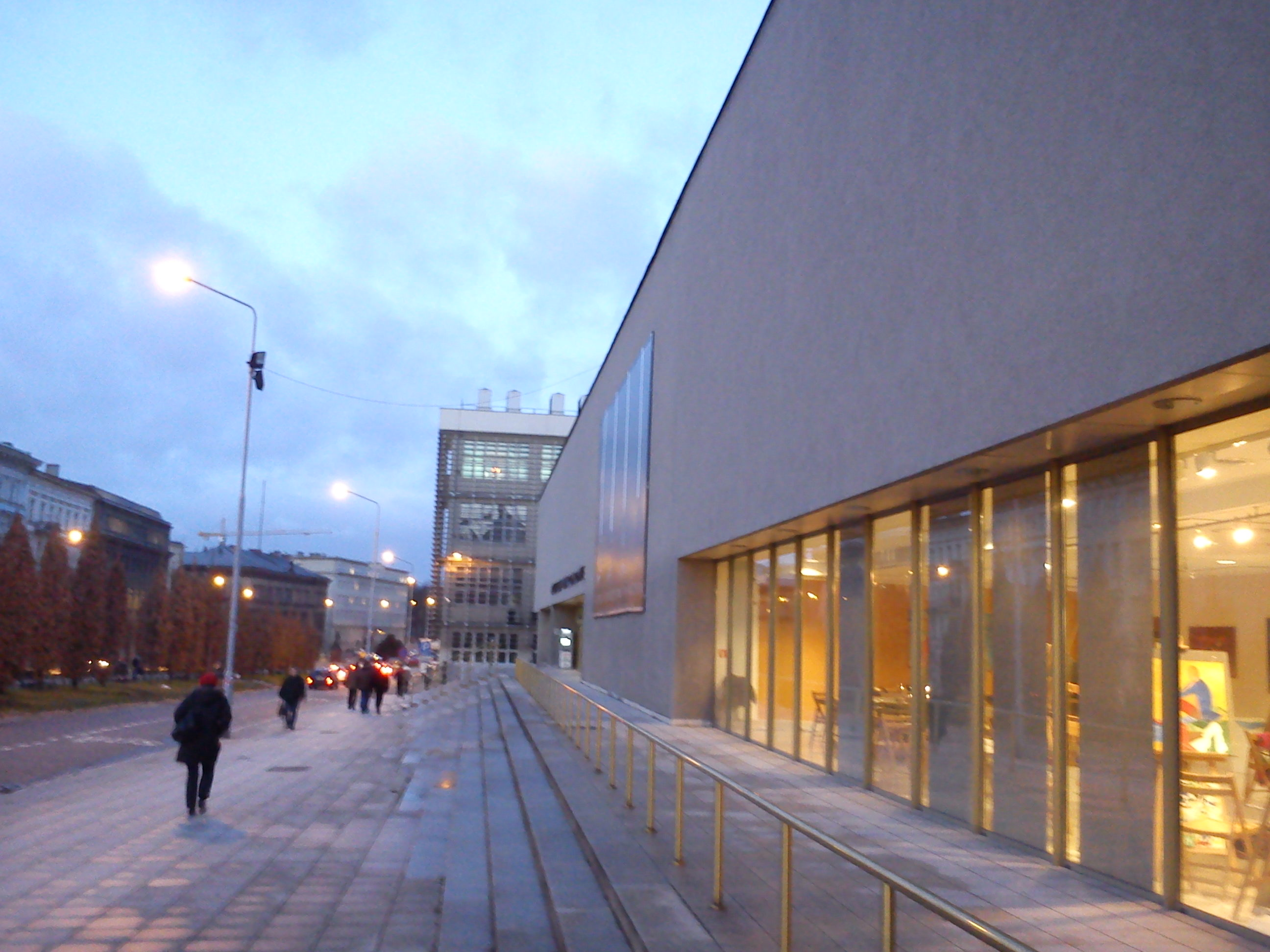
The new north wing of the National Museum, Gallery of Contemporary Art

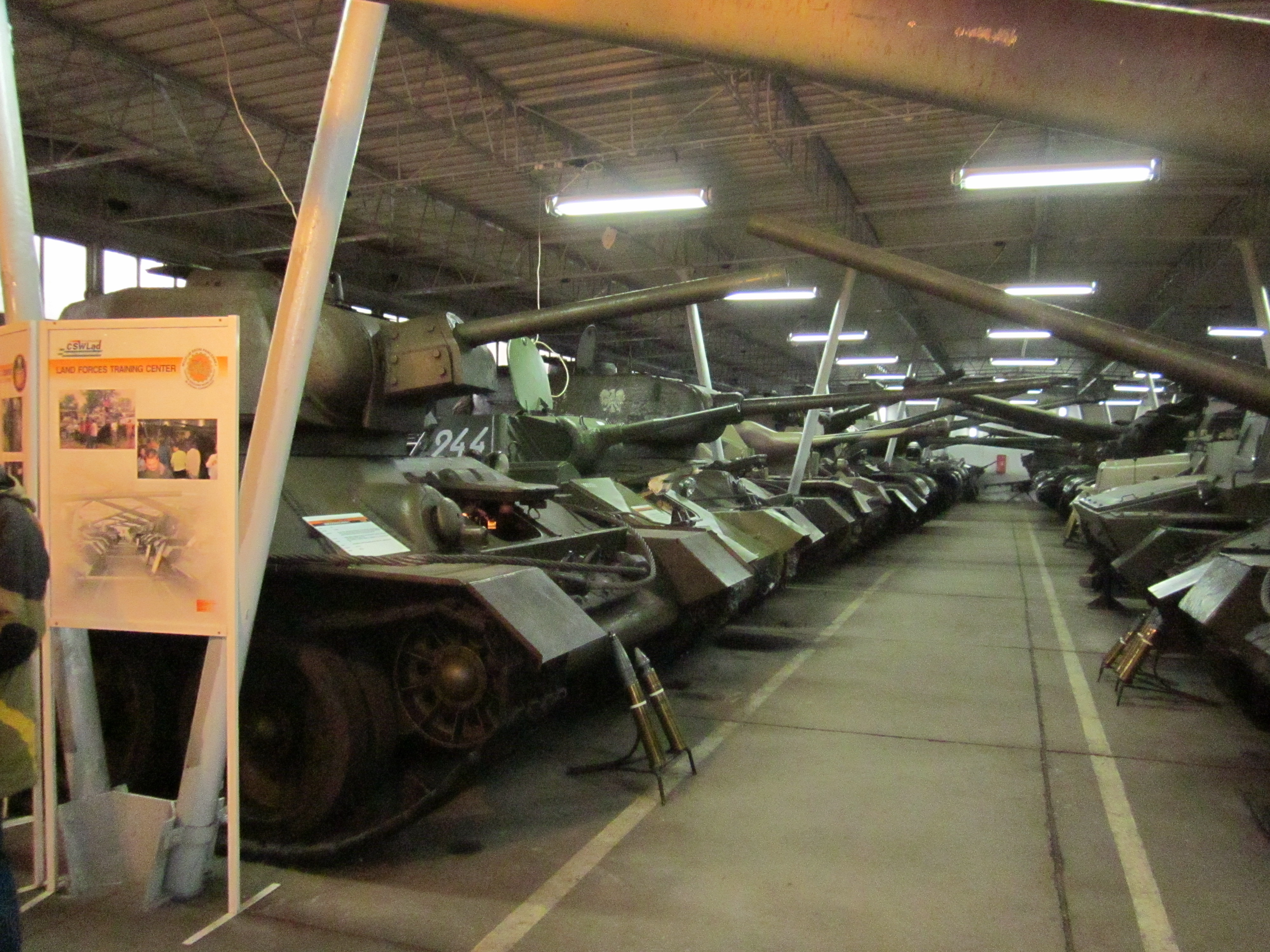
Armored Weaponry Museum

- National Museum in Poznań and its branches:
  - Museum of Applied Arts
  - Museum of the History of Poznań
  - Military Museum of Wielkopolska
  - Museum of Musical Instruments
  - Ethnography Museum

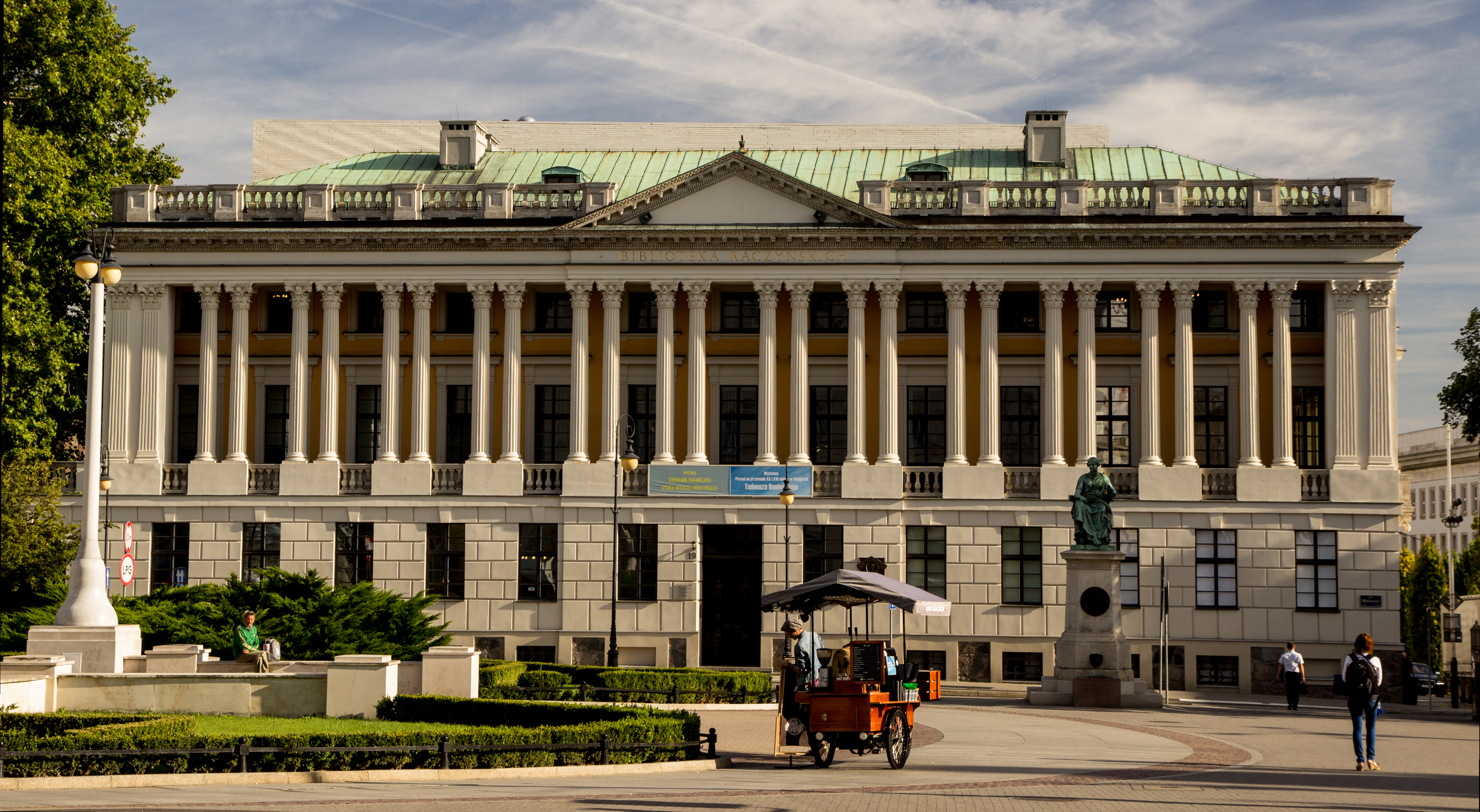
Raczyński Library

- Wielkopolska Museum of the Fight for Independence and its branches:
  - "Poznań" Army Museum
  - Fort VII Museum of the Wielkopolska Martyrs
  - Museum of the Greater Poland Uprising of 1918–1919
  - Museum of Armaments
  - June 1956 Poznań Uprising Museum
  - Shelter of the Mayor of Poznań
- Branches of the Raczyński Library:
  - Kazimiera Iłłakowiczówna Flat and Workshop
  - Henryk Sienkiewicz Literature Museum
  - Józef Kraszewski Workshop-Museum
  - Jerzy Pertek Memorial Room
- Regional Branch of PKP PLK SA Memorial Room
- Feliks Nowowiejski Music Salon-Museum
- Museum of Archaeology and its branch:
  - Archaeological Reserve Genius loci
- Archdiocesan Museum
- Armoured Warfare Museum
- Greater Poland Regional Chamber of Chemists Museum of Pharmacy
- Forensic Department Museum of Poznań University of Medical Sciences
- Museum of Historical Costume in Poznań
- Museum of Motorization, Poznań
- Museum of Police
- Museum of Environmental Knowledge
- Museum of the Poznań Bambers
- Museum of Unitra
- Museum of Earth
- Poznań Croissant Museum
