= St. Martin's croissant =

Croissant with white poppy-seed filling

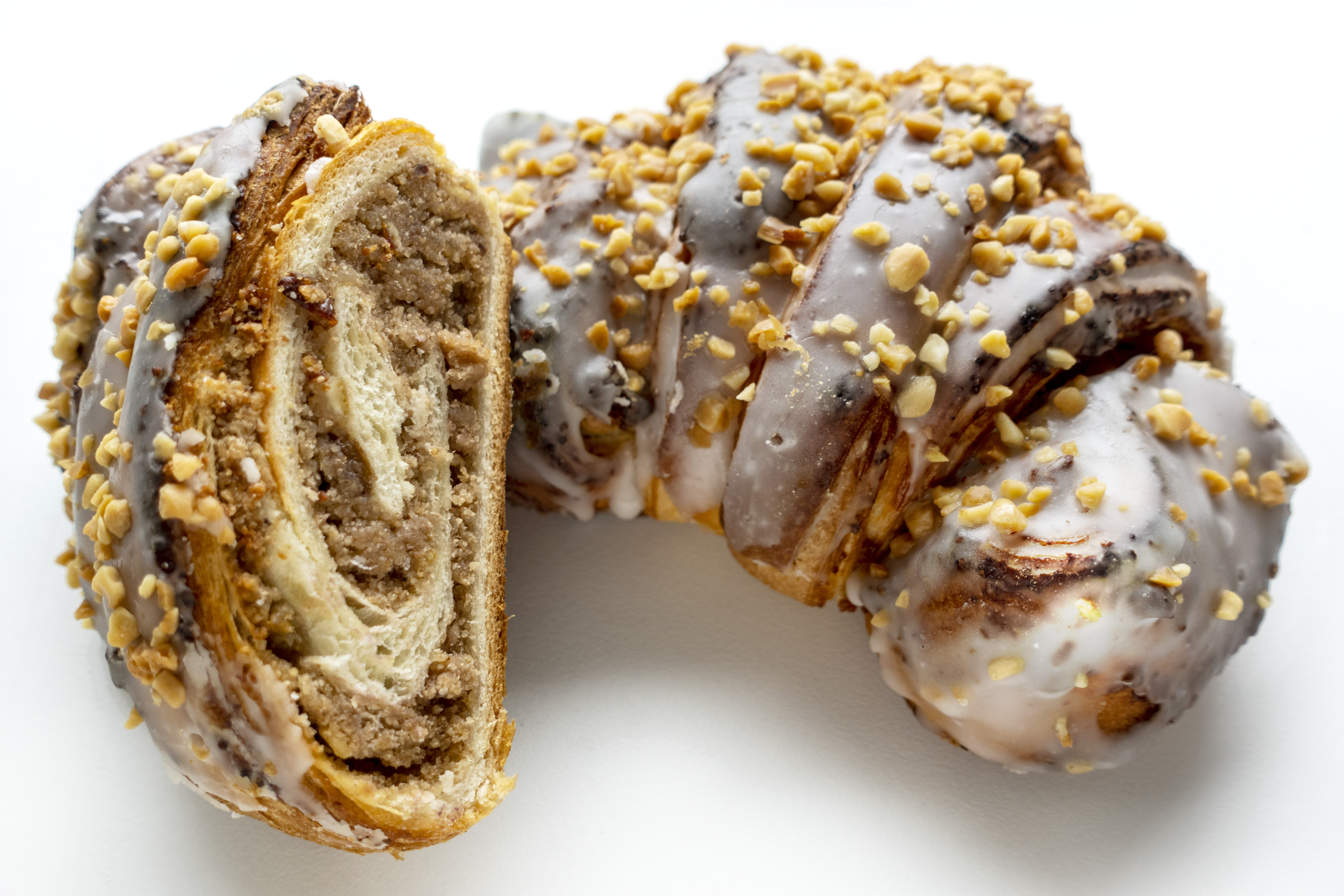
- Rogal świętomarciński
- Type: Viennoiserie
- Place of origin: Poznań, Poland
- Main ingredients: Dough, poppy seed-almond filling

St. Martin's croissant (Polish: rogal świętomarciński) is a croissant, a type of Viennoiserie, with white poppy-seed filling traditionally prepared in Poznań and some parts of Greater Poland region on the occasion of St. Martin's Day (11 November).

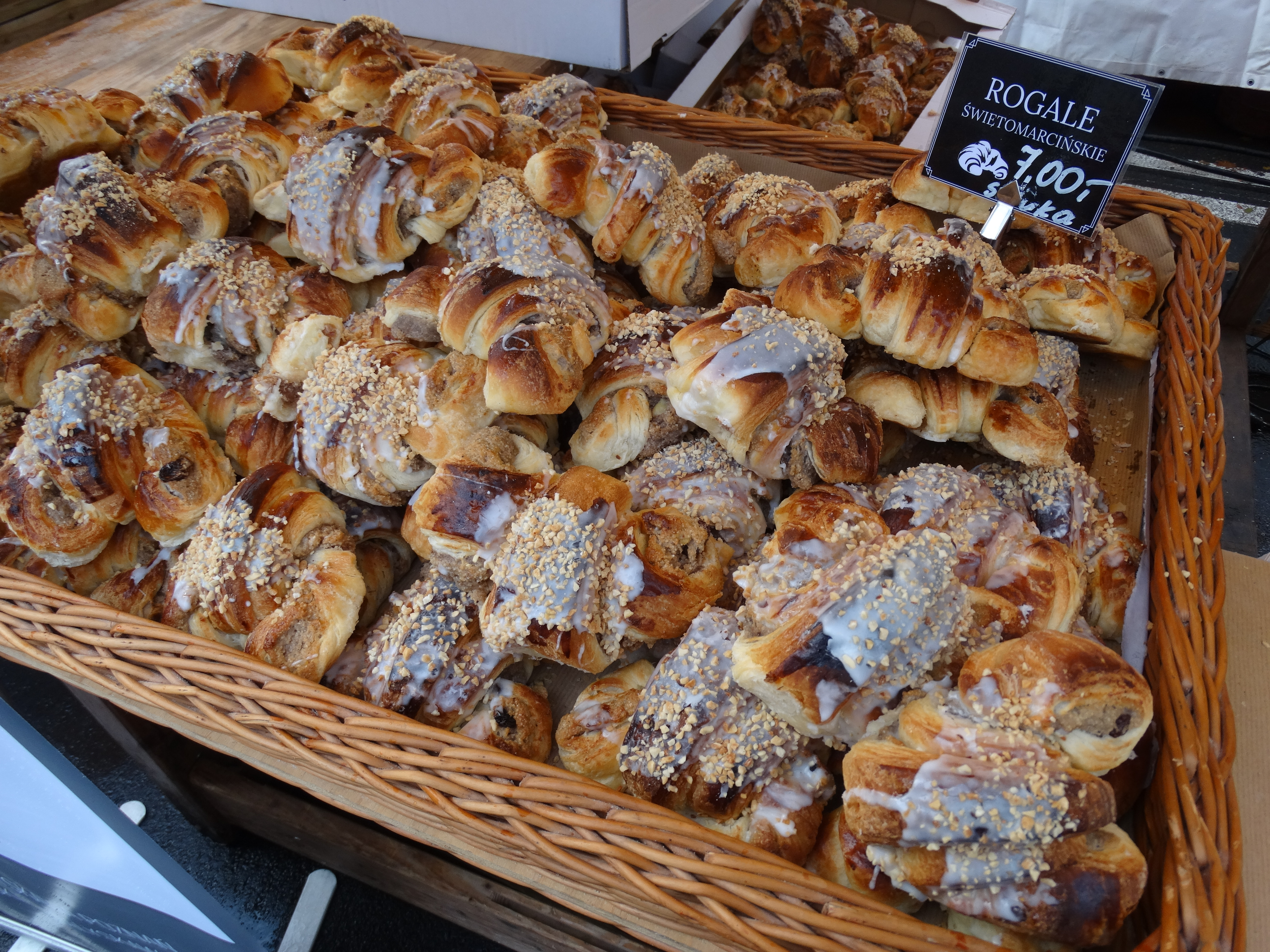
Rogal świętomarciński, St. Martin's croissants

On 30 October 2008, the name and recipe for rogal świętomarciński was entered in the register of protected designations of origin and protected geographical indications in the European Union.

== History ==
In Poznań, the tradition of baking St. Martin's croissants on 11 November certainly existed in 1860, when the oldest known advertisement for the pastry was published in Dziennik Poznański.

However, there is a popular legend that the tradition in its present form was born in November 1891. As St. Martin's Day was approaching, the parish priest of St. Martin's parish, Fr Jan Lewicki, appealed to the faithful to do something for the poor, following the example of the patron saint. The confectioner Józef Melzer, who was present at the mass and worked in a nearby confectionery, persuaded his boss to revive the old tradition. The wealthier Poznań residents bought the delicacy and the poor received it for free. The custom of baking in 1901 was taken over by the Association of Confectioners. After the First World War, Franciszek Rączyński returned to the tradition of giving gifts to the poor, and after the Second World War, Zygmunt Wasiński saved the croissant from oblivion.

== Ingredients ==
The filling must, according to the protected designation documentation, consist of "white poppy seeds, sugar, crumbs, egg pulp, margarine, raisins, nuts, fruit in syrup or candied fruit". The croissant is coated with a sugar icing and sprinkled with nuts.

== See also ==
- Poznań Croissant Museum
- Kifli
- List of pastries
