= Wielkopolska Museum of Independence =

Polish history museum

Coordinates: 52.4083°N 16.9331°E

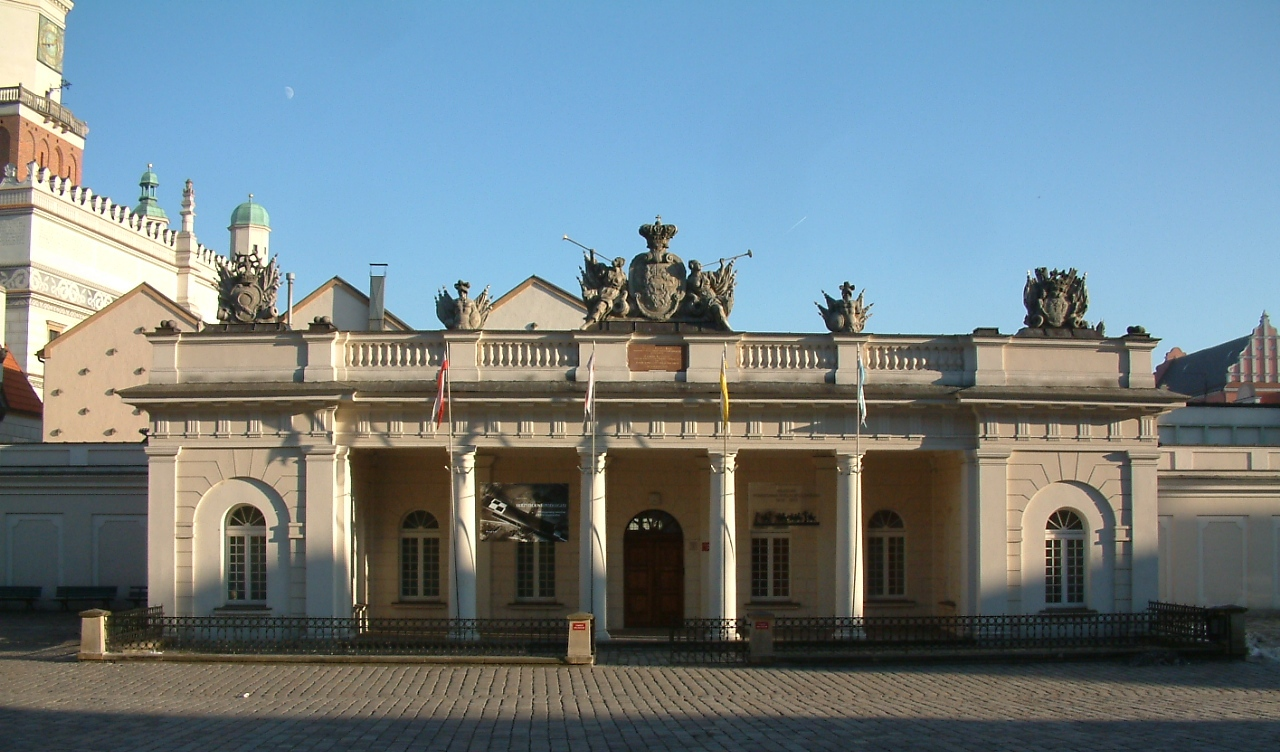
Wielkopolska Museum of Independence, Museum of the Greater Poland Uprising of 1918-1919

Wielkopolska Museum of Independence is a museum, a local cultural institution organized by the city of Poznań. The scope of the museum's activities includes collecting and making available collections on the independence uprisings and organic work during the partitions, the period of the Second Republic of Poland, fighting and martyrdom during World War II, as well as protests and opposition activities in the years 1945-1989. Before the name was changed, the museum was known as the Wielkopolska Museum of the Fight for Independence.

The Chairman of the Museum Council in the 2016–2020 term is professor Zbigniew Pilarczyk from Adam Mickiewicz University, while the Director is Tomasz Łęcki.

The museum is entered in the list of museums kept by the minister in charge of culture and national heritage protection.

== Branches ==
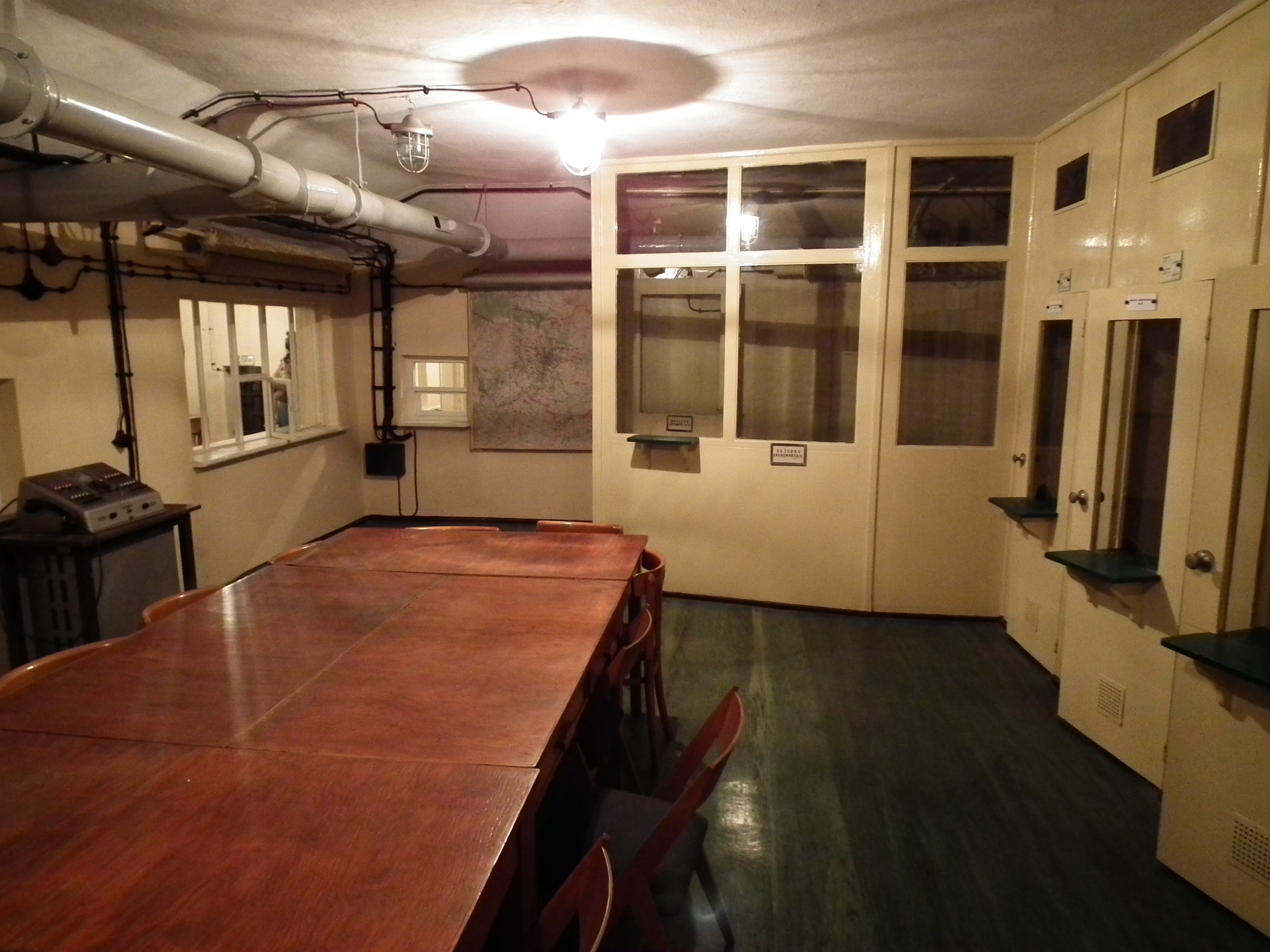
Shelter of the Mayor of Poznań

- Wielkopolska Museum of Independence
  - "Poznań" Army Museum
  - Fort VII Museum of the Wielkopolska Martyrs
  - Museum of the Greater Poland Uprising of 1918-1919
  - Museum of Armaments
  - June 1956 Poznań Uprising Museum
  - Shelter of the Mayor of Poznań
