= Museum of Historical Costume in Poznań =

The Museum of Historical Costume in Poland
- Muzeum Historii Ubioru w Poznaniu
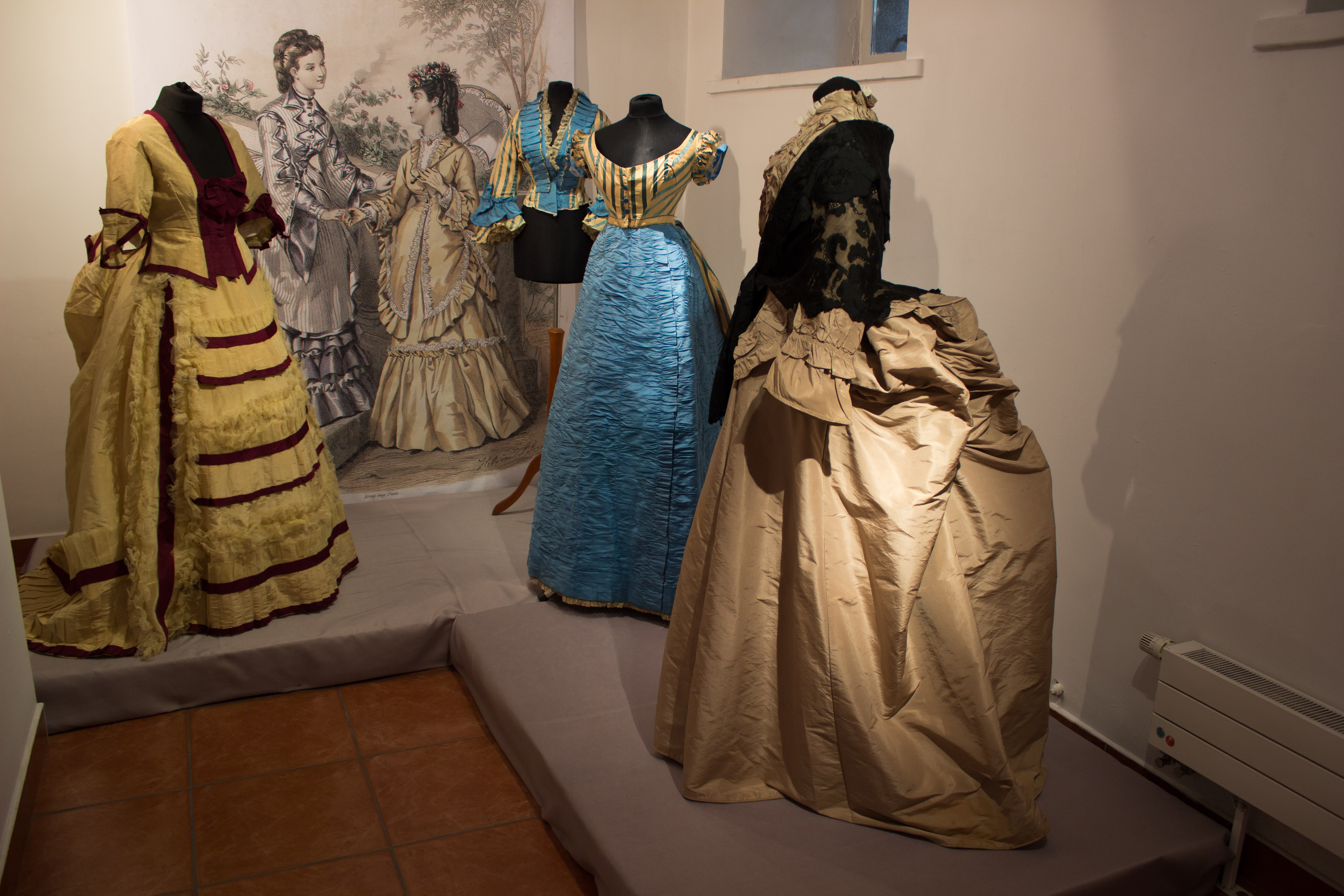
- Established: Start date|2018-12-20
- Location: Kwiatowa Street 14/2, 61-886 Poznań, Poland
- Type: Museum of Utility Art, Private Museum
- Collections: Historic costumes, dresses and accessories from the 19th century
- Collection size: 80
- Founder: Anna Moryto
- Director: Anna Moryto

The Museum of Historical Costume in Poland (Polish: Muzeum Historii Ubioru w Poznaniu [m'ooz'e'oom h'eest'or'ee'ee 'oob'ee'or'oo]) is a private museum located in a tenement house on Kwiatowa Street 14/2 in Poznan, Poland. Founded in December, 2018 by Anna Moryto.

== History ==
The museum was founded by Anna Moryto, private Polish collector of historical vintage dresses and costumes. It has transformed into a museum in December 2018 from a private art gallery – XIXgallery. The gallery was known from its traveling exhibitions around the country. Since 2004, Anna Moryto is collecting historical vintage dresses and accessories, mostly from the 19th century. The original nineteenth-century pieces come from trade and auction houses from the US and London.

Next to the museum there is working an atelier of the reconstruction of costumes “Costumes With Passion” (“Stroje z Pasją”). The atelier is conducting the renovation and maintenance of the exhibits, and creating reconstructions of the dresses from the 19th century.

== Mission ==
The mission of the museum is an educational nature. The plans for the future contain transforming into historical theme museum. It would cover the 19th century lifestyle and culture, and position of the women in the society. The fashion itself would become more as a part of the bigger picture. The mission of the museum is to educate children, young adults, and history enthusiasts about 19th history and history of fashion. It is a unique opportunity to see the vintage costumes live. The museum is also substantive support for costume designers. There are plans for upcoming temporary collections and one permanent exhibition.

== Collection ==
The collection consists of over 80 antique exhibits, including over 50 complete costumes, mostly from the 19th century. It is the largest complication of the original historical costumes in Poland. Only few of the dresses among the collection were made as reconstructions. The collection includes dresses, underwear and accessories.

The most highlight exhibits are:

- Summer dress from the 1840s century
- Dress from 1840 with decoration made of fake buttons
- Evening gown ca. 1880, from trading house B. Altman.

== Traveling exhibitions ==
- September 27, 2018 – December 9, 2018 – District Museum in Pila, Poland
- September 12, 2018 – December 14, 2018 – Museum of Fortifications and Weapons “Arsenal” in Zamosc, Poland
- December 17, 2017 – January 15, 2018 – City Museum in Nowa Sol, Poland
- July 6, 2017 – September 8, 2017 – Regional Museum in Czluchow, Poland
- March 8, 2017 – May 14, 2017 – Museum Gorki's Castle in Szamotuly, Poland
- March 5, 2016 – May 4, 2016 – Museum of Silesian Piasts in Brzeg, Poland
- July 2, 2015 – September 6, 2015 – Regional Museum in Szczecinek, Poland
- March 8, 2014 – May 27, 2014 – Silesian Museum of Opole Region in Opole, Poland
- May 2012 – June 3, 2012 – Museum of Henryk Sienkiewicz in Oblegork, Poland.

== Gallery ==
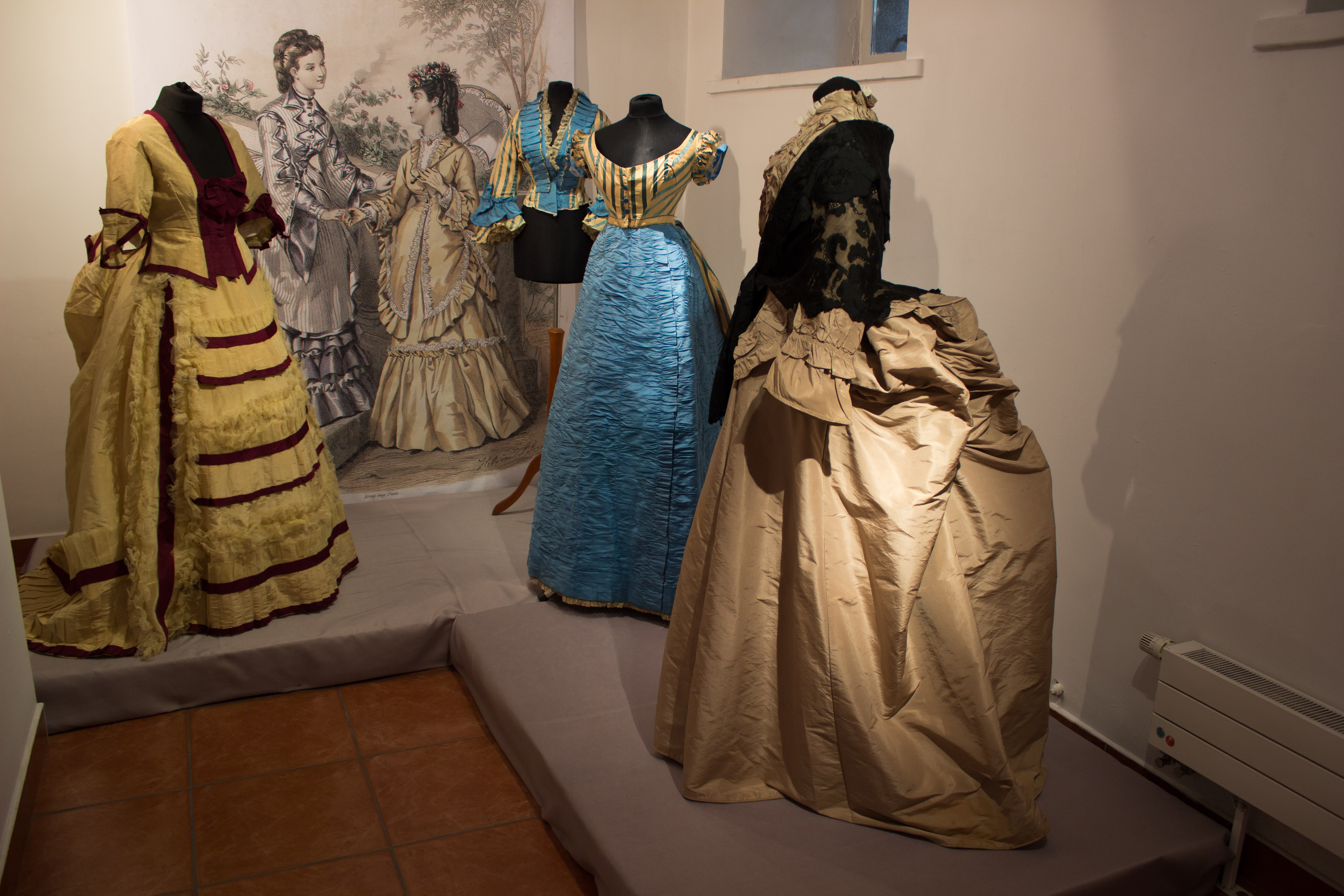
Exposition „Belle epoque. Women fashion 1871-1914"

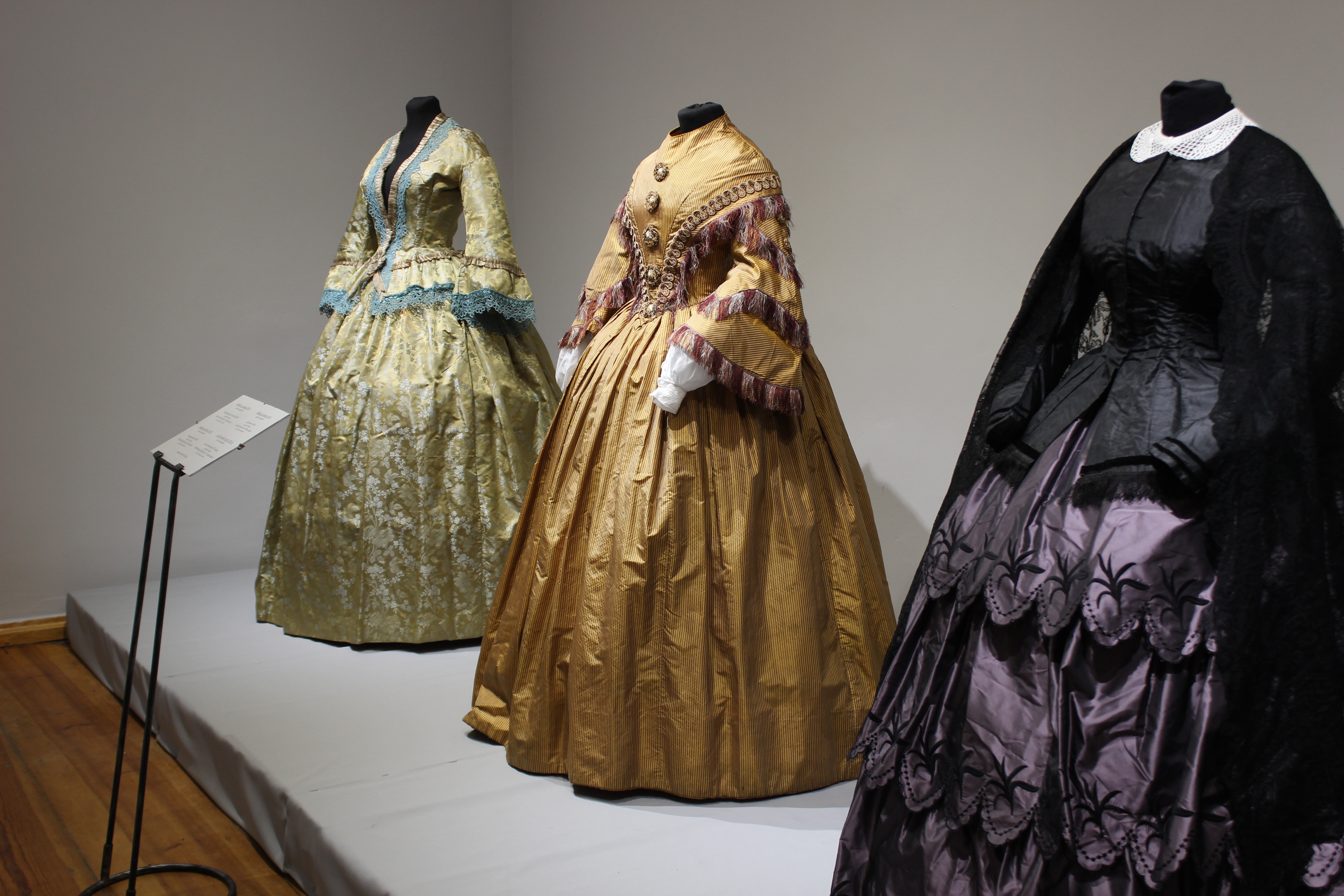
Exhibition "Fashion Repeats Itself" in Museum of Historical Costume in Poznan, PL

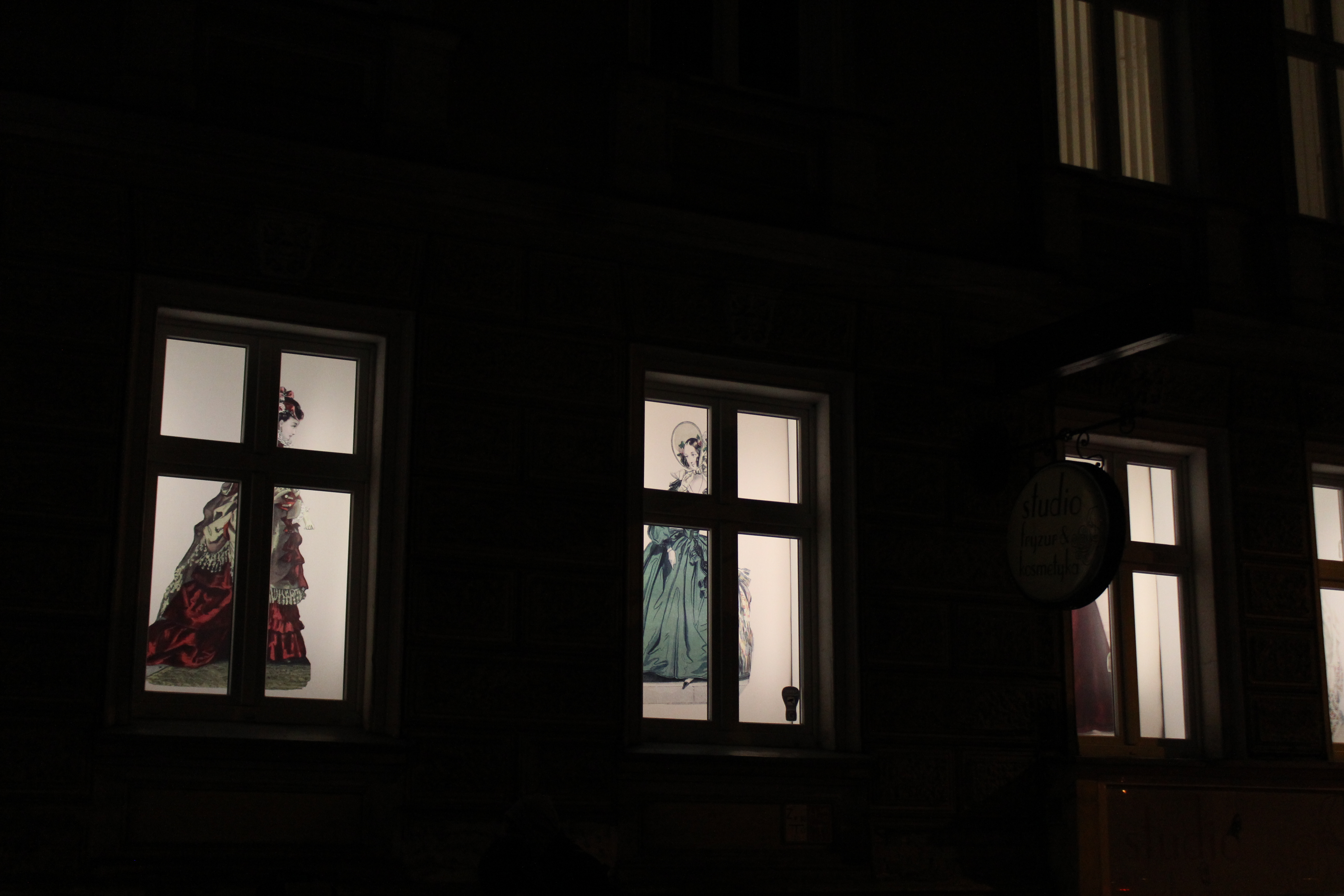
View on the Museum from outside in the night time.

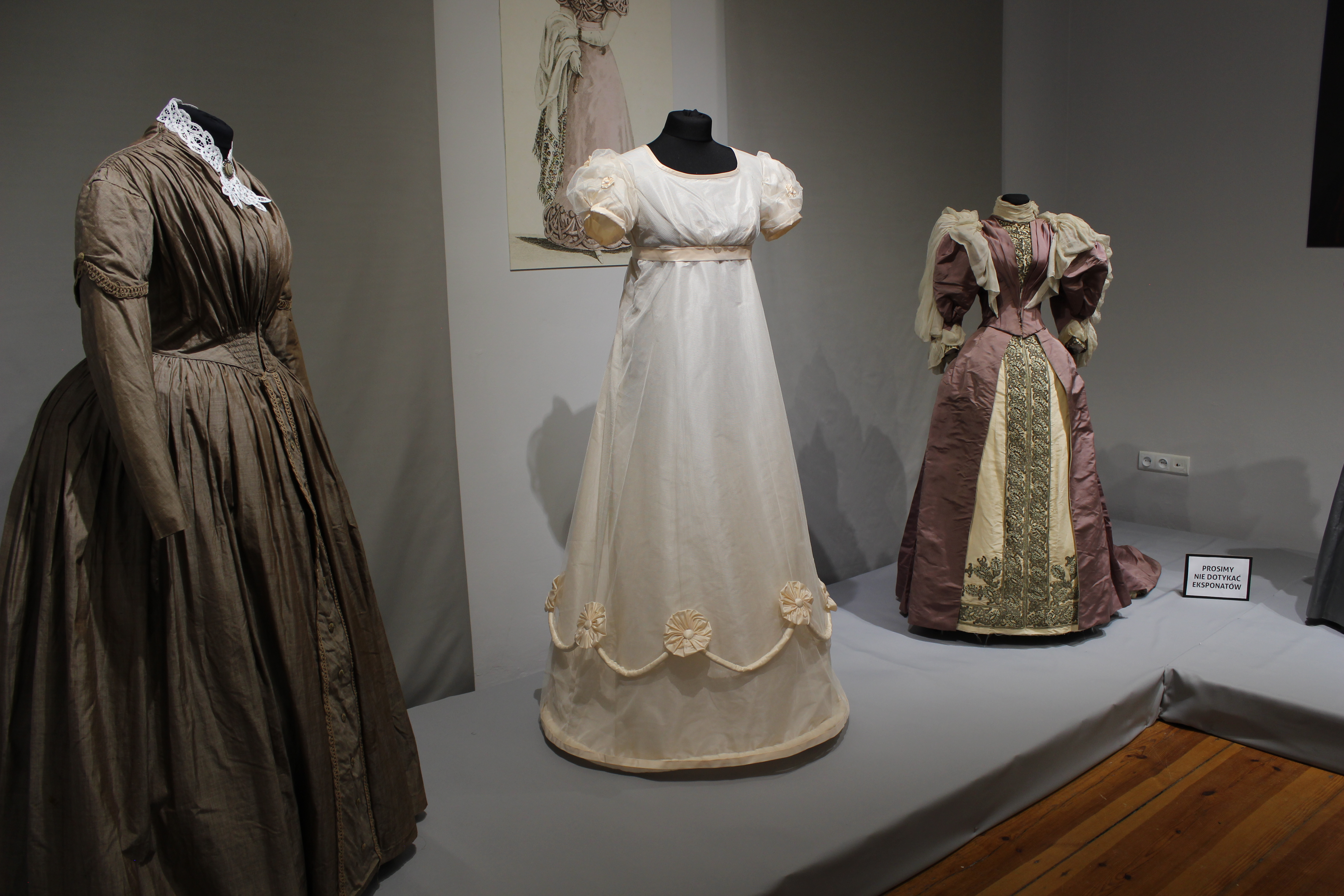
Exposition "Fashion Repeats Itself" in Museum of Historical Costume in Poznan, PL

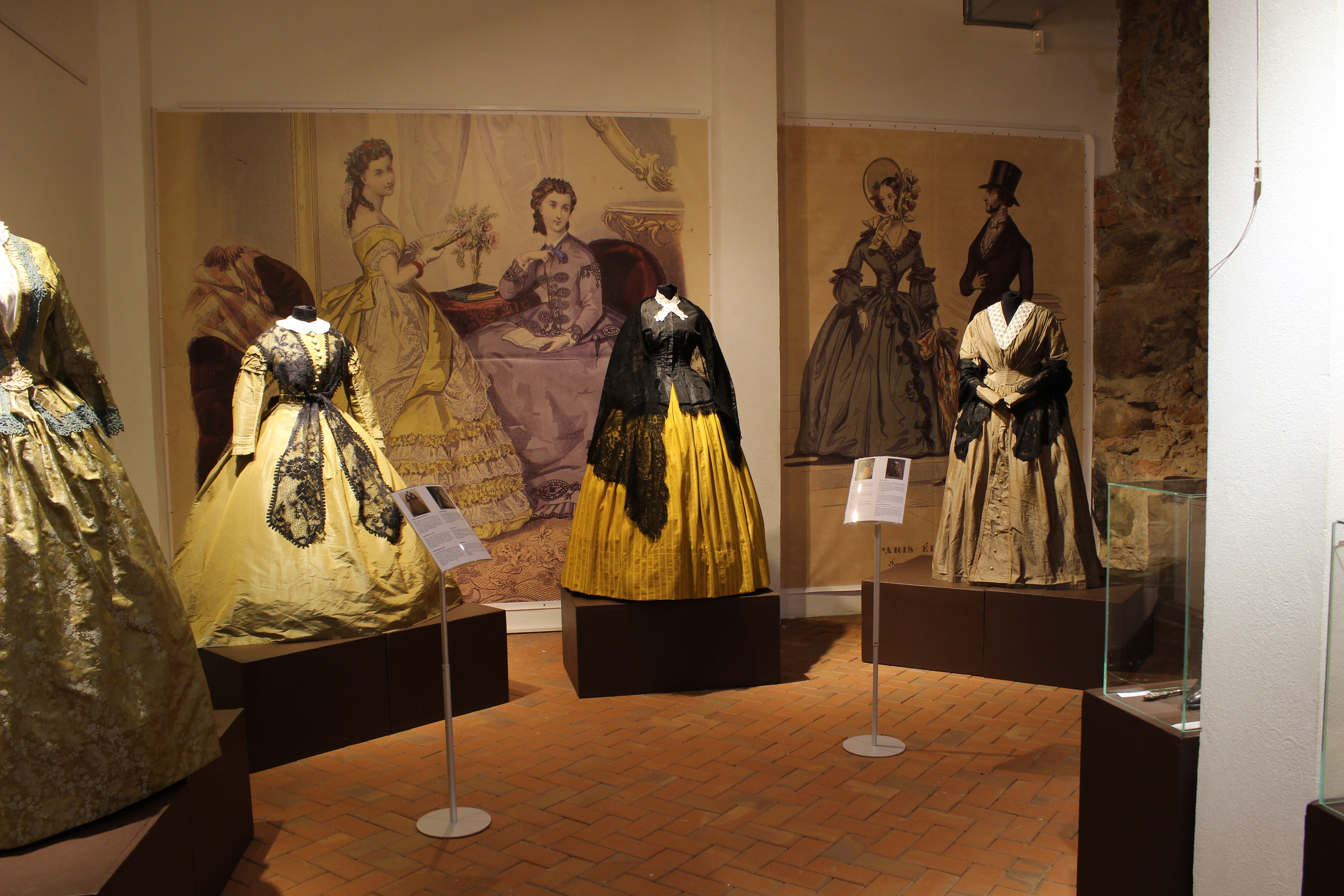
Exposition of 19th century dresses in Regional Museum in Czluchow, PL

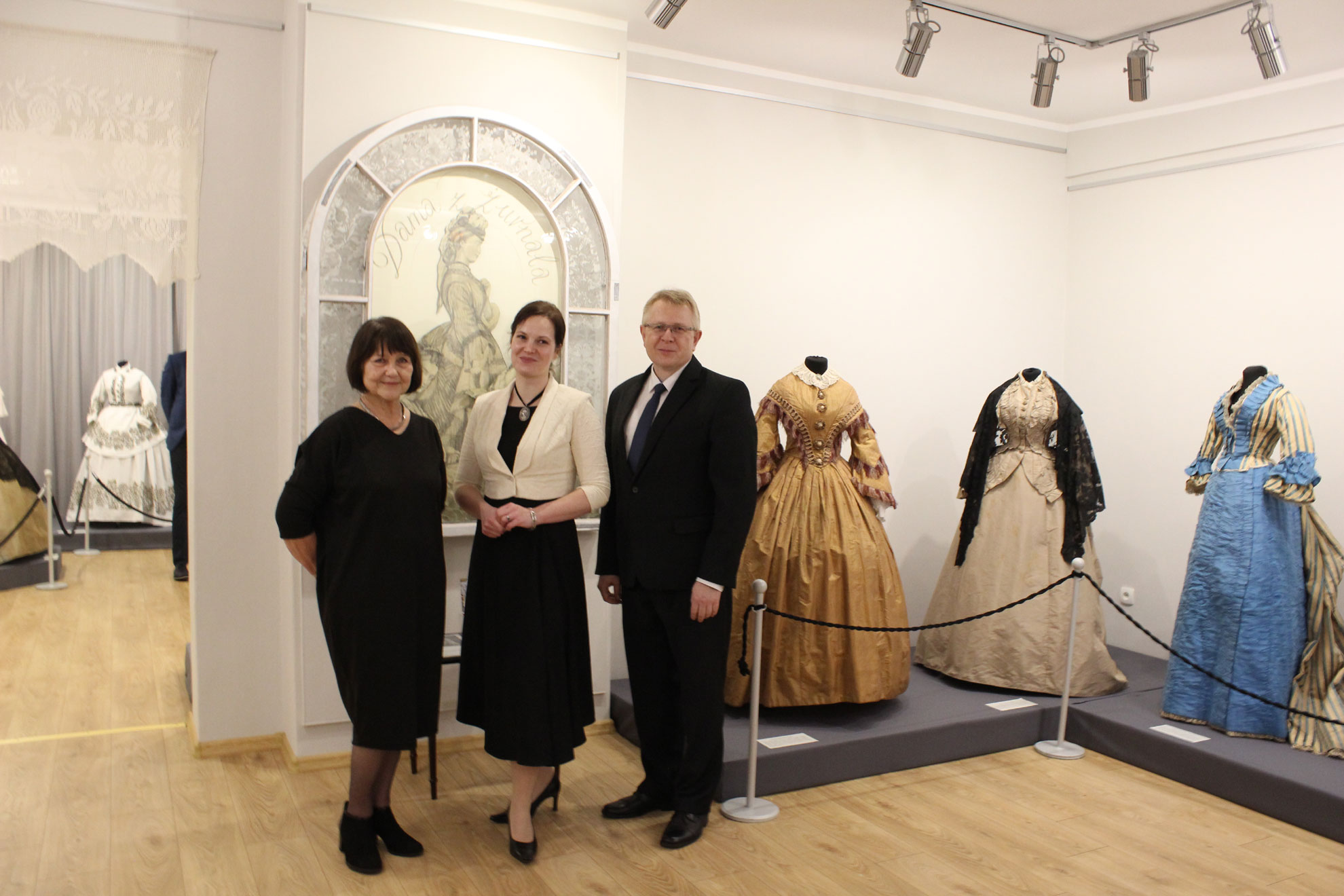
Vernissage of the exhibition in Nowa Sol Museum, PL

== See also ==
- Poznan
- History of Fashion Design
- 19th century in fashion
- Museums in Poland
