= Poznań Croissant Museum =

Museum in Poznań, Poland

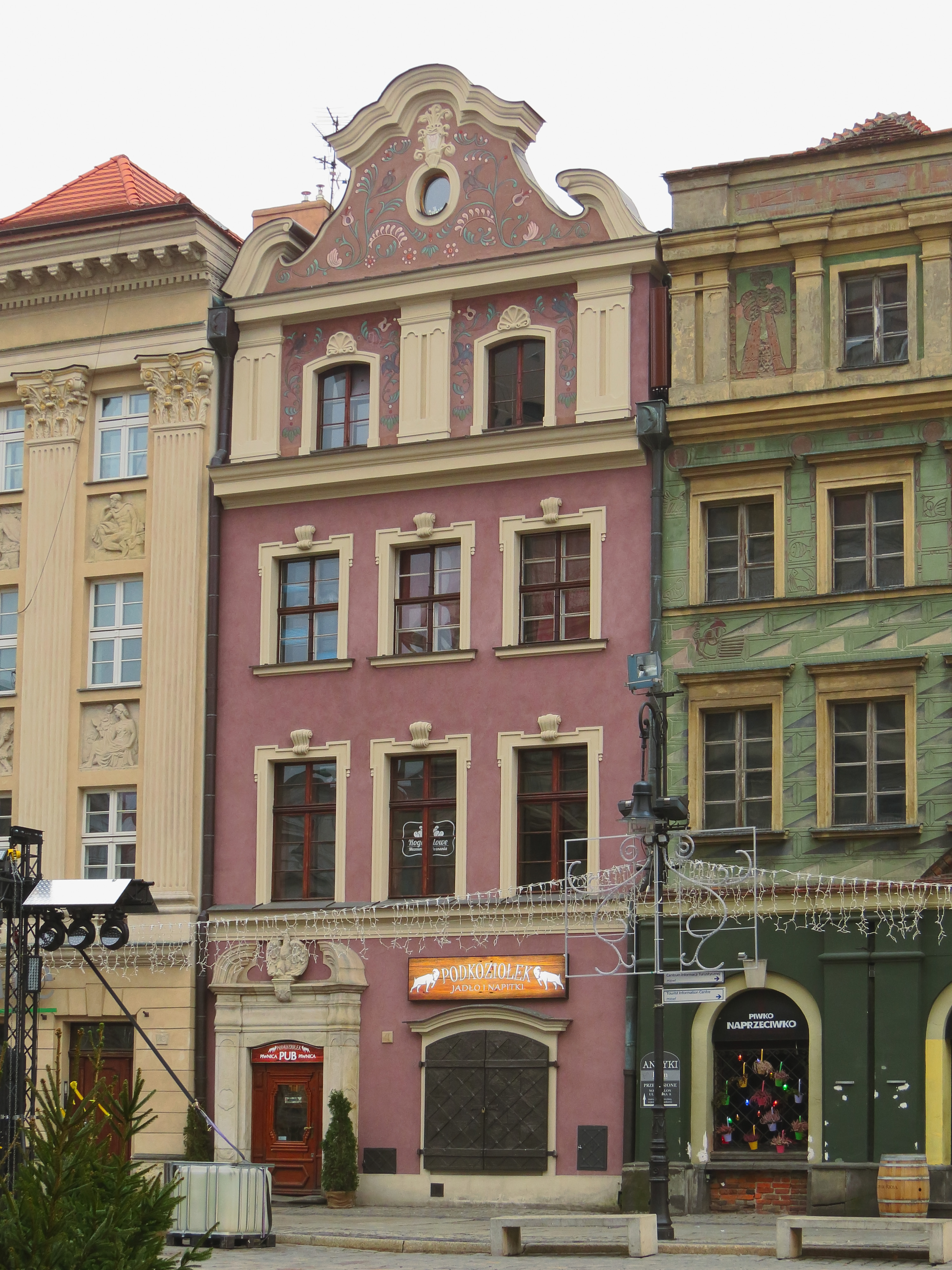
- Rogalowe Muzeum Poznania
- Location: Poznań, Poland
- Coordinates: 52°24′N 16°54′E

Rogalowe Muzeum Poznania is a museum of St. Martin's croissants, located in Poznań, at 41 Stary Rynek.

The museum is dedicated to the tradition of baking croissants, already 150 years old. Visiting the museum is interactive. During the show, visitors can learn how to produce a croissant according to the original recipe. The museum aims to promote Poznań culture and history, whose most characteristic elements are: Świętomarcińskie croissants, Poznań dialect and goats on the tower of the Town Hall. The Museum was founded by Szymon Walter.

== Gallery ==
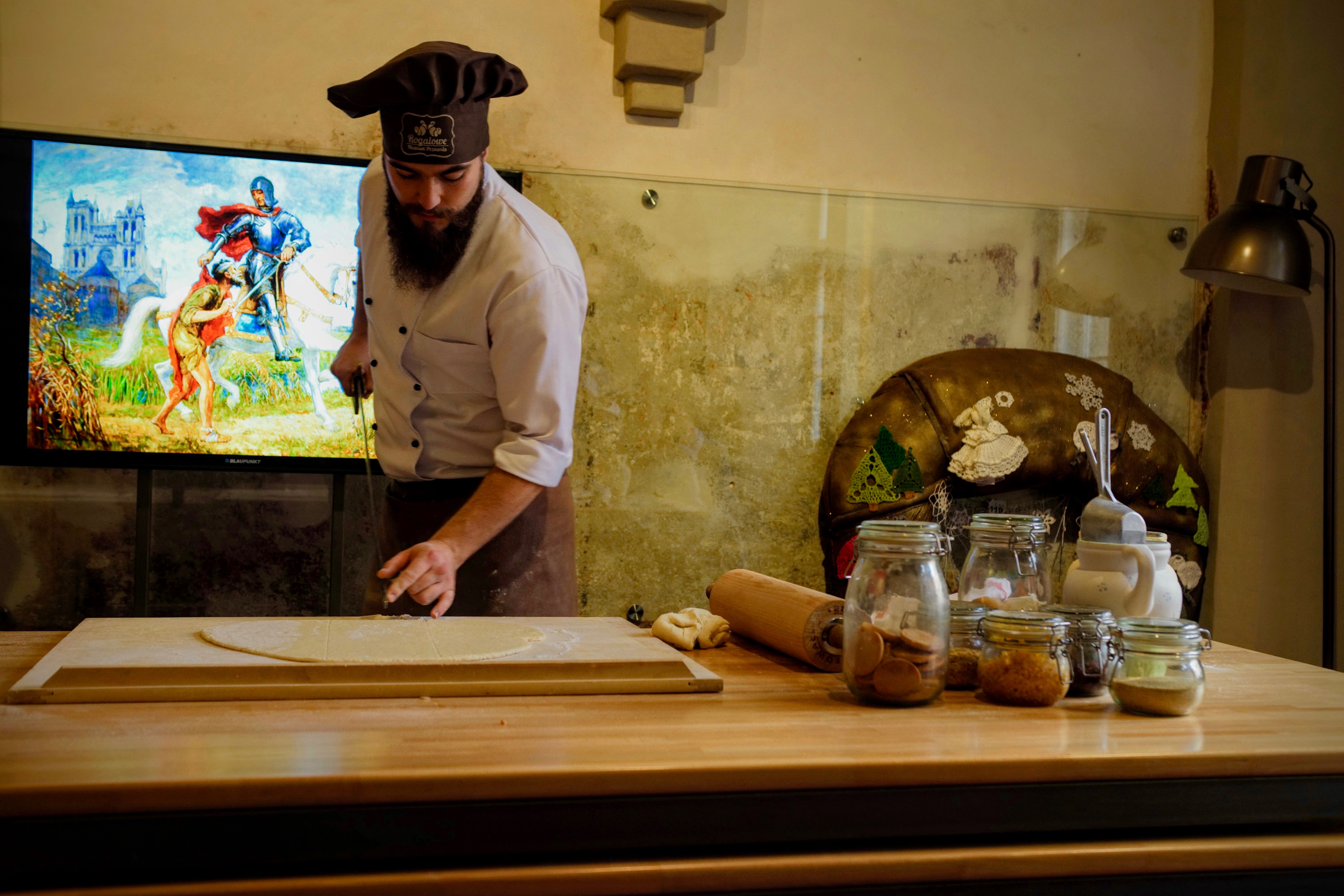
Croissant making show

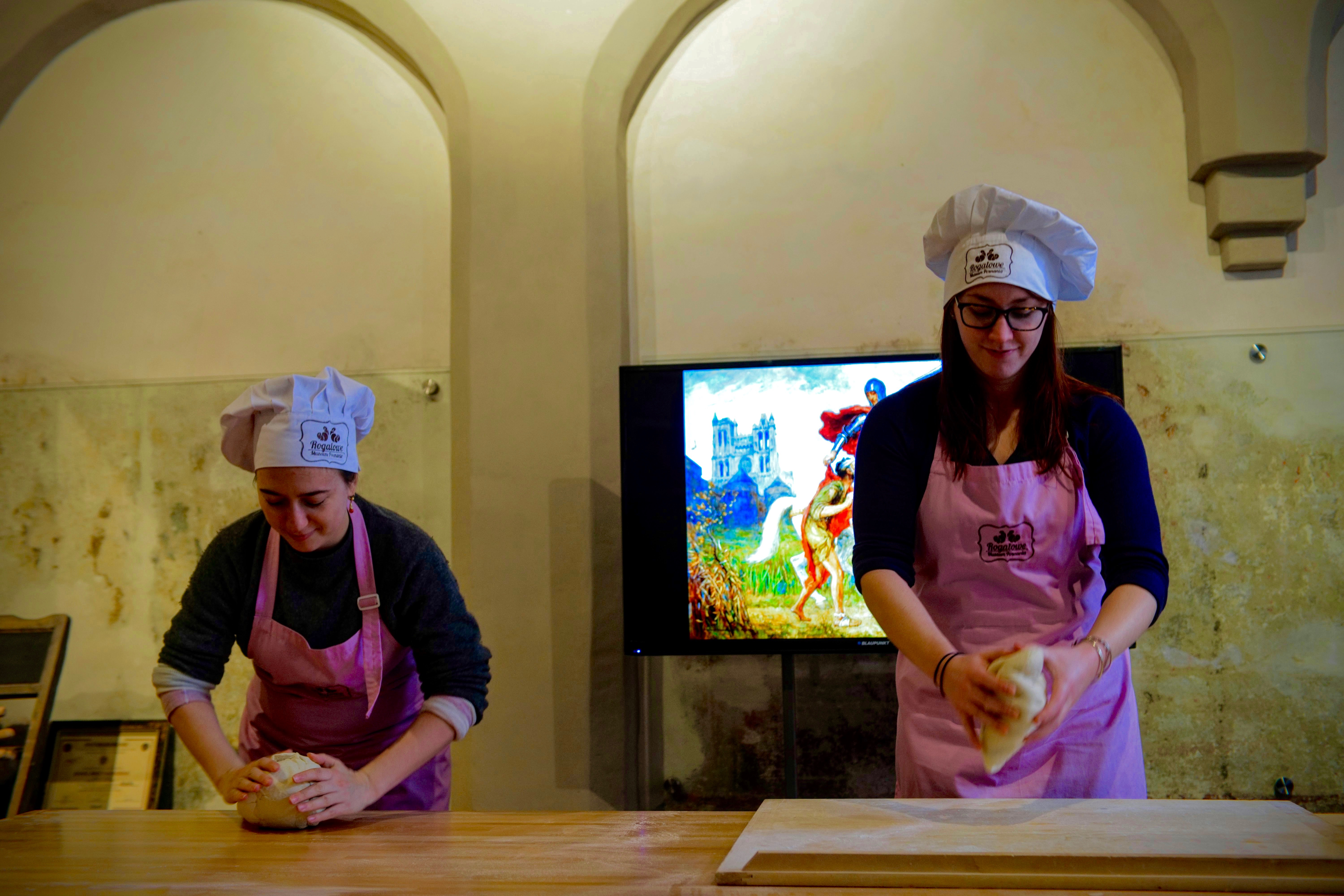
Croissant making show

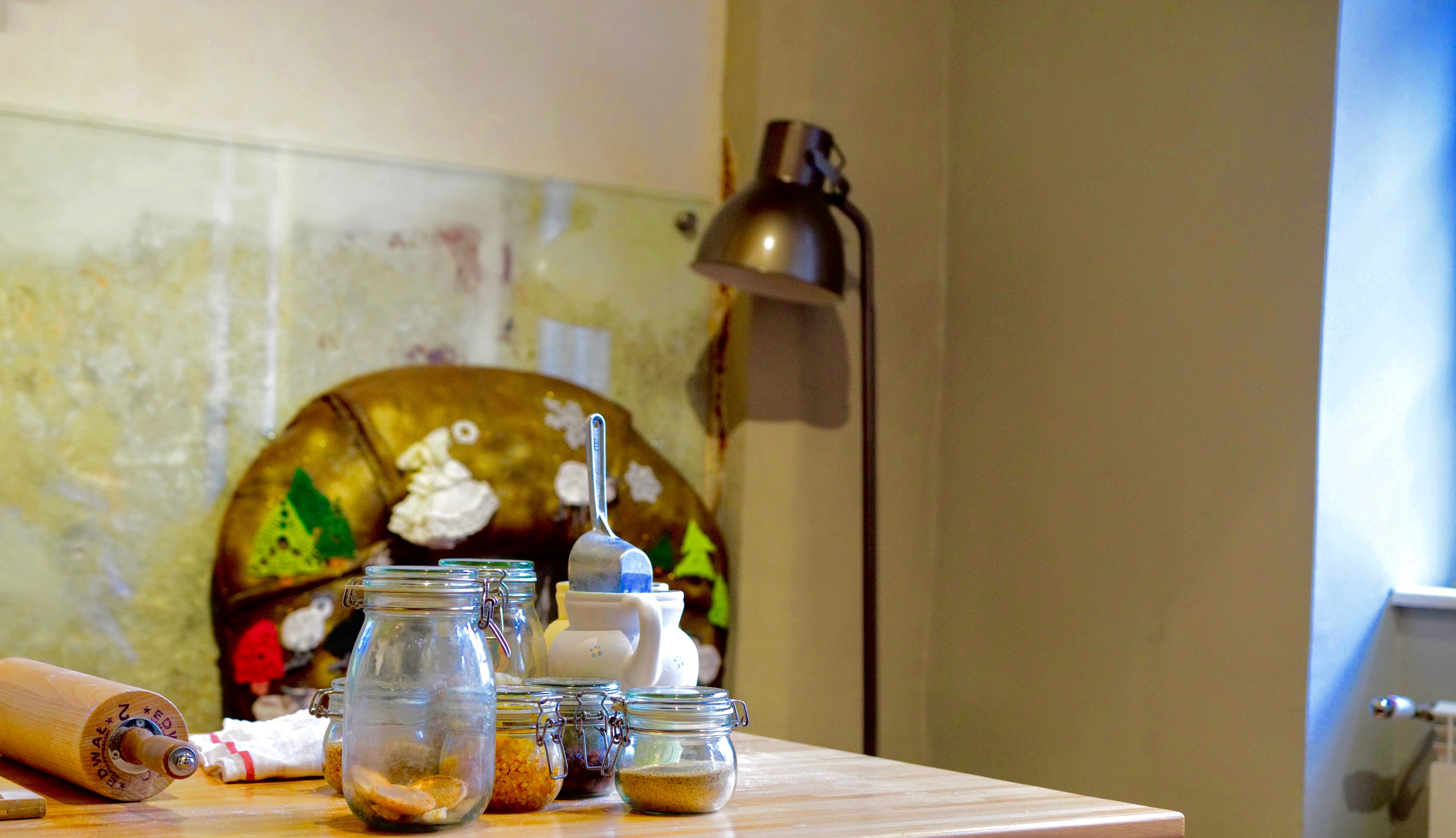
Croissant making show

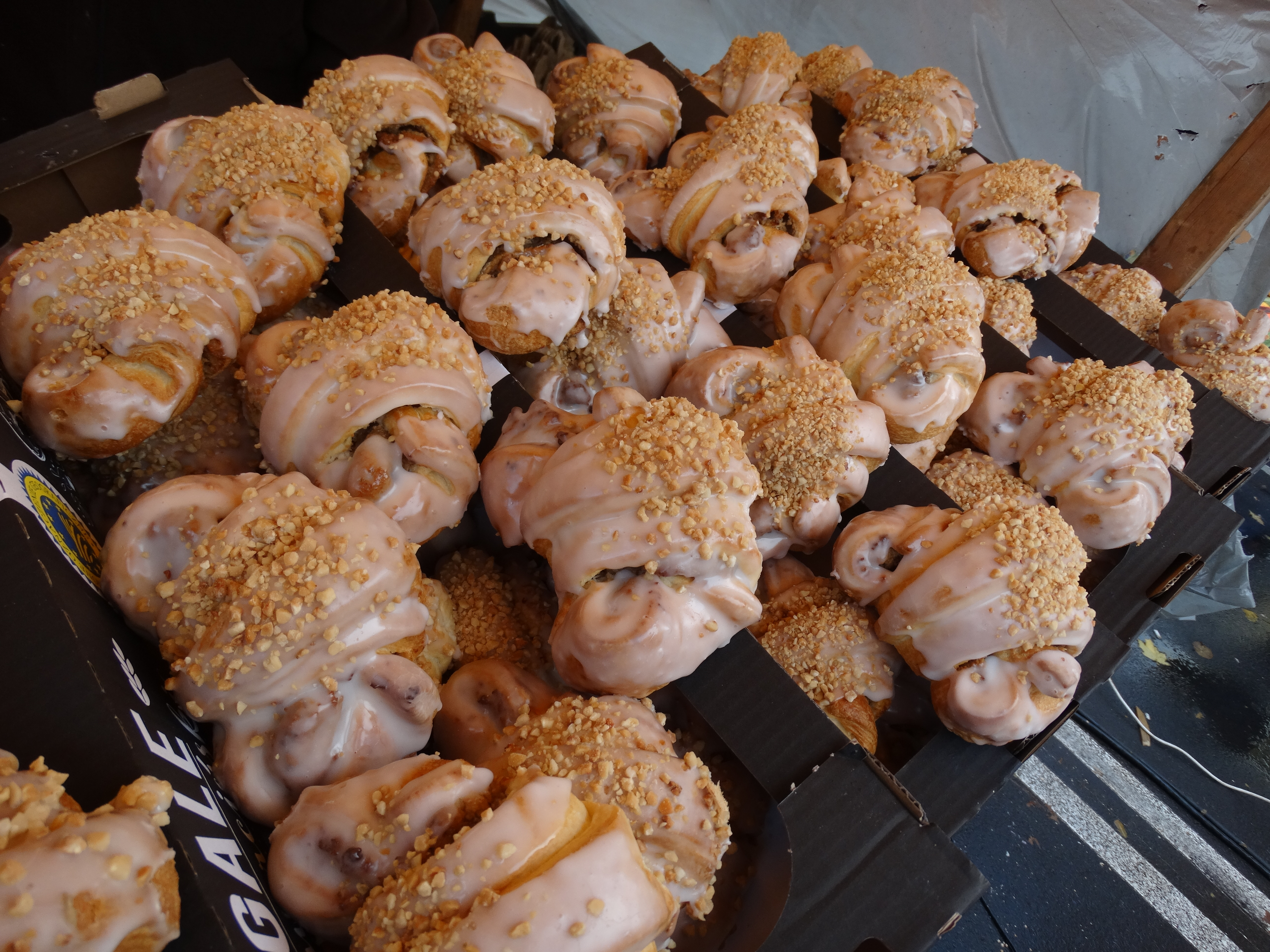
St. Martin's croissants
