= Shelter of the Mayor of Poznań =

- Schron Prezydenta Poznania
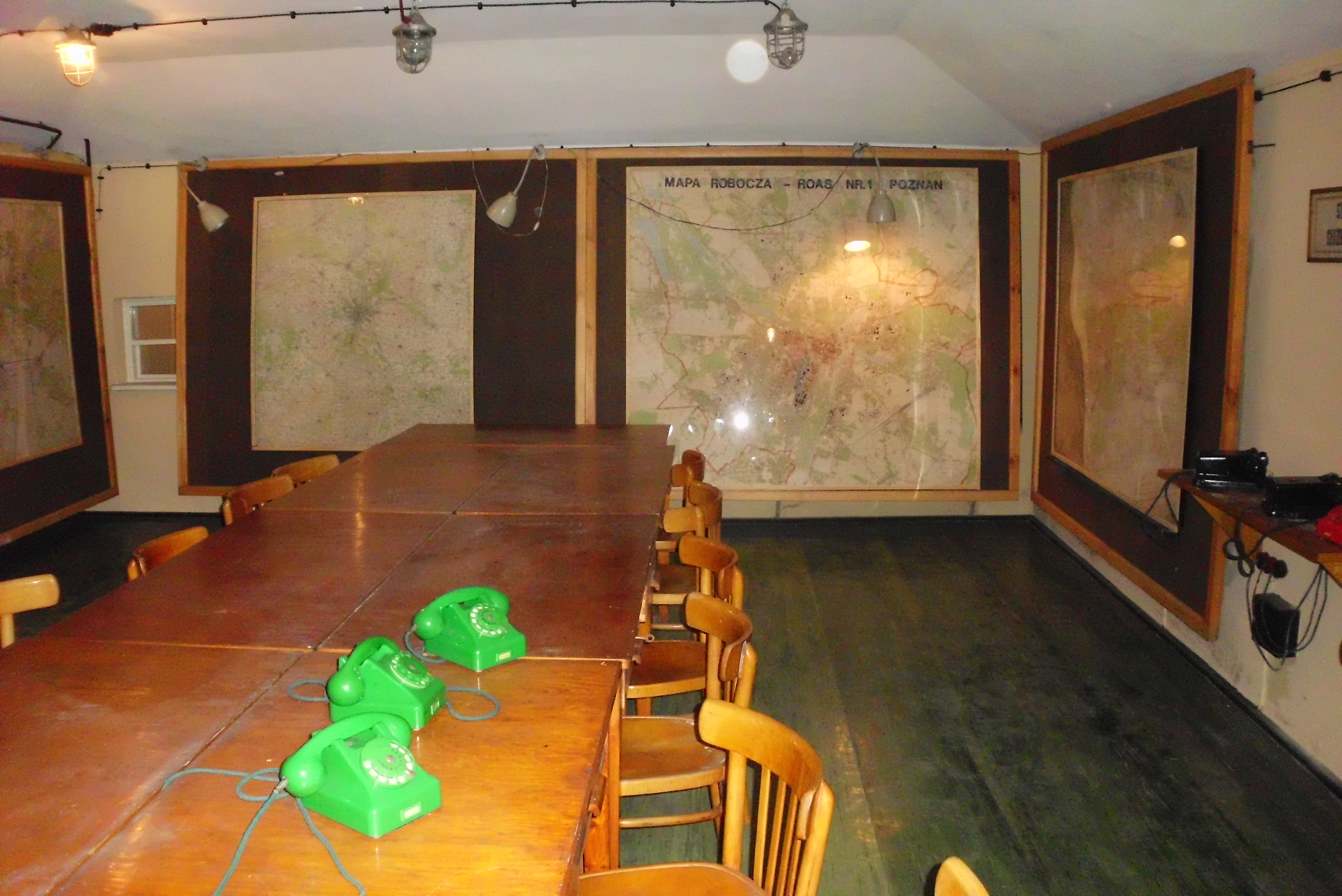
- The map room of the shelter

- Location within Poland
- Location: Poznań, Greater Poland Voivodeship, Poland
- Coordinates: 52.441262°N 16.807773°E
- Type: Former fallout shelter

The Poznań mayoral shelter was built in Poland in the late 1950s and early 1960s to provide protection for the mayor of Poznań and other high-ranking municipal officials in the event of a nuclear war but has since been put out of commission, becoming a branch of the Wielkopolska Museum of the Fight for Independence in Poznań.

== History ==
Located under a villa at 62 Słupska Street, the shelter has a total area of around 500 m^{2}. Its walls and ceiling are respectively 1 meter and 2 meters thick. It consists of mechanical rooms with a water intake system, a ventilation system, and a generator, bedrooms, offices, a telephone exchange, and a coordination centre, from which the mayor was to lead civil defence actions, alarming civilians of any hazards through the use of sirens scattered around the city and commanding evacuation if need be.

The existence of this shelter was classified until 2000. It was announced publicly in 2010, with its location being disclosed two years later. On December 13, 2012, the 31st anniversary of the proclamation of martial law in Poland, it was opened for visitors for the first time; it was also opened on December 21, 2012, the predicted day of the end of the world.

Workers of the Museum of the Fight for Independence believe that the shelter wouldn't provide the needed protection or prove itself as a command center because of the shallow location, the lack of kitchens and food storage, and the fact that communication with the outside world wouldn't be possible after a nuclear explosion.
