= History of Poznań =

Polish municipal history

Poznań, today Poland's fifth largest city, is also one of the country's oldest cities, and was an important political and religious center in the early Polish state of the 10th century. Poznań Cathedral is the oldest church in the country, containing the tombs of the first Polish rulers, Duke Mieszko I and King Bolesław I Chrobry.

Although the centre of national political power moved to Kraków in the 11th century, and later to Warsaw, Poznań remained an important regional center, being the chief city of the Greater Poland (Wielkopolska) region. It came under Prussian (later German) rule for most of the period from 1793 to 1918, during which it expanded significantly, and was also heavily fortified. The city resumed its role as a Polish voivodeship capital in the Second Polish Republic, and later, following the 1939–1945 Nazi German occupation, in the communist Polish People's Republic. Since 1999 Poznań has been the capital of Greater Poland Voivodeship.

== Early times and Piast Poland (to 1138) ==
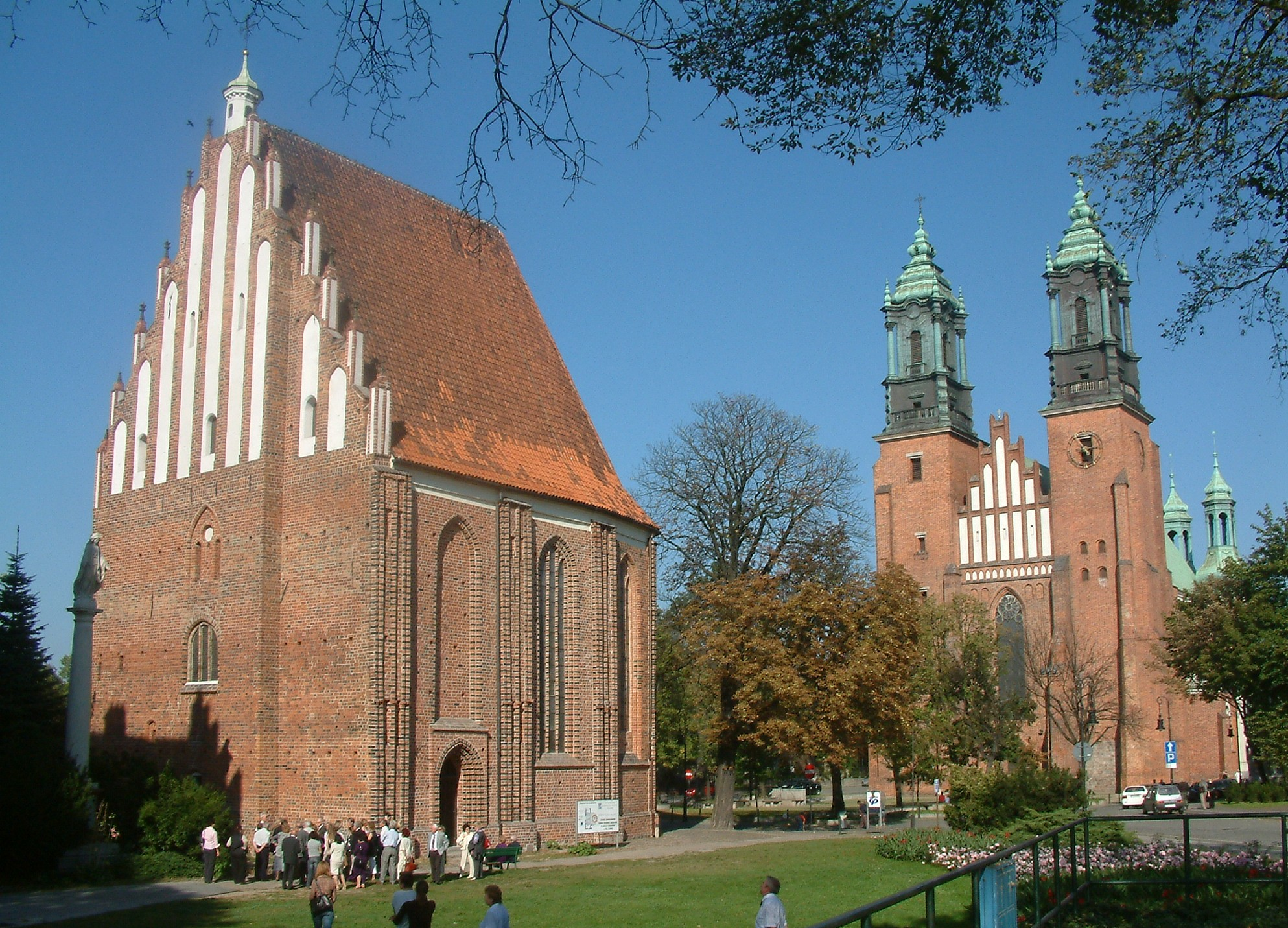
Poznań Cathedral in 2006, with the Church of Our Lady in the foreground, standing on the site of the original ducal palace

The first settlements in and near-by what is now Poznań can be traced to the late period of the Stone Age. Later various cultures developed there in the Bronze Age and Iron Age. Famous are the originally Bronze Age burial mounds at Łęki Małe, built between 2150 BC and 1800 BCE during the Únětice Culture. By the mid 20th century, nine mounds were still visible, and originally there were probably 14 mounds.

A recent study, based on a multi-proxy approach using cores from Lake Wonieść, has demonstrated the complex settlement history with changing intensities in the Poznań region throughout prehistory. Around 5250 BCE, people attributed to the Linear Pottery Culture settled in the areas of chernozem soil. A significant opening of the landscape took place during the Funnel Beaker Period from 3800 BCE. There are several boom and bust phases that correspond to archaeological complexes. For example, a boom phase appears in the records around 2150 BCE, when Early Bronze Age settlements began to appear and sites such as Bruszczewo and Łęki Małe were initiated. A bust phase appears around 1690-1640 BC, when the huge Bruszczewo settlement was abandoned.

Poznań began as a stronghold built in the 8th or 9th century AD between branches of the Warta and Cybina rivers, on what is now called Ostrów Tumski ("Cathedral Island"). Various other settlements sprang up nearby on the islands and on both banks of the Warta. In the 10th century the tribe inhabiting the region, the Polans, became dominant over other tribes in most of the area of today's Poland. Consequently, this early Polish state, ruled by Duke Mieszko I and his successors in the Piast dynasty, was centred politically on Poznań and the neighbouring Polan strongholds, particularly Gniezno and Giecz. Archaeological research shows that in the late 10th century Poznań had a ducal palace (where the Church of Our Lady now stands, opposite the cathedral), with a chapel, possibly built for Mieszko's Christian wife Dobrawa. The ceremony by which Mieszko converted to Christianity in 966, known as the Baptism of Poland, is likely to have taken place at Poznań.

Following the conversion, in 968 Poland received its first missionary bishop, Jordan, who is believed to have used Poznań as his seat. Construction began of Poznań's cathedral. This was originally built in an early Romanesque style, and as Poland's first cathedral had St. Peter as its patron. The first rulers of Piast Poland – Mieszko I, Bolesław I and Mieszko II – are buried beneath the cathedral.

Gniezno was created an archbishopric at the Congress of Gniezno in 1000, by agreement between Bolesław I and Holy Roman Emperor Otto III. However Jordan's successor Unger remained as Bishop of Poznań independent of Gniezno, although it is not clear whether this continued to be a missionary bishopric subordinate to the Pope, or was attached to the Bishopric of Magdeburg.

With Mieszko II's death in 1034, which probably occurred in Poznań (and may have been the result of an aristocratic plot), the country entered a period of anarchy and pagan reaction, which caused much devastation in the region. In 1038 Bretislaus I, Duke of Bohemia invaded, sacking and destroying Poznań and Gniezno. When Poland's unity was restored by Casimir the Restorer in 1039, the capital was moved to Kraków, which had been relatively undamaged by the troubles. Poznań and Gniezno were rebuilt, and in spite of the decline in the region's political importance, Poznań remained an important economic center.

== In the period of fragmentation of Poland (1138–1320) ==
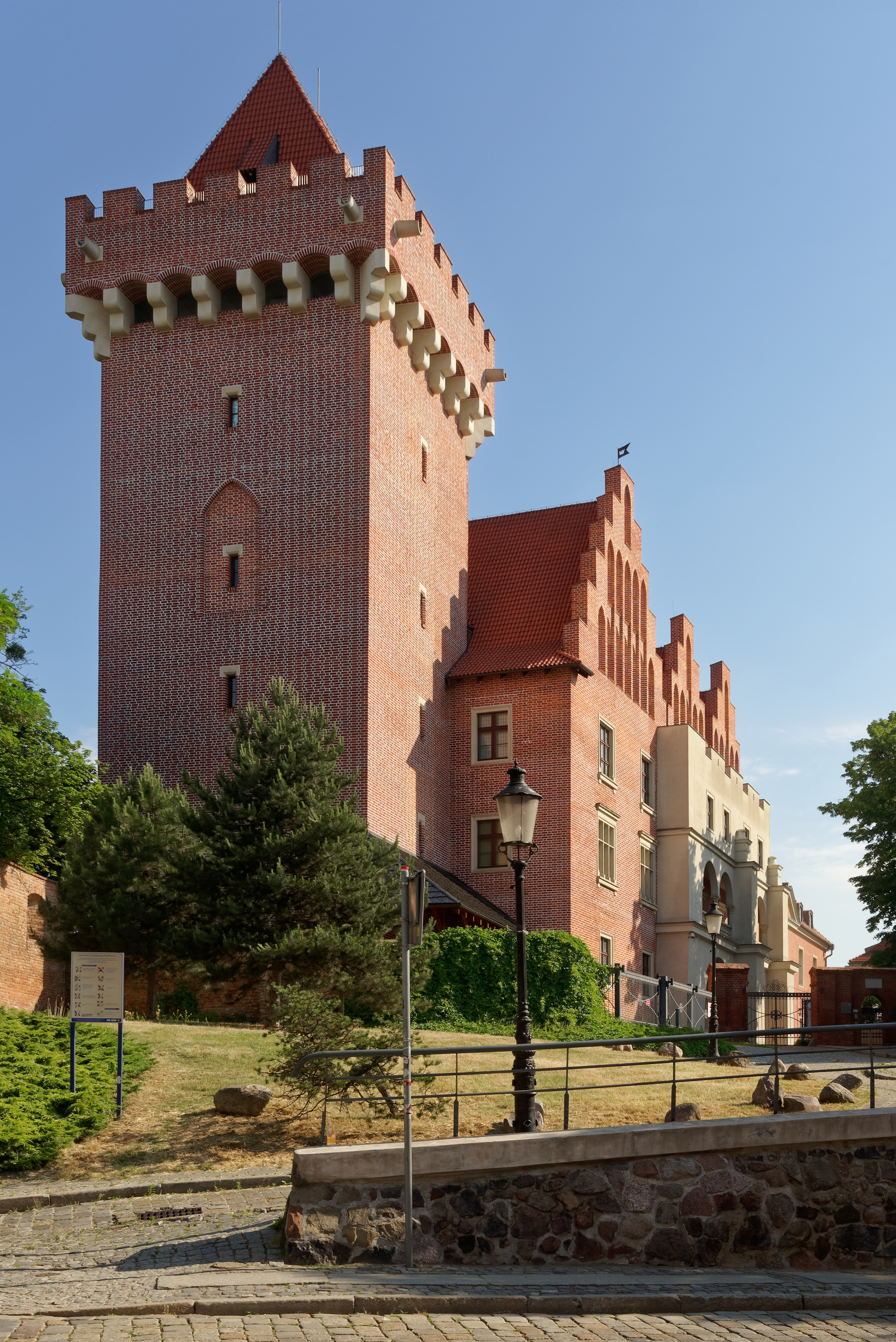
Royal Castle

Under the testament of Bolesław III, in 1138 Poland was divided into separate duchies under the late king's sons. Poznań and its surrounding region (though without Gniezno and Kalisz) became the domain of Mieszko III the Old, the first of the Dukes of Greater Poland. The period saw much turbulence and fighting among the dukes, with the duchies and their subdivisions (such as the duchies of Poznań, Gniezno and Kalisz) frequently changing hands. Mieszko was High Duke of all Poland at various times between 1173 and his death in 1202, by which time he had also gained control of Gniezno and Kalisz, thus making Poznań a centre of power in a region covering the whole of Greater Poland. However the instability would continue throughout the 13th century.

Poznań at this time was still essentially the stronghold on the cathedral island. However, by the end of the 12th century various trade and craft settlements had developed around it, including those of St. Gotard, St. Martin and St. Adalbert (Wojciech) on the left bank of the Warta river, and Śródka on the right bank. The name Śródka derived from the Wednesday markets which were held there (środa is Polish for "Wednesday"). Beyond Śródka was the Church of St. John (formerly of St. Michael), and beyond that a settlement which would become known as Komandoria (after the commander of the Knights Hospitallers, to whom the church was granted in 1187).

The main arena of development, though, was the left bank. In about 1249, Duke Przemysł I began constructing a residence and castle on what is now called Przemysł Hill – this would become the Royal Castle. Przemysł also acquired the settlement of St. Gotard from the bishopric, in exchange for that of St. Adalbert, with the intention of founding a town there. In 1253 a charter was given by Przemysł (and his brother Bolesław the Pious) for the founding of a town under Magdeburg law. The charter was issued to Thomas of Gubin, who in the following years brought many German settlers to aid in the building. This city covered the area of Poznań's present-day Old Town neighbourhood, centred on the Market Square (now Stary Rynek). Under Duke Przemysł II, the castle was strengthened and the new city surrounded with a wall, integrated with the castle (which stood at the eastern end of the town).

Przemysł II was crowned king of Poland in 1295, and thus the castle became a royal residence. However, after the king's murder in Rogoźno the following year, the conflict and instability resumed. In 1314 Poznań finally came under the control of Władysław I the Elbow-high, who was crowned king of a reunited Poland in 1320, bringing the period of fragmentation to an end.

== In Poland and the Commonwealth (1320–1793) ==
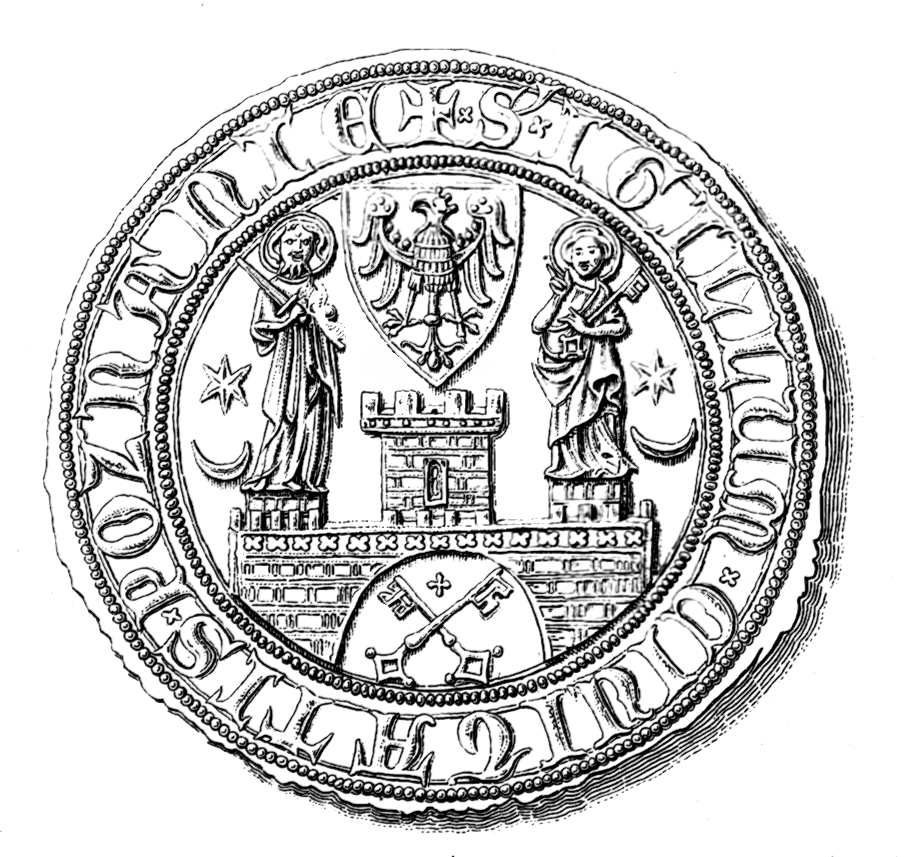
14th-century seal showing Poznań's coat of arms

In the reunited Poland (and later in the Polish–Lithuanian Commonwealth) Poznań became the seat of a voivodeship, although within the Greater Poland region Kalisz was initially of greater importance, lying on the route from Silesia to Toruń and Gdańsk. In 1331 Poznań withstood a siege by forces of John of Bohemia. With the start of the Jagiellonian period Poznań began to grow in importance, as it lay on the trading route from Lithuania and Ruthenia to western Europe. King Władysław II Jagiełło granted and confirmed numerous privileges on the city, which continued to grow in importance under his successors. Most of the surrounding settlements on the left-bank of the Warta belonged to the city, while the cathedral island (Ostrów Tumski) and the right bank formed the bishop's possessions. Separate town rights were bestowed on Ostrów Tumski sometime before 1335, Śródka in 1425 (its western end, Ostrówek, would form a separate town), and Chwaliszewo (then a separate island) in 1444.

The city also suffered from frequent epidemics of disease, which slowed the growth of the population. It also suffered a number of fires (particularly in 1386, 1447, 1459, 1464, 1536 and 1590), which increased the popularity of brick over wood as a building material. Floods were another frequent problem. The city's fortifications were strengthened from 1431 onwards, with the addition of wall towers, a tall observation tower and a second line of walls, a moat being created between the two lines.

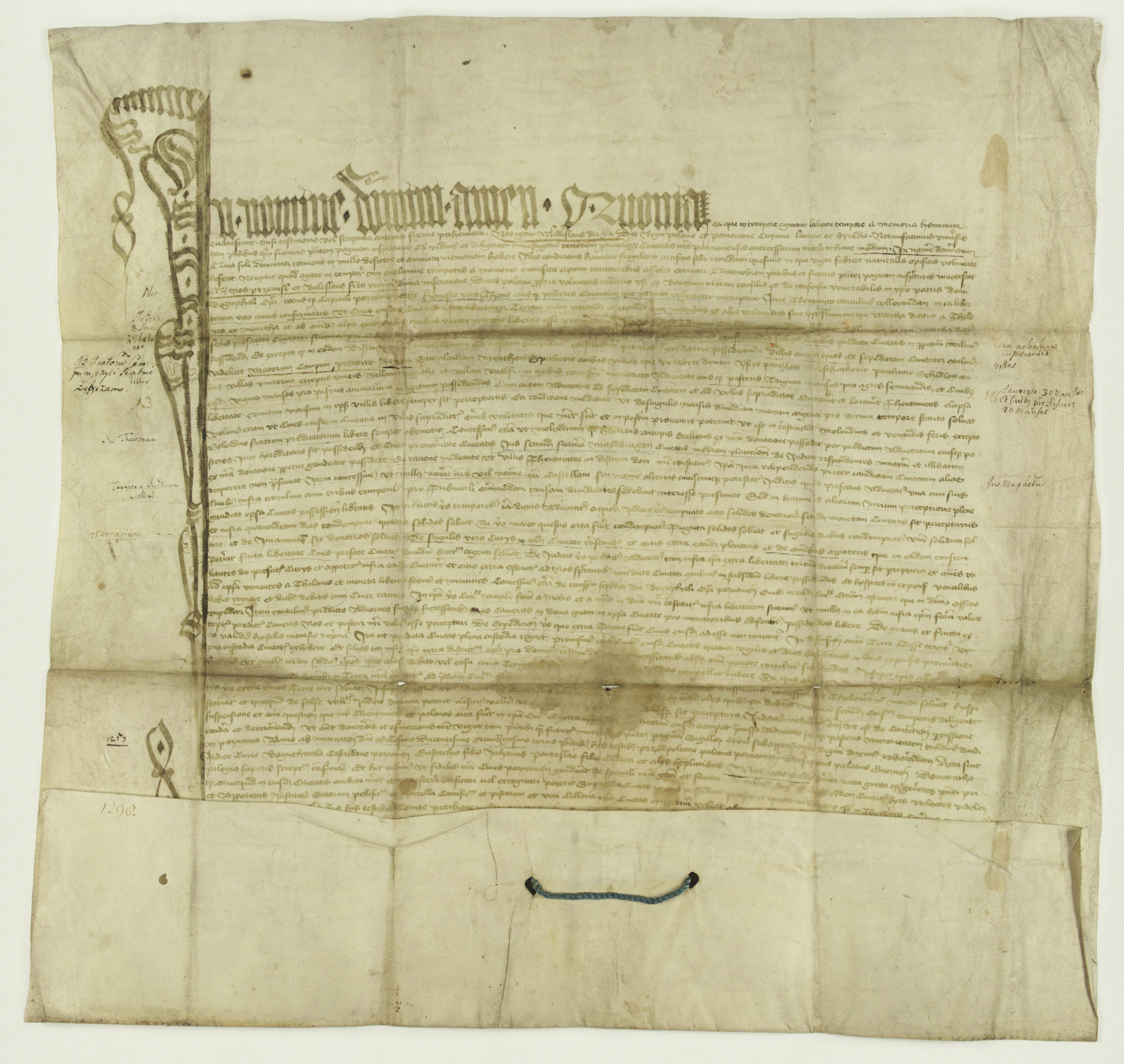
King Władysław III of Poland confirms the city rights of Poznań, 1443

The city had a significant Jewish community, which had probably existed since the mid 13th century, although the first documentary record of them dates from 1367, by which time Poznań already had a synagogue. The Jewish quarter was in the north-east of the walled city, around the street called ulica Żydowska ("Jewish Street"), known as ul. Tkacka ("Weavers' Street") before the 15th century.

The Lubrański Academy was founded in Poznań in 1519, Poland's second institution of higher education after the Jagiellonian University, although it did not have the right to award academic degrees.

In 1536 the city suffered a major fire. The town hall was one of the buildings affected; the damage led to a major redesign and reconstruction of the building in 1550–1560, under the direction of Giovanni Battista di Quadro.

In 1549 it is recorded that there were 550 houses belonging to the townspeople, 86 belonging to Jews, about 30 belonging to nobles and a similar number belonging to clergy. Many craftsmen by that time had moved to the settlements outside the city walls, leading to an increase in the number of residential buildings in the city. However many of the nobles' and clergy's possessions, both within and outside the walls, had the status of jurydyka, which placed them outside the control of the city and thus reduced the city's revenues and power. The Jewish quarter was also self-governing. It is estimated that the conurbation's population in this period was approximately 20,000, of which 8,000 lived within the city walls. However the population was subject to large fluctuations due to fires, floods and outbreaks of disease.

At the end of the 16th century Poznań was a major centre for the fur and leather trade, particularly in skins coming from Lithuania and Russia.

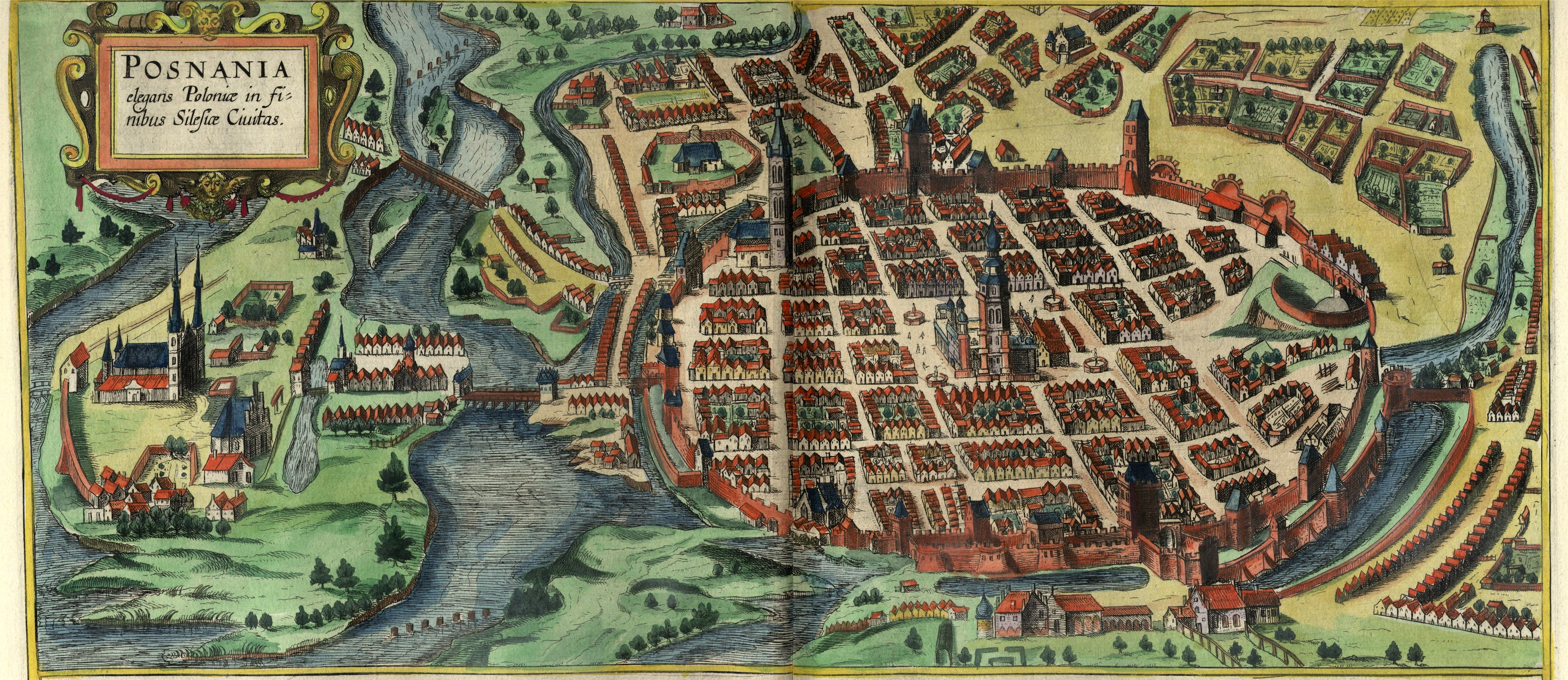
View of Poznań from the north, with the cathedral island to the left and the walled city, surrounded by suburban settlements, to the right (Civitates Orbis Terrarum, Cologne 1618)

During the free election period in Poland, Poznań, as one of the most influential cities of the state, enjoyed voting rights.

Attempts were made to introduce Protestantism to the city in the second half of the 16th century, but this involved mainly the nobility, the bulk of the population remaining Roman Catholic. The largest Protestant congregation, the German-speaking Lutherans, numbered 2,300 to 2,400 at the end of the century, of whom only about 600 lived within the city walls. The Catholic Church's Counter-Reformation efforts included the founding of a Jesuits' College in the city in 1571, under the rectorship of Jakub Wujek. This institution gained the right to award academic degrees in 1611, and existed until the abolition of the order and merger with the Lubrański Academy in 1780.

From the second half of the 17th century Poznań, like Poland as a whole, suffered from a series of invasions and other disasters. The city was occupied by a Swedish army in 1655 during the Second Northern War, replaced by Brandenburgians in 1656 (the Swedes burned the suburbs when they left). The Brandenburgian garrison surrendered after a two-month siege in 1657, which left the city devastated. There were also many deaths from plague during this time. In the Third Northern War Poznań was again occupied by a Swedish army, from 1703–1709, and became the main centre of the pro-Swedish movement in the country. After 1709 the city was occupied by Saxon forces, who looted much property; there were also further outbreaks of plague until 1711. The city was captured by forces of the Tarnogród Confederation in 1716, which led to further plundering. Russian forces arrived in the region in the same year (remaining until 1719), but accepted payment not to enter the city.

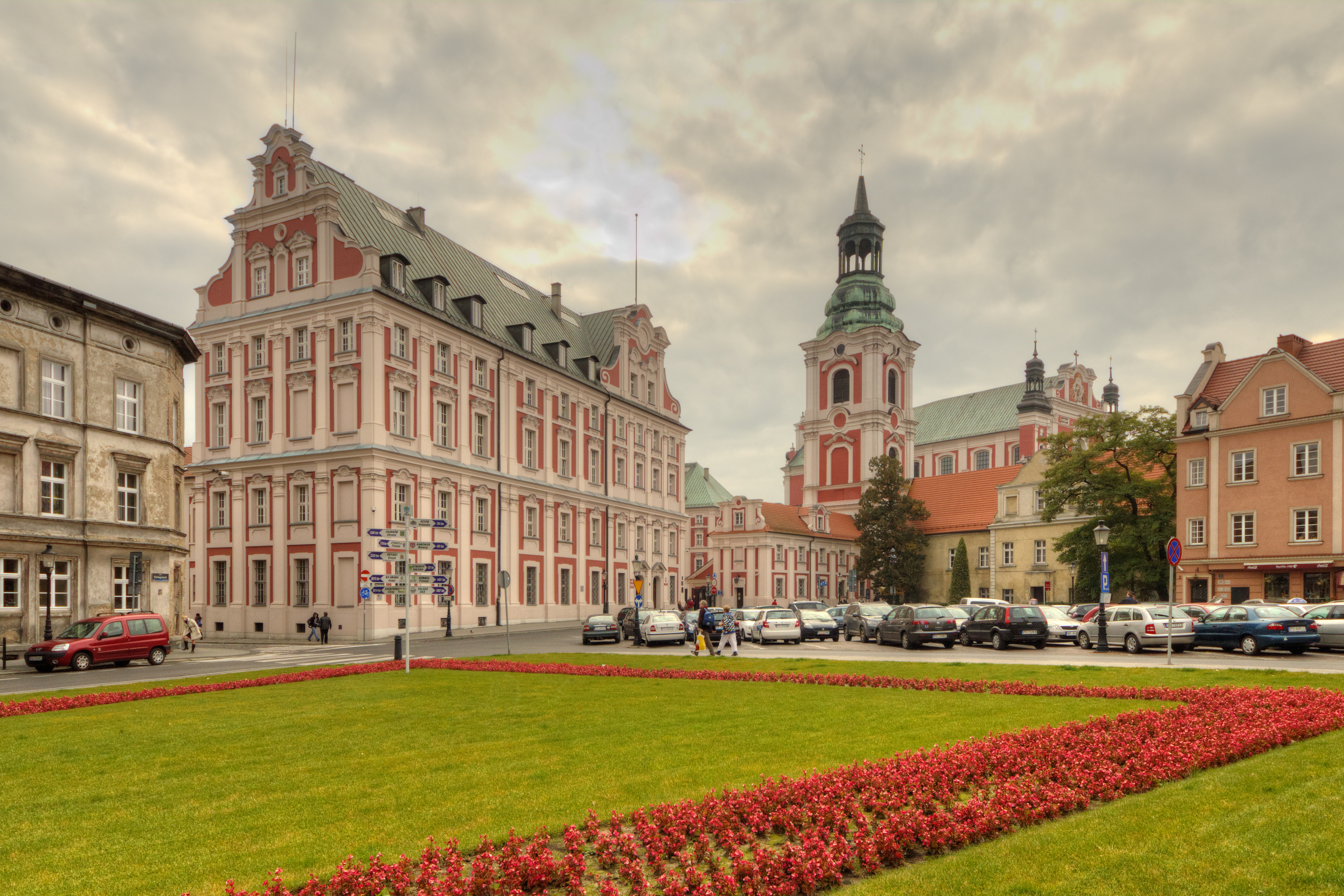
The Jesuit College, built in years 1701-1733

A fire of 16 March 1717 spread from the Jewish quarter to the whole of the city; alleged failure of the Jews to allow fire-fighting efforts led to anti-Semitic sentiment. King August II was unwilling to assist the rebuilding of the city after these disasters; in 1728 30% of houses remained in disrepair. In 1733–1735 the city again suffered from the frequent presence of military forces during the War of the Polish Succession. This was followed by a flood of 1736, which destroyed almost all of the suburban buildings. In 1719–1753 Poznań absorbed several waves of rural settlers from Bamberg (Bambrzy), invited by the city authorities to rebuild the devastated suburbs. There were also significant groups of Dutch settlers (Olędrzy).

In spite of Poland's non-involvement, Poznań was affected by the Seven Years' War, because of its strategic location. Russian and Prussian troops alternately occupied the city from 1758 until 1763. There was much looting of property by the occupiers, and during the time of Prussian control the townspeople were forced to sell goods at vastly reduced prices or for counterfeit money. The city received no assistance from the Polish government of August III during these events, and the election of Stanisław August Poniatowski to the throne in 1764 was widely welcomed. However Poznań again suffered military occupation and conflict during the events involving the Bar Confederation, with Russian troops occupying the city in 1768–1769, followed by confederate troops in 1769–1770, Russians again in 1770–1771, Prussians in 1771–1773 (withdrawing after the First Partition of Poland had been ratified), and Russian troops again in 1773–1775.

Various Polish Crown Army units were stationed in the city at various times, including the Prince Frederick Mounted Regiment, 1st, 7th and 9th Polish Infantry Regiments and the 2nd Polish Artillery Brigade.

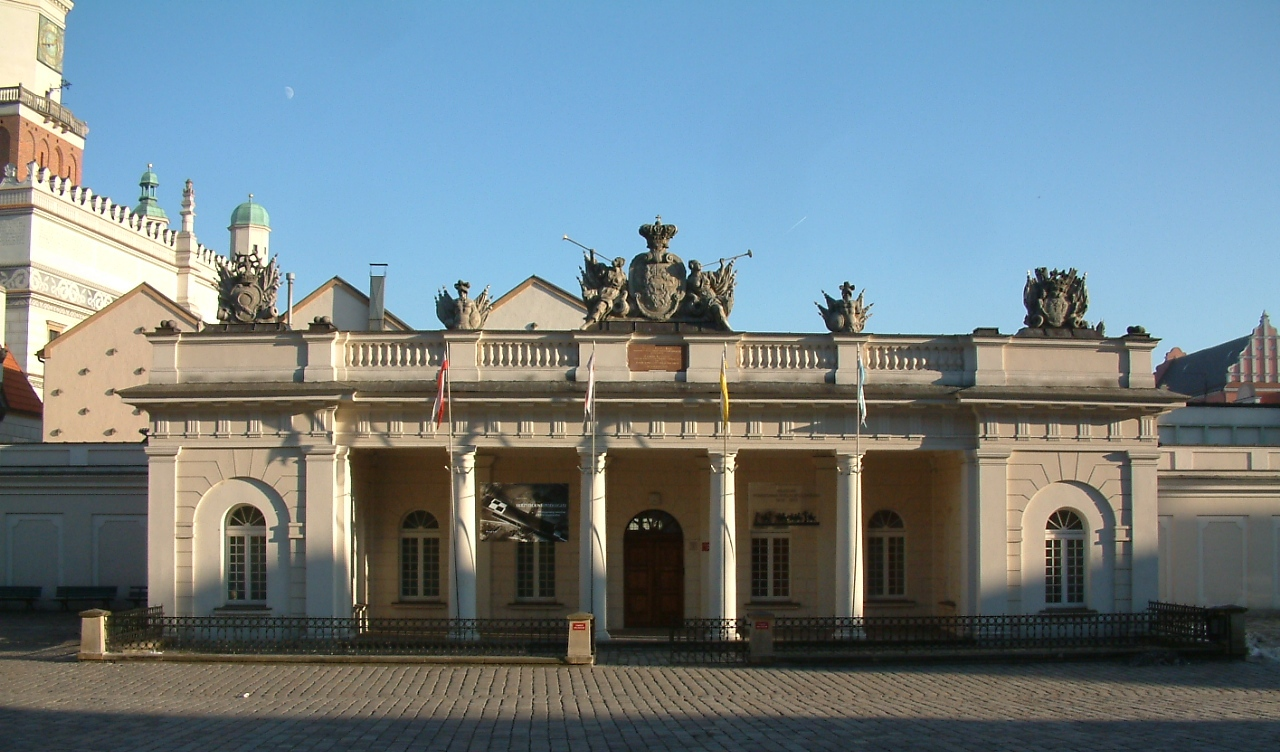
The Guardhouse, built in years 1783-1787

In 1778 a "Committee of Good Order" (Komisja Dobrego Porządku) was established in Poznań (a type of body introduced by acts of the Sejm in 1764 and 1768, to oversee the restoration of the kingdom's cities). Poznań's committee was headed by Kazimierz Raczyński, a former general, starosta of Wielkopolska and crown official. One of its first acts was to take an inventory, which showed that within the city walls there were 390 residential buildings (80% of them brick-built), and 57 public buildings (including the three main gates and around 30 wall towers). There were also 8 abbeys, 9 Catholic churches, a Protestant congregation and a synagogue. The Committee organized repairs and improvements to buildings, construction of buildings on unbuilt land, the building of a new wall, improvements to streets, and the removal of mills from the river to make it navigable. It also reformed the city government and attempted (with partial success) to bring the jurydyki under the city's control.

In the events leading to the Second Partition of Poland, Poznań was occupied by a Prussian army on 31 January 1793. On 10 June an order was given that all Polish offices of government were to cease their activity by 4 July. Thus Poznań (or Posen, as it was known in German), along with all of Greater Poland, came under the control of Prussia.

== In the Prussian Partition for the first time (1793–1807) ==
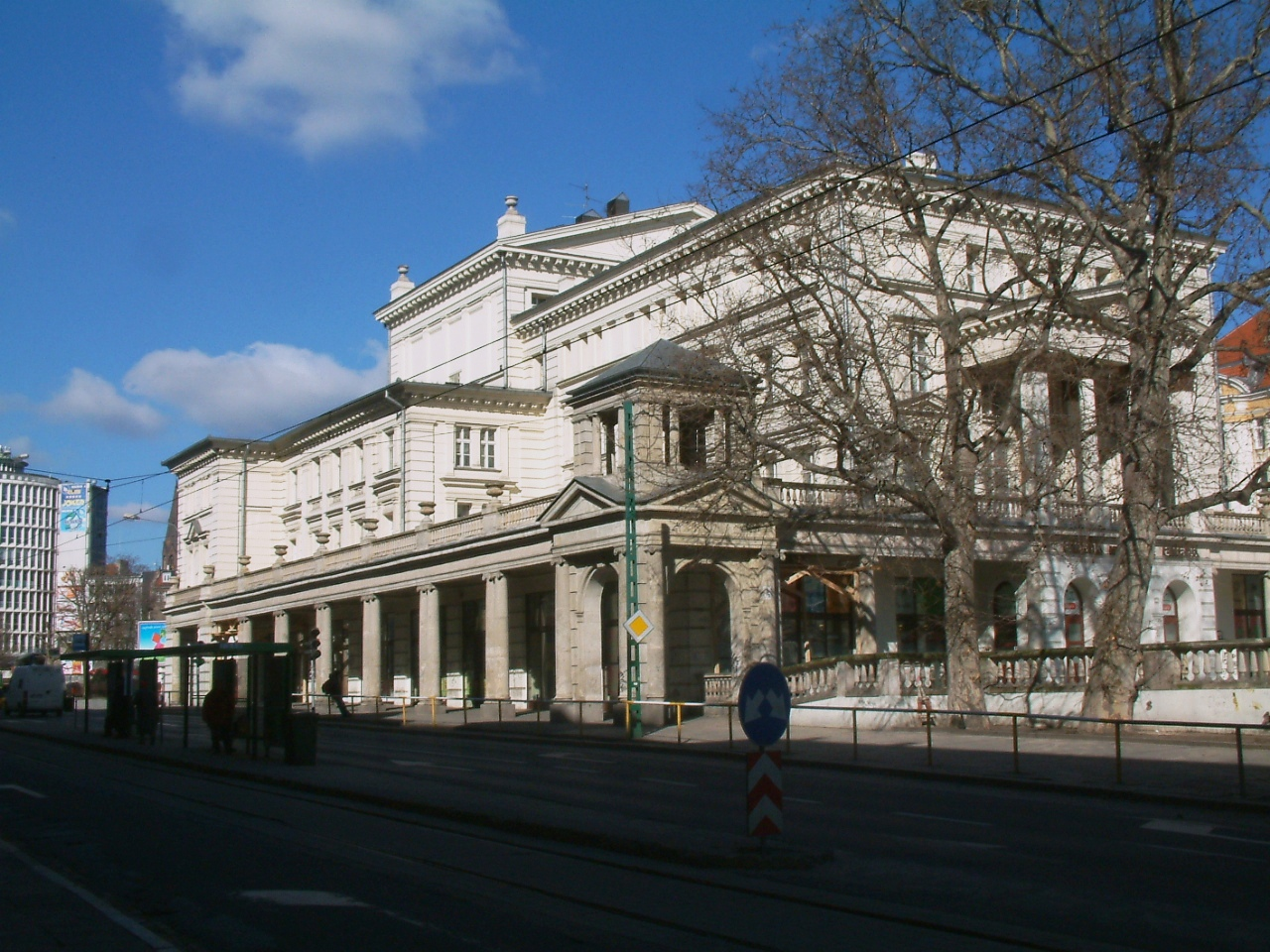
Arkadia, built as a German theatre in 1804

According to Prussian figures compiled in 1794, there were 4,738 people living within the city walls, as well as another 2,355 in the formerly independent Jewish quarter. There were also 640 in the St. Wojciech settlement, 2,344 in St. Martin's, 329 in Śródka, 255 in Ostrówek (the western part of Śródka, with separate town rights), 1,052 in Chwaliszewo, 126 in Piotrowo, 304 on Ostrów Tumski, and 425 in the abbeys. Taking account of other settlements not listed, this puts the total population of the conurbation at around 15,000. It is estimated that about 70% of the population was Polish, 20% Jewish, and about 10% German (particularly settlers living in the suburbs).

Poznań became part of the province of South Prussia (serving as the provincial capital until 1795, when Warsaw was added in the Third Partition). The Prussian authorities aimed to integrate the conurbation into a single unit. In 1796 the settlements belonging to the Church (which resisted integration) were confiscated, and in 1797 the settlements of St. Wojciech (north of the walled city) and St. Martin (to the west) were incorporated into the city. These were followed in 1800 by the island settlements of Chwaliszewo and Zagórze (on Ostrów Tumski), and Śródka, Ostrówek and Zawady on the right bank.

Coat of arms of Ostrów Tumski

By this time the city covered 7.8 km^{2} (3.0 sq mi) and had a population of close to 19,000, as well as a garrison of 2,500. The old city walls were now redundant militarily and came to be taken down and the moats filled in, enabling new building as the city expanded. Major new streets and squares included the grand avenue of Wilhelms Strasse (today's Aleje Marcinkowskiego) to the west of the old town, Wilhelms Platz (today's Plac Wolności) adjacent to it, Königs Platz (today's Plac Cyryla Ratajskiego) further to the west, and Gerber Strasse (today's ul. Garbary) east of the old town. A fire of 1803 caused significant damage in the old town, and led to wider streets being marked out. In 1804 a theatre (the Arkadia building) was erected on Wilhelms Platz, serving mainly to show German plays. It was designed by architect David Gilly, who also oversaw other development projects in the city.

== In the Duchy of Warsaw (1807–1815) ==
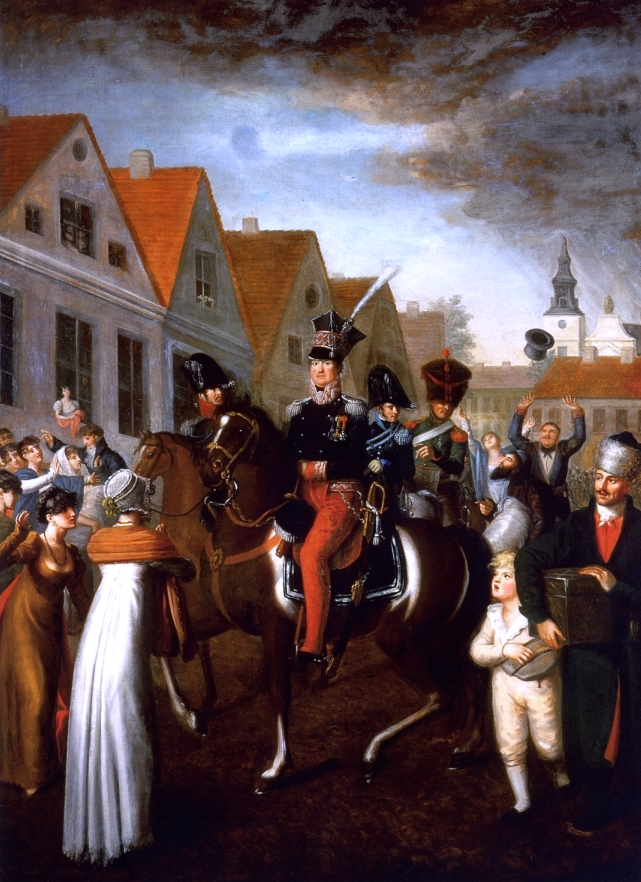
Dąbrowski's Entry into Poznań by Jan Gładysz

Following France's successes against Prussia in the Napoleonic Wars, Napoleon sent Polish generals Jan Henryk Dąbrowski and Józef Wybicki to raise a Polish army to take control of South Prussia, in what was called the Greater Poland Uprising of 1806. On 1–2 November Prussian forces and many officials withdrew from Poznań, leaving Dąbrowski and Wybicki to enter the city on 3 November 1806. The city became a base for continued military action, and Napoleon himself stayed there (at the former Jesuit College) between 27 November and 12 December. In 1806, the Polish 11th Infantry Regiment was formed in Poznań. The following year Poznań became part of the semi-independent Duchy of Warsaw, and served as the capital of an administrative area called Poznań Department.

In 1812 Napoleon's armies again passed through Poznań, this time in retreat following defeat in Russia, and Napoleon stayed in the city (in secret) on 12 December. The last French troops left on 12 February 1813, and Russian troops entered the city the same day, beginning an occupation which lasted until 1815. In that year, as agreed at the Congress of Vienna, Poznań and its region again came under Prussian control.

== In the Prussian Partition for the second time (1815–1918) ==
In 1815 the official population of Poznań was 23,854. The city became the capital of the Grand Duchy of Posen, which in theory enjoyed limited autonomy, with the rights of the Poles respected, although in practice efforts at Germanization were undertaken. Poznań was the seat of the royal governor, Duke Antoni Henryk Radziwiłł. Urban development continued, including the marking out of more streets in the newer "upper town" and its integration with the old town, and demolition of the walls and gates of the old town (several churches were also demolished). Plans were also made for a new line of fortifications around the expanded city, including the Fort Winiary citadel in the north (now the Cytadela park). Construction work on this project began in 1828 and continued for several decades (for details, see Poznań Fortress). Military barracks and training grounds were created in the north of the city.

In 1828, the city was visited by composer Fryderyk Chopin.

Among projects financed by Poles in Poznań, the Raczyński Library, financed by Edward Raczyński, was completed in 1828. German poet Heinrich Heine was most impressed when he visited the site of the library's construction in August 1822, though Edward Raczyński, in fear of rejection, could not disclose to the Prussian authorities he intended to house a Polish public library there until February 1829, when he sent the Prussian king the statute of its foundation and organization and on 24 January 1830 Frederick William III of Prussia did approve it. After the death of the library's founder and then his son, Roger the Prussian authorities made effort to Germanize the Raczyński Library, but these efforts were not fully successful. An important centre of Polish culture in Poznań would be the Bazar hotel on Wilhelms Strasse, built in 1841 by a company set up by Karol Marcinkowski and other Poles. Also in 1841 Marcinkowski and Maciej Mielzynski founded the Towarzystwo Naukowej Pomocy dla Młodzieży Wielkiego Księstwa Poznańskiego ("Scientific Help Society for the Youth of the Grand Duchy of Poznań"), which provided academic scholarships for poor Poles. Raczyński also funded the city's first system of water supply pipes (built of wood, from 1840). Hipolit Cegielski set up his first metal goods shop in the Bazar hotel building in 1846 – the Cegielski company would develop into one of Poznań's largest industrial concerns (since 1919 occupying plants south of Wilda district).

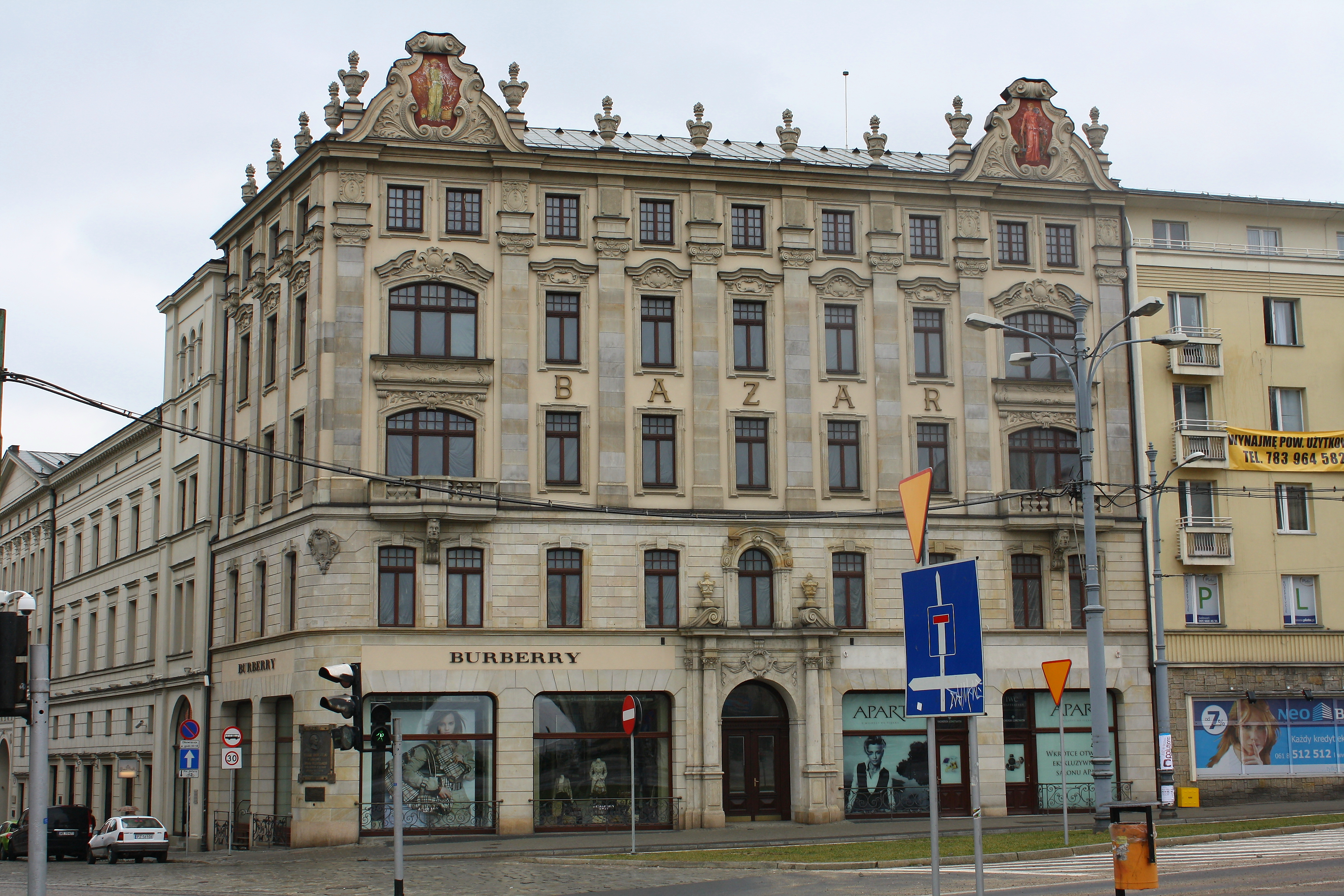
Bazar Hotel, seat of the Polish National Committee in 1848

In the 1830s the idea was raised of building a railway to Frankfurt an der Oder (which was already connected to Berlin). However the Prussian authorities feared that this might be exploited by Russia in case of war; they were also dissatisfied that the project was being promoted by the Polish-dominated provincial parliament. Approval for a railway was finally given in 1846, but running north to Stargard, and the concession was given to a Prussian company. The railway opened on 10 August 1848. The station was in Jeżyce (on the site now occupied by the zoo and the adjacent tram depot). It later gained connections to Breslau (today Wrocław) (1856), Berlin (1870), Inowrocław and Bromberg (today Bydgoszcz) (1872), and Upper Silesia (1875). The station on its present site, south-west of the city centre, was built in 1879. A direct line to Warsaw would not be opened until 1921.

Polish sentiment against the partitioning powers led to two insurrections, each known as a "Greater Poland Uprising" (powstanie wielkopolskie). The 1846 uprising was easily defeated, the insurgents being tried in Berlin the following year. The 1848 uprising initially enjoyed greater success, as it was supported by the German National Assembly which had come into being through the Spring of Nations revolutions, being seen as a force against possible Russian intervention. However this support was lost when the insurrection was seen to be directed against Germans in the region, and this uprising too was ultimately unsuccessful. The Polish National Committee was founded and based in the city. Following these events the Duchy lost its residual autonomy, being "degraded" to the Province of Posen (Provinz Posen), although the Prussian kings continued to use the title Grand Duke of Posen. With Prussia, the province became part of the united German Empire in 1871.

Polish national poet Juliusz Słowacki stayed in Poznań from 11 April to 9 May 1848, when he departed to Wrocław. Słowacki first met Karol Libelt in Poznań. The first obituary of Fryderyk Chopin, by poet Cyprian Norwid, and the composer's first biography, by Marceli Szulc, were published in Poznań in 1849 and 1873, respectively.

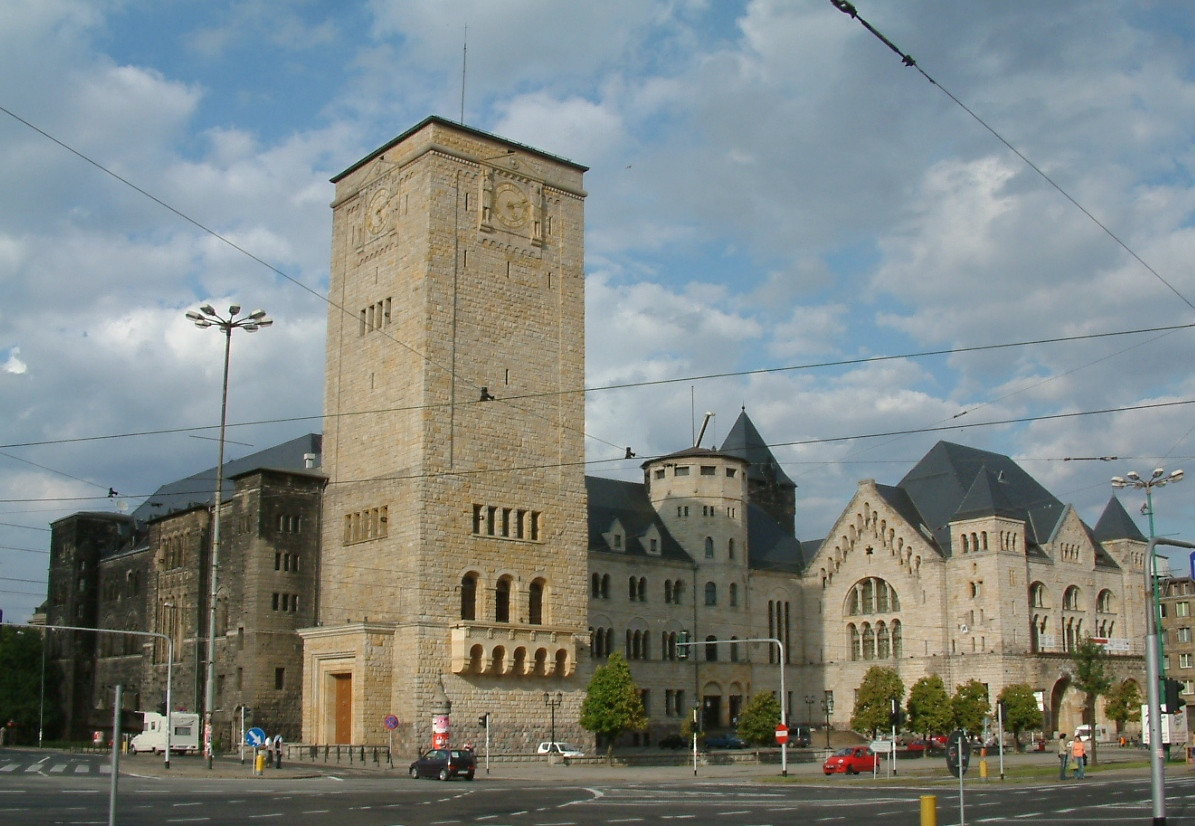
The imperial palace

Polish social and academic organizations continued to be set up, including the Central Economic Society for the Grand Duchy of Poznań (1861) to promote modern agriculture, the Poznań Society of Friends of Learning (1875), and the People's Libraries Society (1880). In 1873–1875 a Polish theatre was built by public subscription (Teatr Polski, still functioning today). The authorities, however, continued efforts to Germanize the region, including through the activities of the Prussian Settlement Commission, founded in 1886. Germans accounted for 38% of the city's population (20,000 out of 53,000) in 1867 – by 1910 their number would rise to 50,000, though this represented a smaller percentage of the total population of the city (whose boundaries had significantly expanded in the meantime). As the population increased the proportion of Jews in the city also fell: from 20.5% in 1831 to 13.3% in 1867 and 3.6% in 1910 (a total of about 5,000).

A gasworks was built on Grobla in 1853–1856, enabling the first gas streetlights to be installed in 1858 (this form of lighting would continue in use until the early 1960s). Grobla was also the site of the city's first modern waterworks (1866) and major electricity works (1904). Sewers began to be installed on a large scale at the end of the 19th century.

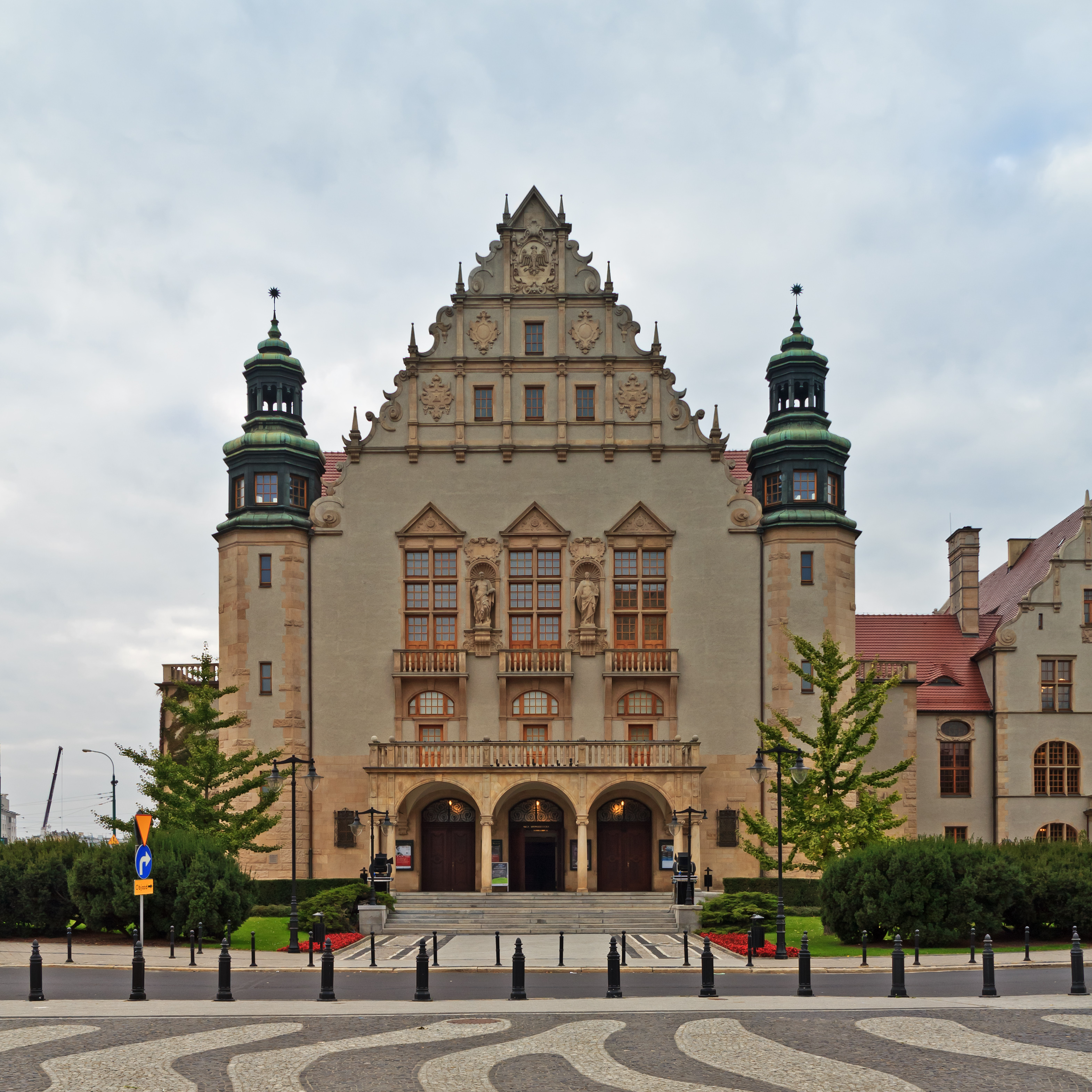
Collegium Minus, originally the Prussian Royal Academy building

To strengthen the city's defences, in the second stage of the Festung Posen scheme, an outer ring of forts was built to encircle the city. The nine original forts were built starting in 1876, and nine intermediate forts were built between them from 1887. Poznań was by now a major military post, headquarters of the German Fifth Army Corps. However much of the original inner ring of fortifications was now redundant and could be taken down, enabling the city to expand more freely, particularly to the west. Near the old Berlin Gate a series of imposing buildings was constructed, including the neo-Romanesque imperial palace (now called Zamek), completed in 1910, which lent the city the status of a royal residence. The other buildings included the opera house, a post office headquarters (Oberpostdirektion), the railway board headquarters, a Royal Academy, and the headquarters of the Settlement Commission, where teachers and clerics were trained. (The last two are now university buildings: Collegium Minus of Adam Mickiewicz University, and Collegium Maius, occupied mainly by Poznań Medical University.)

Serious floods (reaching the Old Market) occurred in 1855, 1888 and 1889. In 1889 Emperor Wilhelm II visited the city to inspect the flood damage, and appointed a committee to take steps to prevent further such disasters. The small river branch called the Zgniła Warta ("rotten Warta") flowing west of Grobla (on the line of today's ul. Mostowa) was filled in, as was a stream following into it (today's ul. Łąkowa). It was also planned to divert the main stream of the Warta to flow east of Chwaliszewo (in what was then a flood relief channel), but this plan would not be realized until 1968 (further major floods would occur in 1924 and 1940).

Poznań gained its first electric trams in 1898 (horse-drawn trams had operated since 1880, running from the new rail station to the Old Market Square, and later to the cathedral; see Tramways in Poznań). The first motor cars were seen on the city's streets in 1901, and the first taxis in 1905.

In 1902 Wilhelm II visited the city to give speeches and unveil a statue of Frederick. Poles protested his visit by leaving the city or shuttering homes. The Polish management of Wilhelm's hotel even left the building undecorated. While the ethnic Germans received Wilhelm with praise, only one hereditary Polish noble met the emperor. It was during this visit that Wilhelm called for the expansion of the city and the removal of some military fortifications. Wilhelm also gave a speech to attempt alleviate the ethnic conflicts in the region, but observers noted that the populace was unconvinced.

In 1896 the right-bank suburbs of Piotrowo and Berdychowo became part of the city. The city borders were then expanded significantly westwards in 1900, to include the former villages of Łazarz, Górczyn, Jeżyce and Wilda. Sołacz was added in 1907. Poznań now covered an area of 33.9 km^{2} (13.1 sq mi). In 1911–1913 the St. Roch road bridge was built across the Warta close to Berdychowo (a bridge had previously stood there until 1771).

Linguistic structure of population of the city of Poznań in 1846-1931
Year	Total population	German-speakers		Polish-speakers (including bilinguals)		Others	
Year	Total population	Number	Percent	Number	Percent	Number	Percent
1846	38,027	8,894	23.4%	29,133	76.6%	0	0.0%
1852	38,209	10,800	28.3%	27,409	71.7%	0	0.0%
1855	40,926	12,016	29.4%	28,910	70.6%	0	0.0%
1858	41,253	12,428	30.1%	28,825	69.9%	0	0.0%
1890	69,627	34,400	49.4%	35,093	50.4%	134	0.2%
1900	117,033	51,006	43.6%	65,772	56.2%	255	0.2%
1905	136,808	57,943	42.3%	78,673	57.5%	192	0.2%
1910	156,691	65,319	41.7%	90,684	57.9%	688	0.4%
1921	169,793	11,207	6.6%	157,589	92.8%	997	0.6%
1931	246,470	6,387	2.6%	238,167	96.6%	1,916	0.8%

Linguistic structure of elementary school pupils in the city of Poznań in 1886-1911
Year	Total number of pupils	German-speaking pupils		Polish-speaking pupils (including bilinguals)	
Year	Total number of pupils	Number	Percent	Number	Percent
1886	6,350	2,257	35.5%	4,048	63.7%
1891	5,725	1,647	28.8%	4,078	71.2%
1896	5,919	1,428	24.1%	4,490	75.9%
1901	11,543	2,867	24.8%	8,676	75.2%
1906	14,183	3,240	22.8%	10,941	77.1%
1911	17,127	3,651	21.3%	13,471	78.7%

== Interwar period ==
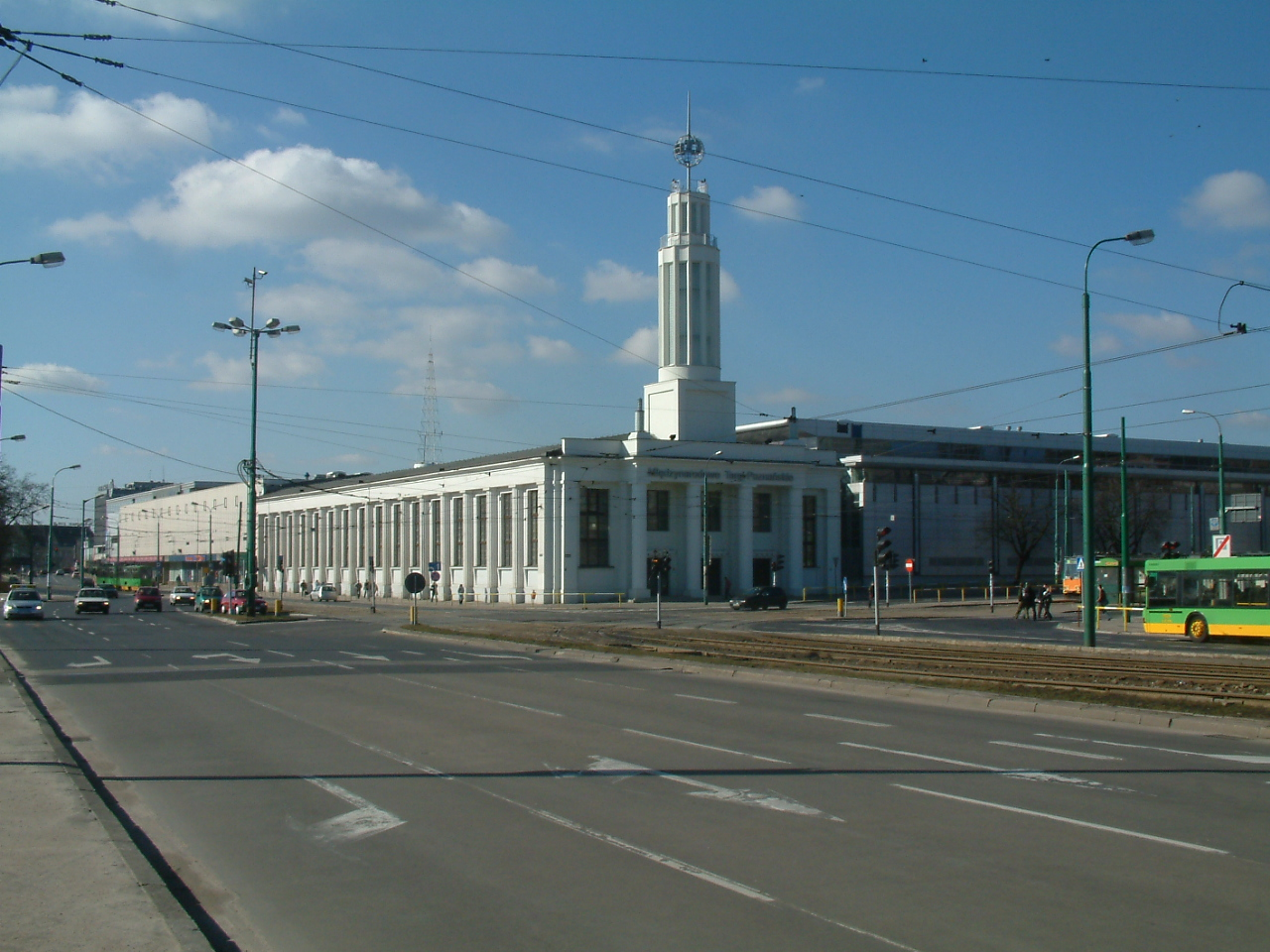
The trade fair site

Following Germany's defeat in World War I Polish independence seemed assured, but it was not clear whether Greater Poland would become part of the new state of Poland. A speech given in Poznań by Ignacy Paderewski on December 27, 1918 ignited the Greater Poland Uprising of 1918–1919, in which Polish troops attempted to take control of the region from Germany. The uprising was largely successful, and in the Versailles peace treaty (signed June 28, 1919) most of the region was granted to Poland, with Poznań as the capital of the newly formed Poznań Voivodeship within the Second Polish Republic. Many German inhabitants left to live within the new German borders, partly because of discrimination. Germans made up 5.5% of the city's population in 1921, and 2.6% in 1931 (after the expansion of the city's boundaries).

In 1919 Poznań University was opened, taking over the buildings of the Prussian Settlement Commission and Royal Academy. In 1921 Poznań first hosted trade fairs, which from 1925 became the Poznań International Fairs. From 16 May to 30 September 1929 the fairs site became the venue for a major National Exhibition (Powszechna Wystawa Krajowa, popularly PeWuKa), held to mark ten years of Polish independence. The exhibition attracted around 4.5 million visitors. The Pan-Slavic Congress of Singers was held as part of the exhibition's opening days.

In the interwar period the city's borders were expanded to include Główna, Komandoria, Rataje, Starołęka, Dębiec, Szeląg and Winogrady (including the Citadel) in 1925, and Golęcin and Podolany in 1933. The city's area was now 76.9 square kilometres (29.7 sq mi).

== World War II ==
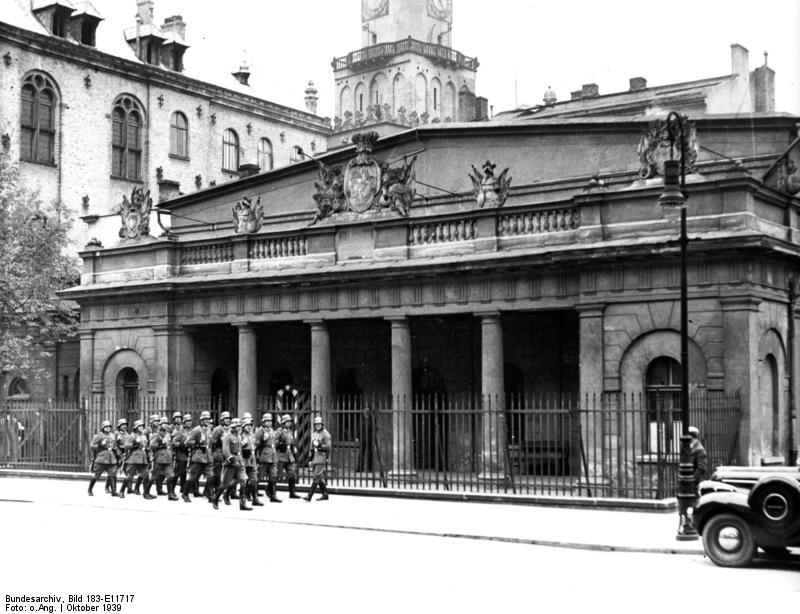
German soldiers in Poznań (1939)

Poznań was invaded by German troops on 10 September 1939, during the invasion of Poland, which started World War II. On 12 September, the Einsatzkommando 1 and Einsatzgruppe VI paramilitary death squads entered the city to commit various crimes against the population. Already in September, the occupiers carried out mass arrests and first massacres of local Poles, including at nearby Zdziechowa. The Germans also carried out mass searches of Polish institutions and libraries, and closed down Polish organizations, press and cultural institutions. Poznań was made the headquarters of the central district of the Selbstschutz, which task was to commit atrocities against Poles during the German invasion of Poland. On 8 October 1939, Poznań was annexed by Germany, and was included into a newly formed province called initially Reichsgau Posen, and later Reichsgau Wartheland (Warthe being the German name for the Warta river). The governor (Gauleiter) was Arthur Greiser, who would be hanged for crimes against humanity after the war. Ernst Damzog was appointed the police inspector for both Sicherheitspolizei and Sicherheitsdienst in German-occupied Poznań.

During the German occupation, many people were murdered, executed, tortured or detained in inhumane conditions, particularly at the notorious Fort VII concentration camp, set up in one of the late 19th-century defensive forts, and later at the camp in Żabikowo. In October 1939, the German police and Selbstschutz also carried out mass arrests of local priests (see Nazi persecution of the Catholic Church in Poland). Over 3,400 Polish prisoners of Fort VII, including college students, women and nuns, were massacred in nearby Dopiewiec and Dębienko. Several local Polish school principals and teachers were also murdered in the Mauthausen concentration camp. Mentally ill patients from the local municipal hospital were gassed in Fort VII, as part of Aktion T4.

Some 100,000 inhabitants were expelled to the General Government in the more-eastern part of German-occupied Poland. The aim of German policy was gradual extermination of Polish and Jewish population in the region, with the victims of German campaign estimated at 460,000. Many others were sent to Germany as forced labour or conscripted into the German army. Poznań was the seat the German Central Bureau for Resettlement (UWZ, Umwandererzentralstelle), a special German institution established in November 1939 to coordinate the expulsion of Poles from occupied Polish territories. Poznań's Jewish population, which had numbered 2,000 in 1939, was largely murdered in the Holocaust. Property belonging to expelled or murdered Poles and Jews was often given to Volksdeutsche resettled from Baltic States, Eastern Europe and central Germany. Figures for 1944 show 94,000 Germans living in Poznań.

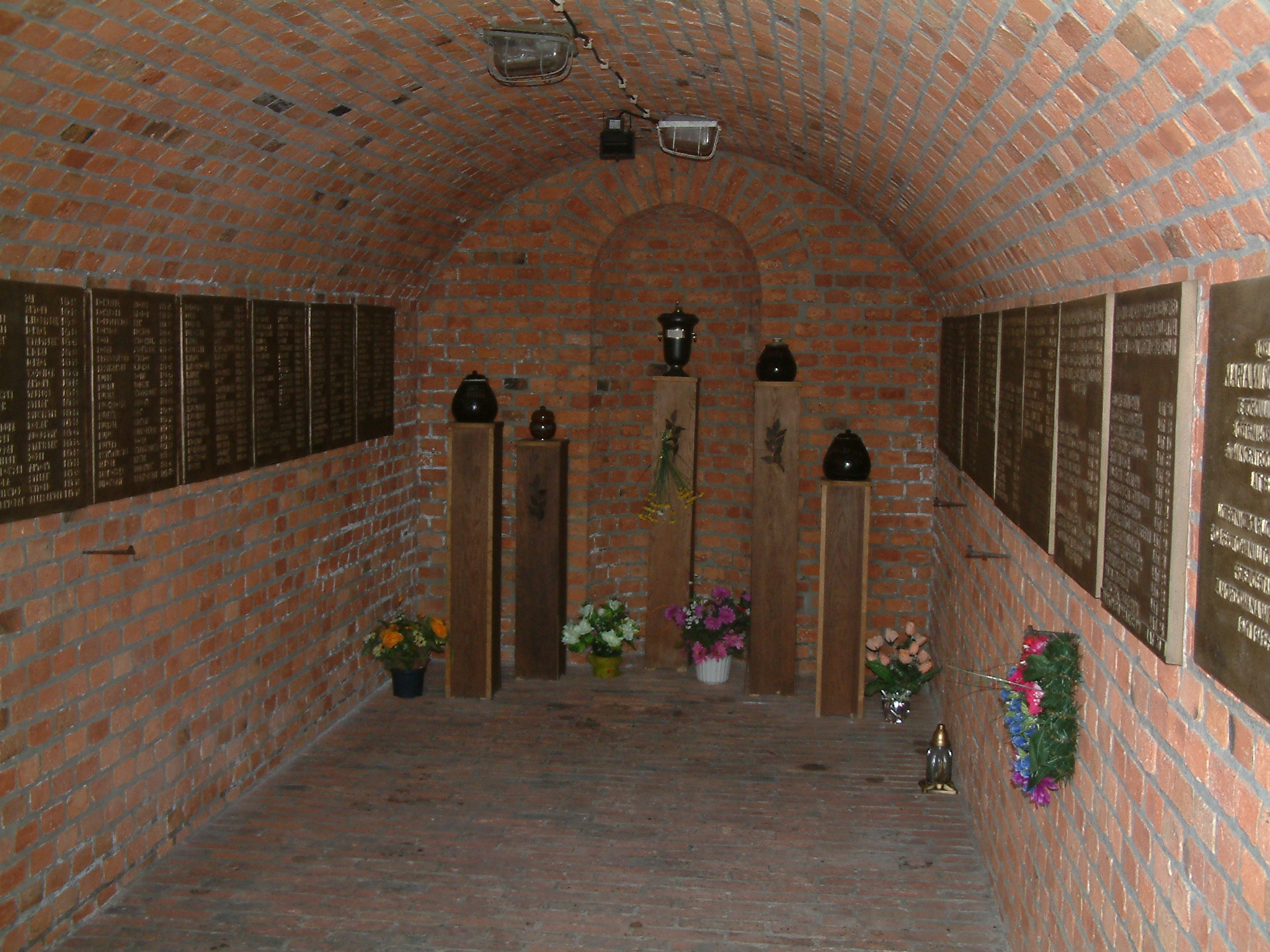
Bunker no. 16 in Fort VII, used by the German occupiers as an improvised gas chamber

Poles were subjected to forced labour also in the city itself, and from 1941, the German labor office in Poznań demanded that Polish children as young as 12 register for work, but it is known that even ten-year-old children were forced to work. In 1943, the Germans also carried out deportations of kidnapped Polish children from Poznań to a camp for Polish children in Łódź, which was nicknamed "little Auschwitz" due to its terrible conditions.

From 1940 to 1945, the German Nazi government operated the Stalag XXI-D prisoner-of-war camp for Allied POWs in Poznań.

The Polish resistance movement was active in the city. Several organizations were formed in Poznań, including Tajna Polska Organizacja Wojskowa (Secret Polish Military Organization), Poznańska Organizacja Zbrojna (Poznań Military Organization), Narodowa Organizacja Bojowa (National Fighting Organization), Ojczyzna (Homeland) and Komitet Niesienia Pomocy (Relief Committee), with some later merged into larger structures. Regional branches of the nationwide Union of Armed Struggle, Bataliony Chłopskie, Gray Ranks and Polska Niepodległa organizations were also founded. Activities included secret Polish schooling, printing and distribution of underground Polish press, sabotage actions, military trainings, espionage of German activity, providing aid to people in need, preparations for a planned uprising, and facilitating escapes of British prisoners of war from Stalag XXI-D. In June 1940, the Bureau of the Government Delegation for Poland for Polish territories annexed by Germany was founded, and in July 1940, even an underground Polish parliament was established in Poznań. The Germans cracked down on Polish resistance several times, with many Poles either executed or tortured and killed in prisons and concentration camps. In February 1943, a flying unit of the Union of Armed Struggle and Home Army carried out an operation to burn down Wehrmacht warehouses in the local river port, an action deemed one of the most spectacular in the region.

The Nazi authorities made further significant expansions to the city boundaries in 1940–42, incorporating most of the territory of today's city, thus almost tripling its size to 226 km^{2} (87 sq mi). They also replaced Polish names for districts with German ones (sometimes newly invented). The Polish names were restored after the war, but the expanded city boundaries were retained.

As the Soviet Red Army advanced into Poland in January 1945, Poznań was declared a Festung, meaning that it was to be defended at all costs. Greiser himself fled, but evacuation of civilians was forbidden until January 20. Soviet forces reached the city on January 25 and, following nine days of artillery bombardment, began their ground assault on February 18, aided by some Polish civilians and a unit of the 2nd Polish Army. On the night of February 22, the German commander, Ernst Gomell, committed suicide, and the following morning the remaining garrison surrendered. The struggle left over 55% of the city destroyed, including over 90% of the Old Town. For more details, see Battle of Poznań (1945).

== Since 1945 ==
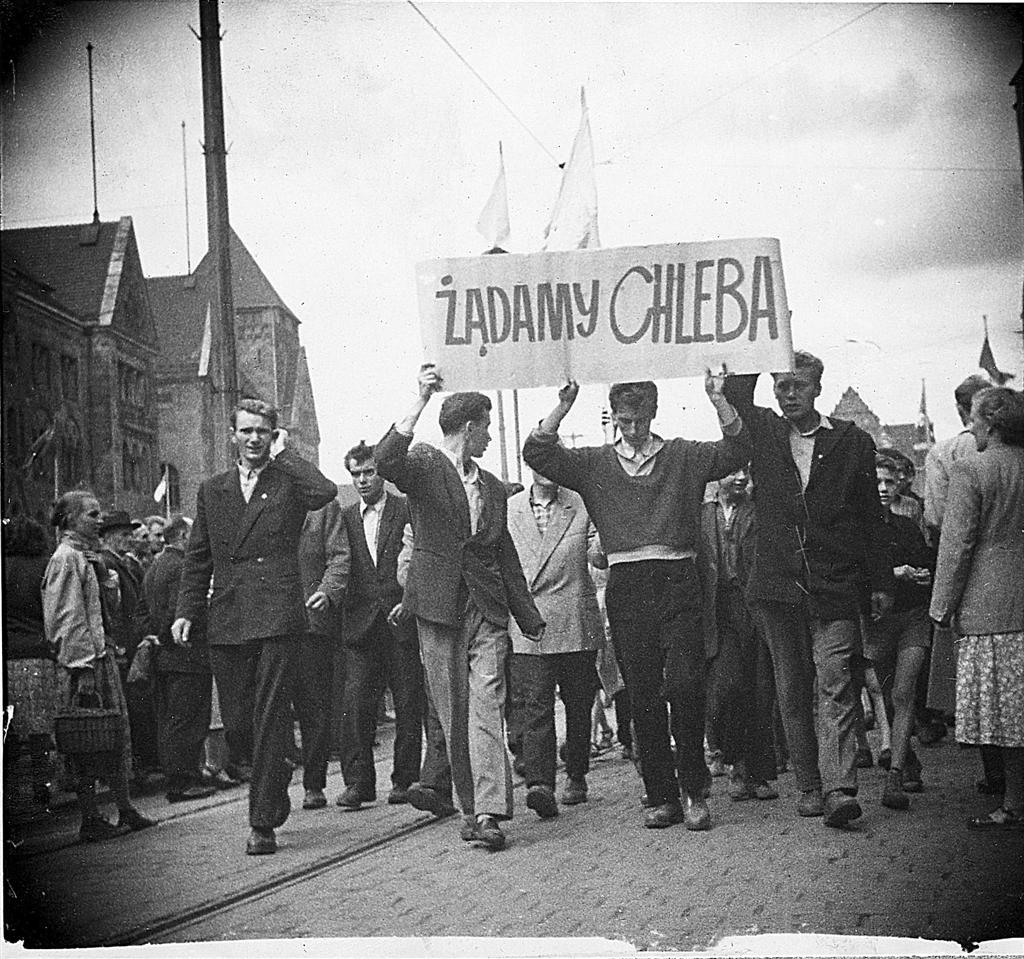
"We demand bread" – a march during the 1956 protests

Many Germans had fled the region as the Soviets advanced; the post-war expulsions of Germans from Polish territory in accordance with the Potsdam Agreement (and emigration of remaining Jews) left Poznań with an almost uniformly ethnically Polish population, which totalled 268,000 in 1946. During the early post-war years much of the city was rebuilt from ruins. The city again became the capital of Poznań Voivodeship, now within the communist People's Republic of Poland. In 1950 the size of the voivodeship was reduced, and the city of Poznań itself was given separate voivodeship status.

In 1949, the 1572 Posnania asteroid was discovered at the Poznań Observatory, and later named after the city.

In June 1956, workers at the city's Cegielski locomotive factory, the largest factory in Poland, demanded talks with Prime Minister Józef Cyrankiewicz to protest at low wages, lack of overtime pay, tax changes and food shortages. The government refused to talk, and after a series of strikes, on June 28 a workers' protest march was fired on by the authorities. The situation escalated; crowds ransacked the communist party headquarters and attacked the secret police headquarters, where they were repulsed by police fire. According to official figures, 67 people were killed; hundreds more were injured or arrested. The riots continued for two days until being quelled by the army. These protests are seen as an early expression of resistance to communist rule in Poland. For more details, see Poznań 1956 protests.

From the 1960s onwards intensive housing development took place, consisting mainly of pre-fabricated concrete blocks of flats. The largest areas of such development were Rataje and Winogrady. Later Piątkowo, which came within the city boundaries in 1974, would be used for similar large-scale building.

A major infrastructural change in the city centre, completed in the late 1960s, was the rerouting of the river Warta so that its main stream flowed in the former relief channel east of Chwaliszewo (as had been planned following the floods of 1889); a right branch was also created linking with the Cybina across the former Berdychowo dam (Tama Berdychowska), thus making Ostrów Tumski a true island between the two branches. The former main stream west of Chwaliszewo was filled in and the land reclaimed, and a new main road was built crossing the island, with bridges across both river branches, leading to Śródka (where significant demolition took place south of the main square).

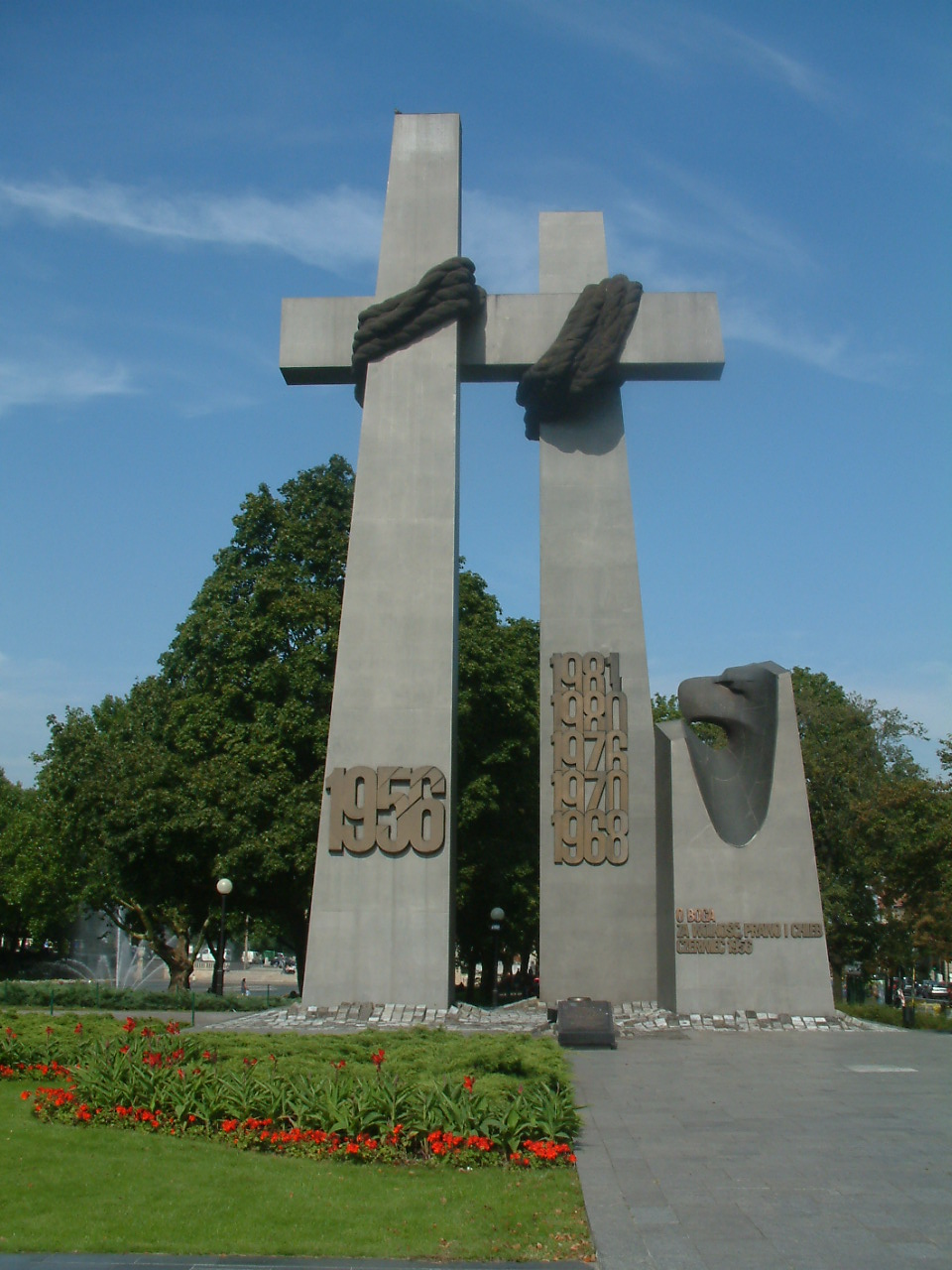
The June 1956 monument

In the administrative reforms of 1975, Poznań ceased to be a city with separate voivodeship status, and became the capital of a much smaller Poznań Voivodeship.

Following the early successes of the Solidarity movement, in 1981 a monument to the events and victims of June 1956 was erected on Adam Mickiewicz Square, with Lech Wałęsa attending. In 1983 Pope John Paul II visited Poznań.

In 1987 the most recent expansion of the city's boundaries took place, with the addition of new areas mainly to the north, including Morasko, Radojewo and Kiekrz.

Following the fall of communism, the first free local government elections took place in 1990. A second papal visit took place in 1997. In 1998 a Weimar triangle meeting took place in Poznań between German chancellor Helmut Kohl, French president Jacques Chirac and Polish president Aleksander Kwaśniewski.

In 1997 transport communication between the northern estates of Winogrady and Piątkowo and the city centre was greatly improved with the opening of the Poznań fast tram route (Poznański Szybki Tramwaj, popularly Pestka). Poznań gained its first motorway connection in 2003 (part of the A2 autostrada running south of the city in the directions of Warsaw and Berlin).

With the Polish local government reforms of 1999, Poznań again became the capital of a larger voivodeship, now called Greater Poland Voivodeship. It also became the seat of a powiat ("Poznań County"), although the city itself acquired separate powiat status.

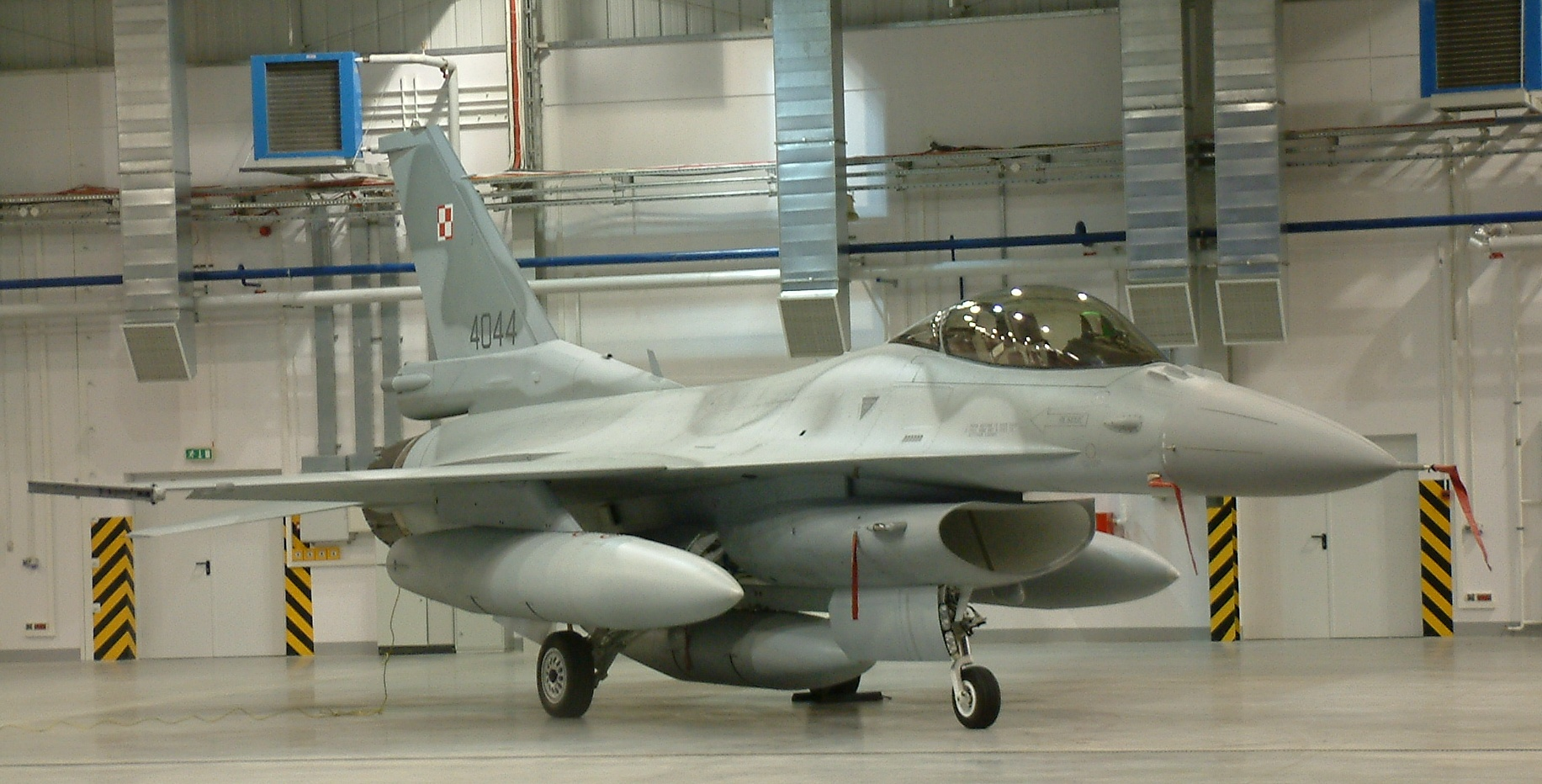
One of the first F-16 fighters stationed at Krzesiny

In 2006 Poland's first F-16 Fighting Falcons arrived in Poznań. They are stationed at the 31st Air Base in Krzesiny in the south-east of the city.

Poznań continues to host regular trade fairs and international events, usually at the Poznań International Fair site. In December 2008 it hosted the United Nations Climate Change Conference. Poznań was also one of the host cities for the EuroBasket 2009 and 2012 European Football Championship.

In 2015, a medieval treasure, including 350 coins and 8,000 fragments of clay vessels, was discovered during archaeological excavations in the Old Town.

== See also ==
- History of Poland
- Historical population of Poznań
- Polish text of Poznań's founding charter
- Timeline of Poznań history
- Museum of the History of Poznań
