= Jerzy Pertek =

Polish journalist

Jerzy Pertek (1920-1989) was a Polish journalist and writer specializing in maritime topics, particularly the history of the Polish Navy in the interwar period and World War II. He authored about 60 books and close to 2000 articles.

After his death, his collection of books and other publications related to the maritime history was taken over by the Raczyński Library, and a small museum Memory Room of Jerzy Pertek was created in his former house.
