= Rogalin Landscape Park =

Landscape park in Greater Poland Voivodeship, Poland

- Rogaliński Park Krajobrazowy
- IUCN category V (protected landscape/seascape)
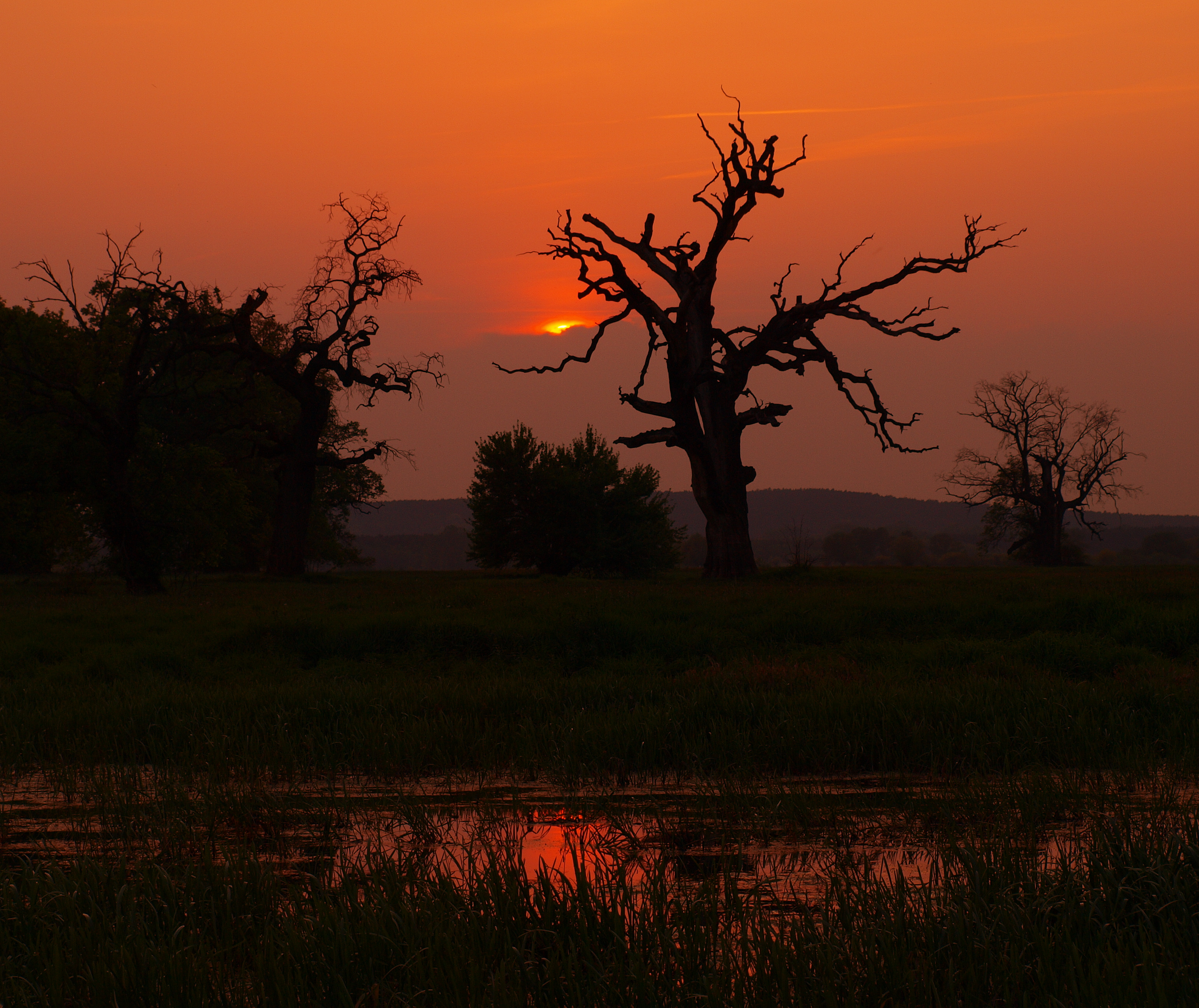
- Interactive map of Rogalin Landscape Park
- Location: Greater Poland Voivodeship
- Coordinates: 52°14′N 16°56′E
- Area: 126.4 km^{2} (48.8 sq mi)

Rogalin Landscape Park (Polish: Rogaliński Park Krajobrazowy) is a protected area (Landscape Park) in west-central Poland, covering an area of 126.4 square kilometres (48.8 sq mi). It includes two nature reserves.

== Overview ==
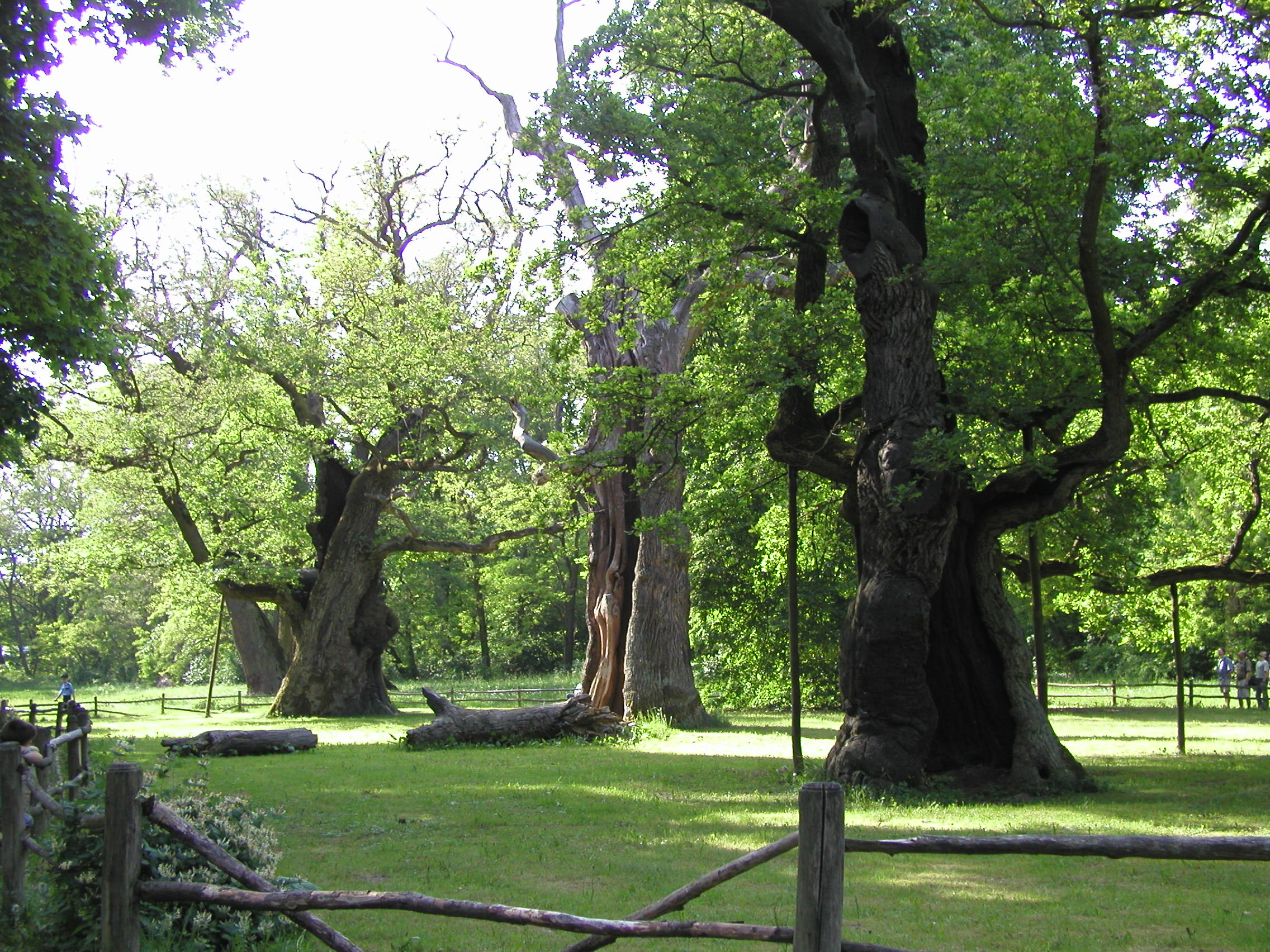
Ancient oaks in Rogalin

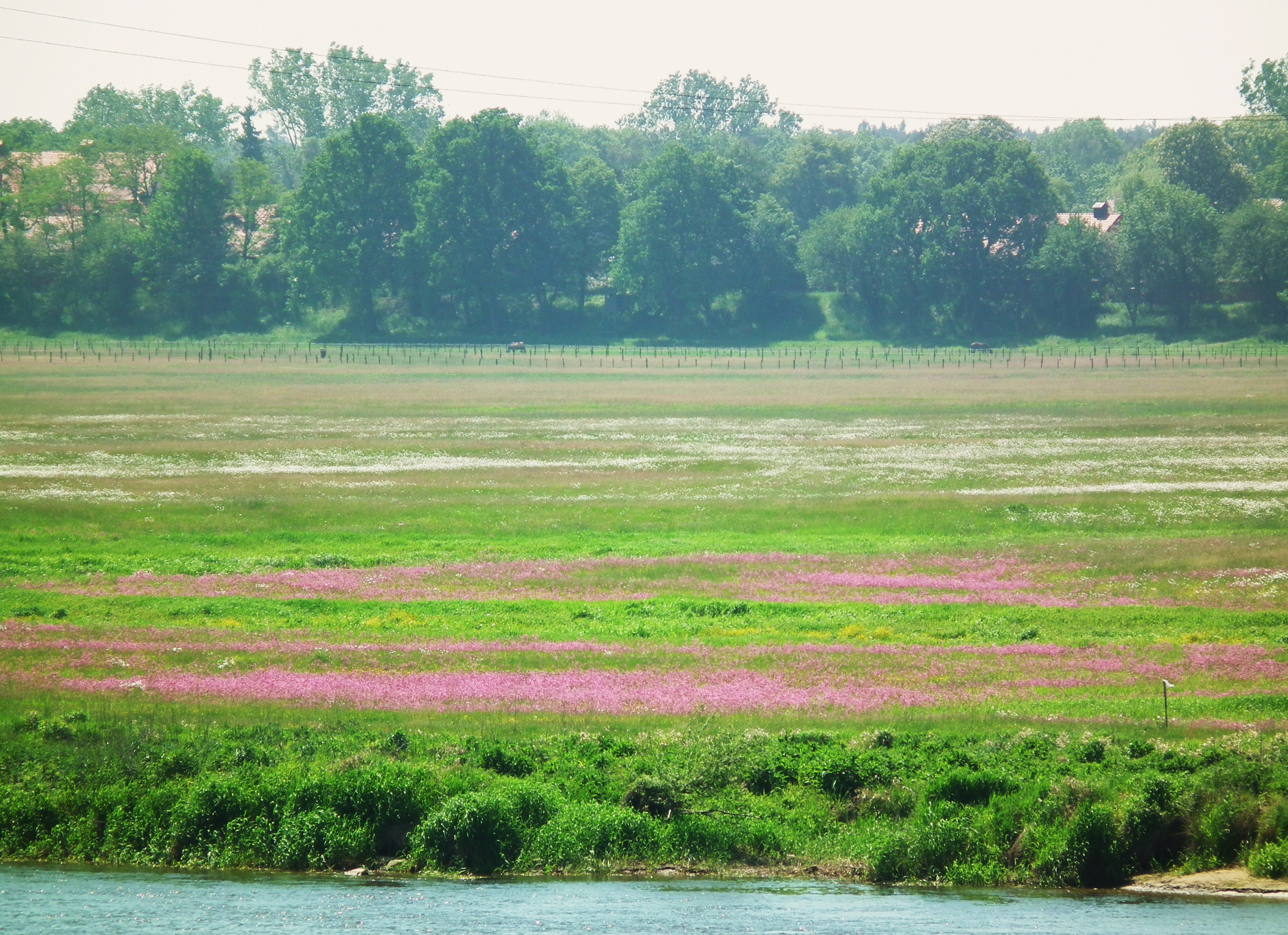
Meadows in Rogalinek

The Park lies within Greater Poland Voivodeship, across the Poznań County and the Śrem County. It stretches along the banks of the Warta river, and takes its name from the village of Rogalin, which is famous for its historic palace of the Raczynski family and oak trees.

About 2000 magnificent oaks are found on the floodplain of the river Warta near Rogalin, among numerous oxbow lakes, but also among fields and neighbouring forests. It is Europe's largest group of monumental oak trees, located within the Rogalin Landscape Park. Their trunks reach a circumference of up to 9 metres, and all those reaching over 3 m in circumference are protected by law.

== History ==
Traces of human settlement in the area of the Park date back to the 9th century BC, there are numerous archaeological sites from the turn of the Antiquity and the Middle Ages, connected with the ford across the Warta River and the Warta swamps. The present-day villages were founded during the full Middle Ages, but they did not retain their original urban layout. In the mid-17th century, after the period of destruction caused by wars and natural disasters, a period of settlement of emigrants from Germany and the Netherlands began, establishing new settlements in previously unoccupied, marshy or wooded places.

The rapid decline in forest cover in the region occurred as a result of settlement in the years 1400–1523 – when the forest area decreased by approx. 30% – and was deepened in the years 1600–1800 by another 20%. At the end of the 18th century, the Prussian administration introduced planned forest management and artificial renewal of cut forests, and in the Second Polish Republic, the principles of forest management developed in Greater Poland during the partitions were adopted.

In the 18th century, extensive drainage works were carried out in the area of the Park, creating a system of canals and regulated watercourses with water objects, draining the sparse wetlands. In the nineteenth century, the Prussian government carried out regulatory works on the Warta River, significantly shortening its course from Śrem to Poznań by building ditches eliminating meanders, narrowing and deepening the fairway. Frequent floods and the changing course of the river current prevented intensive farming in the wide Warta valley, which contributed to the preservation of its natural landscape.
