= Raczynski =

Surname

Raczyński or Raczynski is a surname. Notable people with the surname include:

- Aleksander Raczyński (1822–1889), Polish portrait painter
- Atanazy Raczyński (1788–1874), Polish count
- Bogdan Raczynski (born 1977), Canada-based braindance artist
- Dariusz Raczyński, (1962–2022), Polish footballer
- Edward Aleksander Raczyński (1847–1926), Polish nobleman, patron of arts
- Edward Bernard Raczyński (1891–1993), Polish aristocrat, diplomat, writer, politician and President of Poland in exile (1979–1986)
- Edward Raczyński (1786–1845) (1786–1845), Polish conservative politician, protector of arts, founder of the Raczyński Library in Poznań
- Ignacy Raczyński (1741–1823), primate of Poland
- Jan Raczynski (born 1958), Russian human rights activist
- Kristoff Raczyñski (born 1974), Mexican actor
- Ludwik Raczyński (born 1943), Polish sailor
- Nicole Raczynski (born 1980), American professional wrestler
- Ugo Raczynski (born 1977), French football manager
- Zdzisław Raczyński (born 1959), Polish diplomat, novelist and journalist

== See also ==
- Raczyński Library in Poznań, founded by Edward Raczyński (1786–1845), in Poznań
