= Lake Malta =

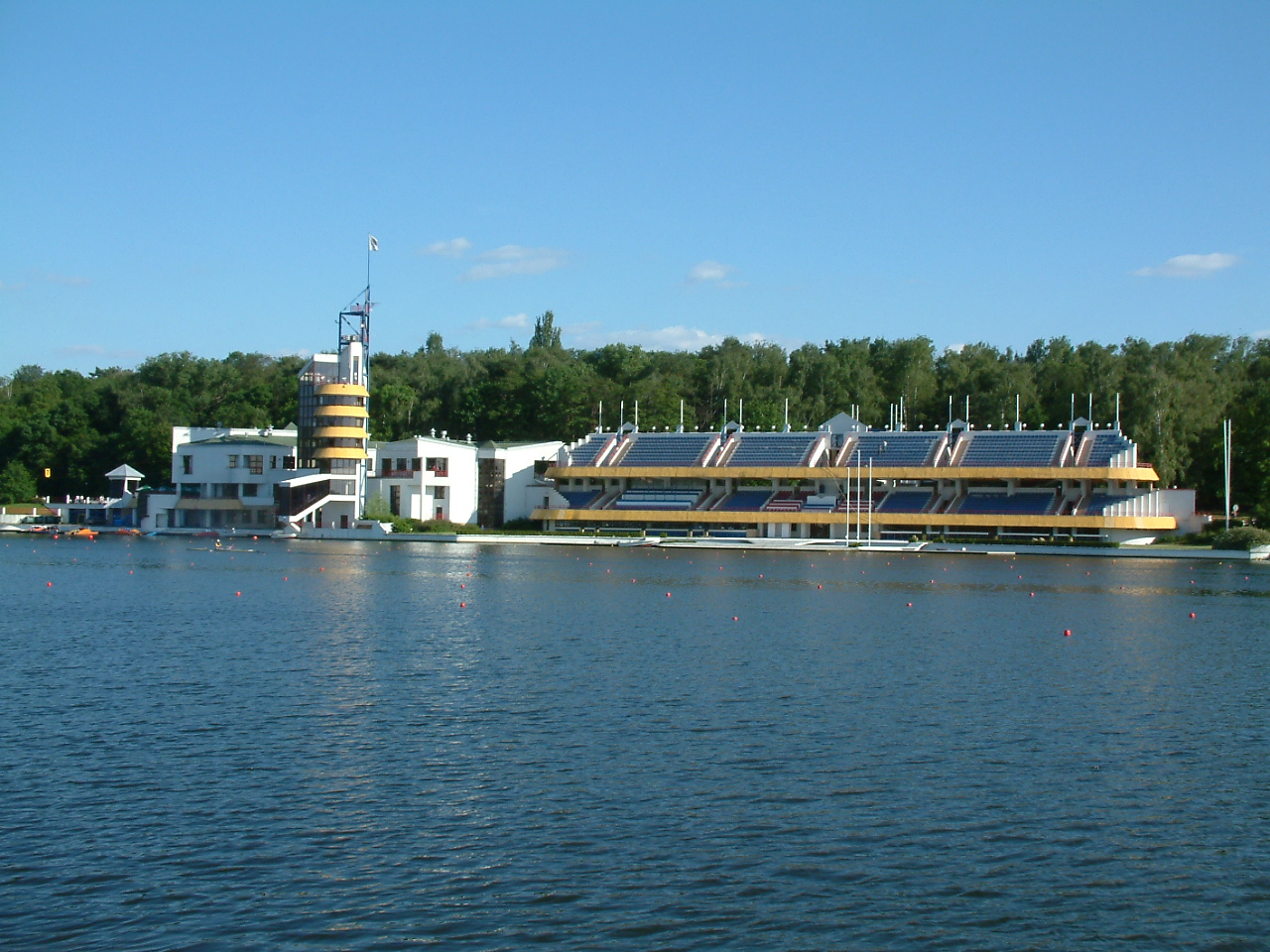
- Lake during training of Chinese team before Rowing World Cup in 2006

- Location within Greater Poland Voivodeship
- Location: Poznań
- Coordinates: 52°24′9″N 16°58′15″E
- Type: artificial lake
- Primary inflows: Cybina
- Primary outflows: Cybina
- Basin countries: Poland
- Max. length: 2.2 km (1.4 mi)
- Max. width: 0.46 km (0.29 mi)
- Surface area: 0.64 km^{2} (0.25 sq mi)
- Average depth: 3.1 m (10 ft)
- Max. depth: 5 m (16 ft)

Lake Malta, known also as the Maltański Reservoir, is an artificial lake in Poznań, Poland. It was formed in 1952 as a result of the damming of the Cybina River. It is about 2.2 km long (with the circuit of 5,6 km), which makes the lake the biggest man-made lake of the city. The water is 3.1 m deep on average with a maximum about 5 m. There are a number of recreational attractions along the edge of the lake including:

- an artificial ski slope,
- an artificial ice rink,
- a zoological garden,
- Kolejka Parkowa Maltanka - a narrow gauge railway,
- the Mound of Freedom,
- seasonal bikes rental - MaltaBike

The lake also has one of the oldest man-made rowing venues in Europe - The Malta Regatta Course. This dates back to 1952 and has held a number of Rowing World Cup events. It also hosted the ICF Canoe Sprint World Championships in 1990 and 2001, and did so again in 2010.

The lake also gives its name to the Malta theatre festival, held in Poznań annually in June, with some of the shows taking place next to the lake.

The name of the lake comes from the Knights Hospitaller also known as Knights of Malta. The lake was built on land owned by Church of St. John of Jerusalem Outside the Walls, given to the order in 1187 by duke Mieszko III the Old.

Because of the importance of the lake for the city of Poznań, various methods to improve its water quality have been investigated.

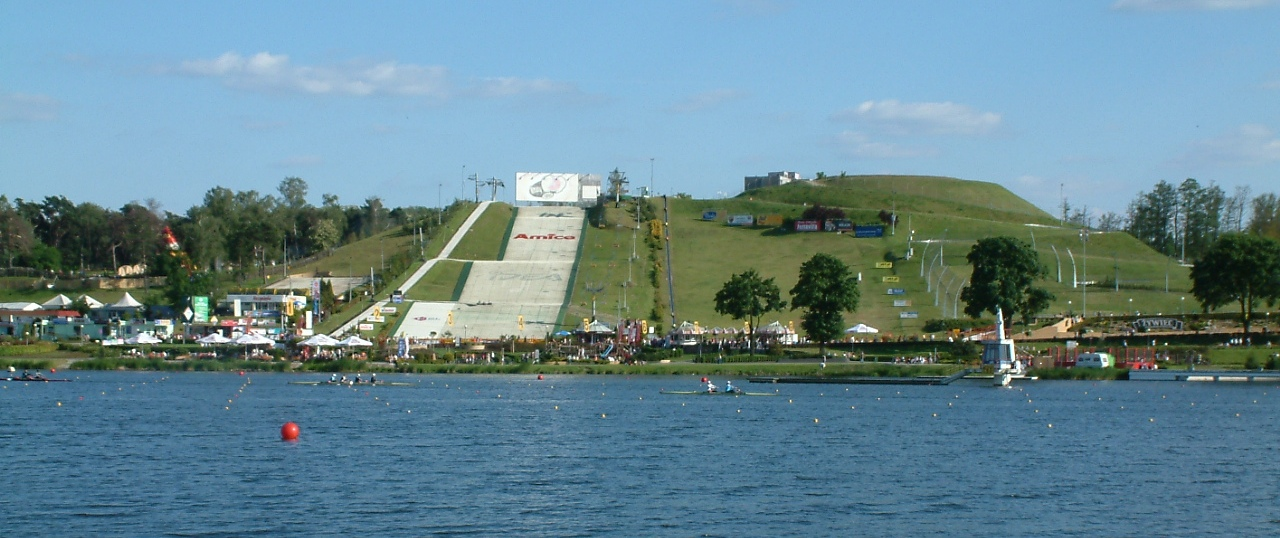
The Mound of Freedom and artificial ski slope "Malta-ski"

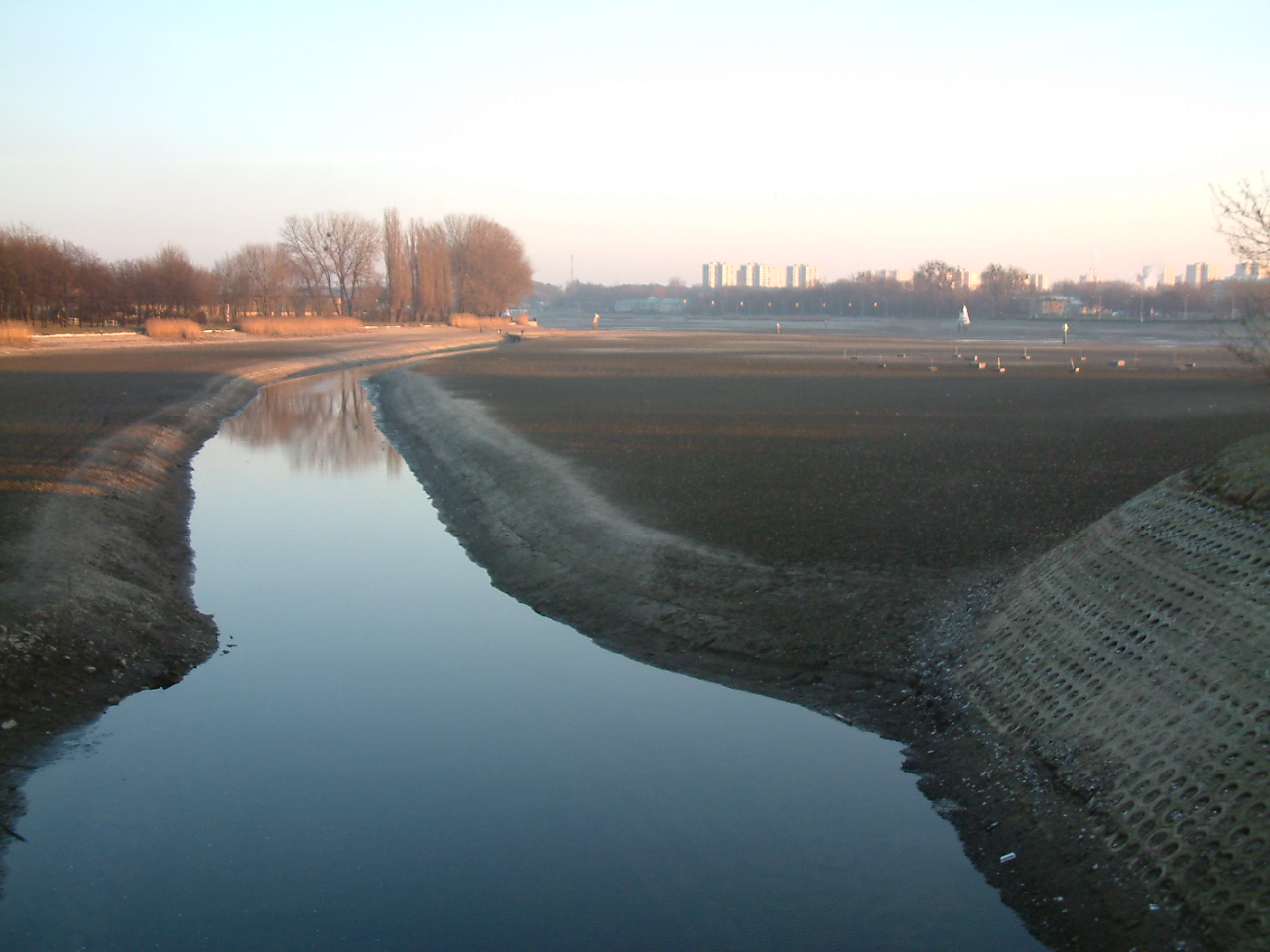
The bottom of the lake during winter 2004/2005. The Cybina river is visible.
