= Demographics of Poznań =

Polish city's population

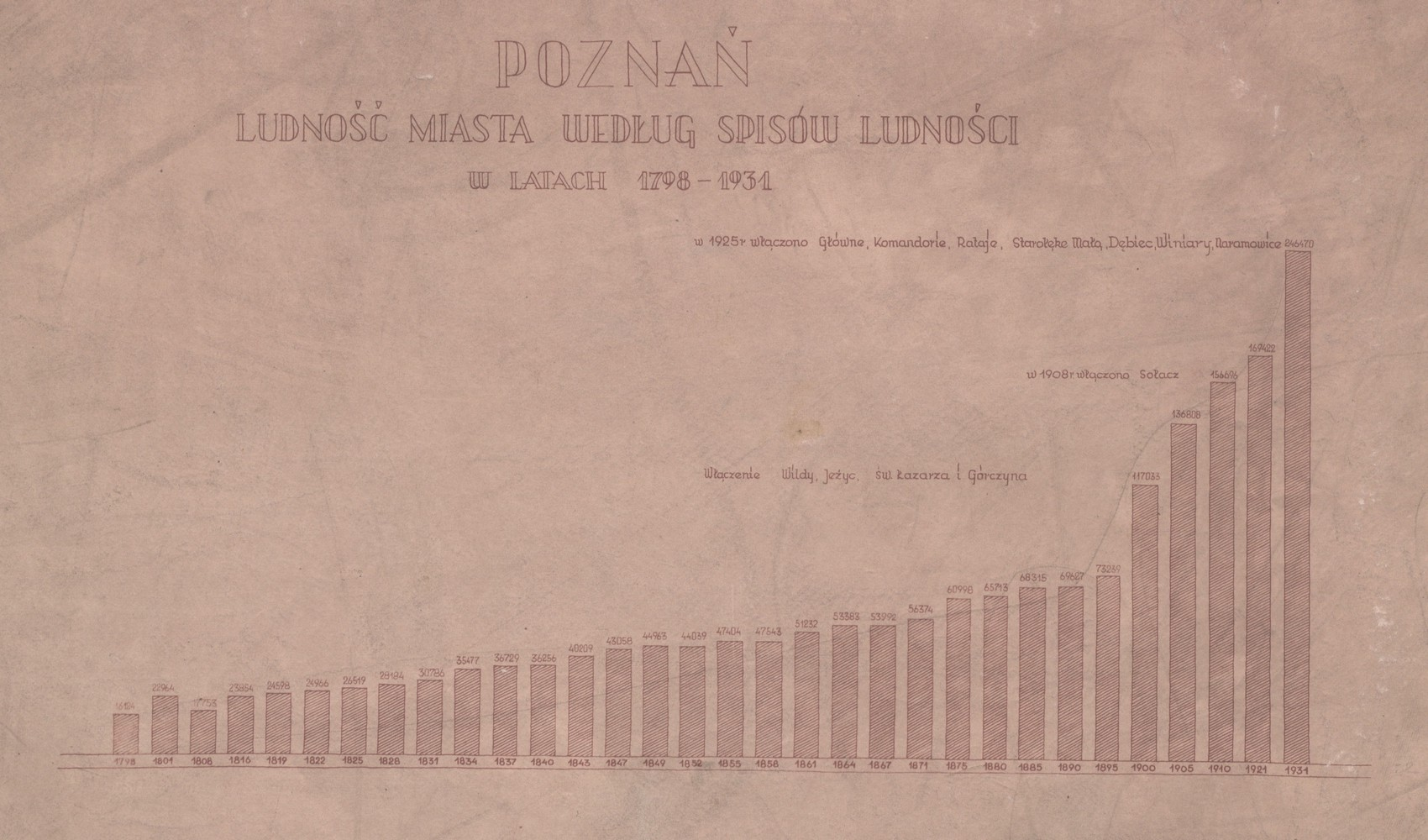
Population bar chart from 1798 to 1931

The following table contains information on the historical population of the city of Poznań in western Poland.

For details of the historical developments, see History of Poznań.

== Table ==
In early Poland and the Polish–Lithuanian Commonwealth
| c. 1250 | 2,000–3,000 inhabitants |
| c. 1350 | about 4,000 inhabitants |
| c. 1600 | about 20,000 inhabitants in the whole conurbation (8,000 within the city walls, 8,000–9,000 in the left-bank suburbs, 3,000–3,500 on the right bank) |
| c. 1650 | about 14,000 inhabitants (after the Second Northern War of 1655-57: settlement of 200-300 Scots) |
| c. 1700 | about 12,000 inhabitants (continuing decline in population due to wars, floods and plague) |
| 1732 | 4,000 inhabitants (according to notes of town scribe Jan Rzepecki ) |
| 1733 | 6,000 inhabitants |
Under Prussian rule
| 1794 | 12,538 inhabitants (census data); the population at this time was about 20% Jewish and 10% German |
| 1796 | 16,124 inhabitants (census data) |
| 1800 | 18,779 inhabitants (census data; 21,473 including the garrison) |
| 1816 | 18,000 inhabitants (67% Poles, 22% Jews and 11% Germans); 24,000 including the garrison |
| 1824 | 22,000 inhabitants |
| 1831 | 31,000 inhabitants |
| 1848 | 42,000 inhabitants (43% Poles, 40% Germans, 17% Jews); 45,000 including the garrison |
| 1850 | 43,000 inhabitants |
| 1860 | 43,000 inhabitants; 49,000 including the garrison |
| 1861 | 51,000 inhabitants |
| 1867 | 47,000 civil inhabitants (47% Poles, 38% Germans, 15% Jews) |
| 1870 | 54,400 inhabitants |
| 1871 | 65,000 inhabitants (including the garrison; in 1885 there were 4,800 soldiers in the garrison) |
| 1890 | 69,627 inhabitants (census data) (51% Poles) |
| 1895 | 73,200 inhabitants |
| 1900 | 110,000 inhabitants (plus 7,000 soldiers in the garrison); from 1896 to 1907 new areas came within the city boundaries, increasing its size from 7.8 to 33.9 square kilometres |
| 1905 | 136,800 inhabitants |
| 1910 | 156,696 civil inhabitants (census data; 57% Poles), plus 6,200 soldiers in the garrison (rising to 10,000 by 1913) |
| 1917 | 156,357 inhabitants (government data) |
| 1918 | 156,091 inhabitants (government data) |
In the Second Polish Republic *data calculated from records of deaths, births and migration numbers
| 1919 | 158,185 inhabitants* |
| 1920 | 162,902 inhabitants* |
| 1921 | 169,422 inhabitants (census data at 30 September; includes 92,089 women) |
| 1922 | 178,229 inhabitants* |
| 1923 | 185,521 inhabitants* |
| 1924 | 193,228 inhabitants* |
| 1925 | 220,023 inhabitants* |
| 1926 | 226,828 inhabitants* |
| 1927 | 237,048 inhabitants* |
| 1928 | 248,426 inhabitants* |
| 1929 | 261,597 inhabitants* |
| 1930 | 266,742 inhabitants* |
| 1931 | 246,698 inhabitants (census data at December 9); 236,200 Poles, 6,400 Germans, 1,100 Jews, 200 Ukrainians, 100 Russians, 100 others; 131,929 women |
| 1932 | 248,763 inhabitants* |
| 1933 | 252,667 inhabitants* (expansions of the city boundaries in 1925 and 1933 more than doubled its area to 76.9 square kilometres) |
| 1934 | 255,557 inhabitants* |
| 1935 | 260,444 inhabitants* |
| 1936 | 265,271 inhabitants* |
| 1937 | 268,794 inhabitants* |
| 1938 | 272,653 inhabitants* |
| June 1, 1939 | 274,155 inhabitants (the true figure was probably up to 10,000 higher) |
Under Nazi occupation *German data used in the trial of Arthur Greiser
| September 1, 1940 | 287,862 inhabitants (81% Poles; 18% Germans; 2% others) |
| January 1, 1941 | 296,790 inhabitants (80% Poles; 20% Germans; 1% others) |
| August 1, 1941 | 308,051 inhabitants (77% Poles; 23% Germans; 1% others) |
| February 1, 1942 | 318,208 inhabitants (75% Poles; 25% Germans; 1% others) |
| January 1, 1943 | 326,572 inhabitants (74% Poles; 26% Germans; 1% others) |
| October 1, 1943 | 327,026 inhabitants (73% Poles; 26% Germans; 1% others) |
| April 1, 1944 | 323,747 inhabitants (71% Poles; 28% Germans; 1% others) |
| 1939–1945 | During World War II about 8,600 of the pre-war inhabitants were murdered (inc. about 1,500 Jews); 3,620 were taken to Germany as slave workers (20% of them died); 38,256 inhabitants of Polish nationality were resettled to the General Government, over 60,000 were deprived of their property and expelled from their homes (Verdrägung, Polish rugi). Approximately 90,000 Germans were settled in the city. In total 14,413 of the pre-war inhabitants died during the war (4,025 as a result of the combat, 2,255 executed, 6,382 died in concentration camps and prisons, 735 died as slave workers in Germany, 1,070 died of disease or starvation). Approximately 2,000 persons are unaccounted for. The area of the city was also significantly increased in 1940–1942, to 226 square kilometres. |
In the Polish People's Republic
| 1946 | 268,000 inhabitants. Following the invasion of Poland and the post-war migration and expulsions of Germans from Polish territory by the Soviets, the ethnic composition of the city's population would become almost exclusively Polish, resembling its distant past. |
| 1950 | 320,700 inhabitants |
| 1960 | 408,100 inhabitants |
| 1970 | 471,900 inhabitants |
| 1975 | 516,000 inhabitants |
| 1980 | 552,900 inhabitants |
| 1988 | 591,300 inhabitants. This is the highest population so far recorded for Poznań (it follows the addition of new areas to the city in 1974 and 1987, bringing its total area to 261.3 square kilometres). Later, migration from the city to surrounding areas would cause the population to fall. |
In the Third Polish Republic
| 1990 | 590,049 inhabitants |
| 1995 | 581,772 inhabitants |
| 2000 | 572,900 inhabitants |
| March 31, 2002 | 571,571 inhabitants, according to official records (53% female) |
| May 2002 | 578,900 inhabitants, according to census data (54% female) |
| 2009 | 556,022 inhabitants (statistical office data) |

The above figures do not include a significant number of students (approximately 60,000) resident temporarily in Poznań during the academic year.

== See also ==
- History of Poznań
- Demographics of Poland
