= Cybina =

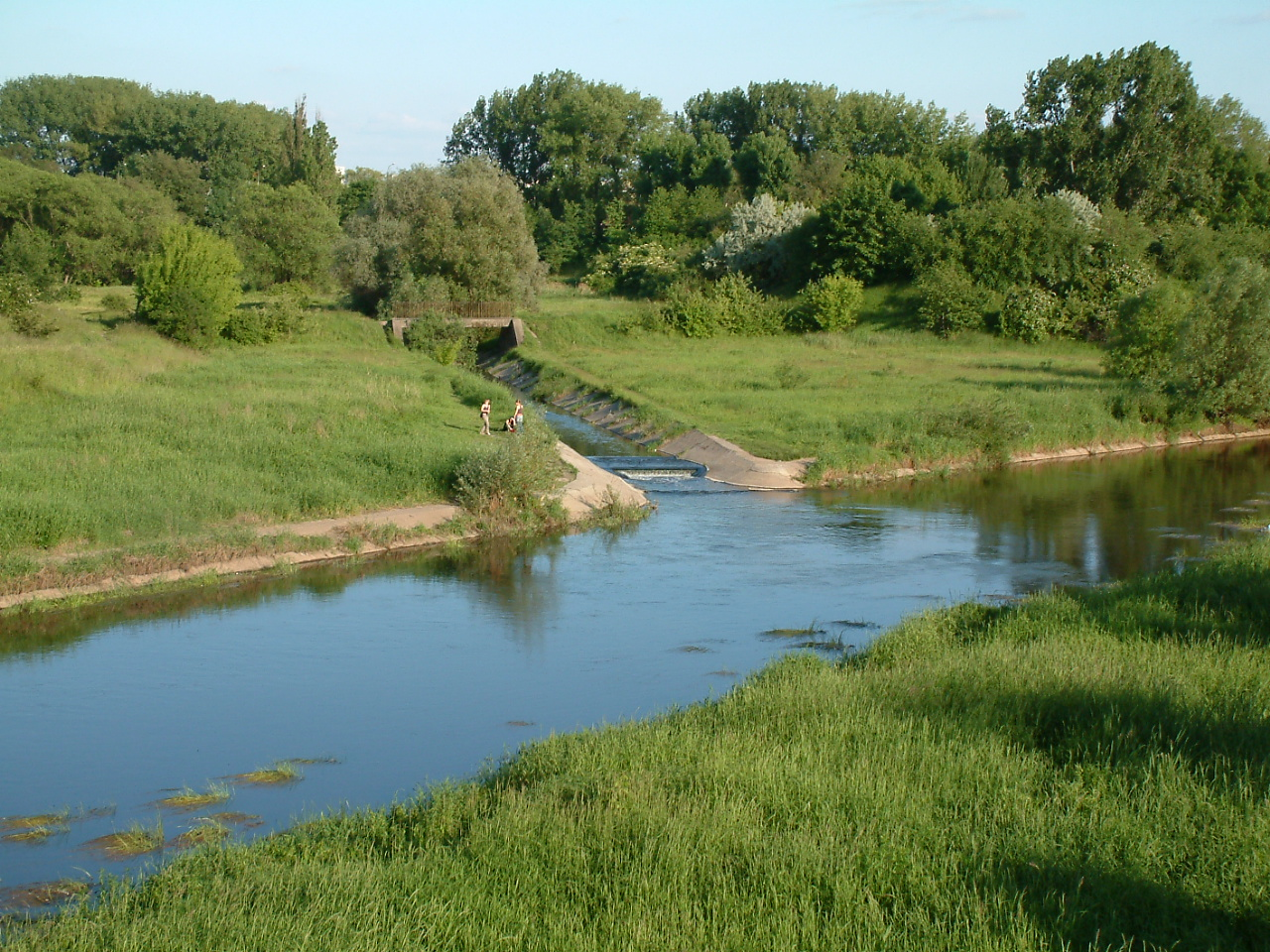
- Mouth of Cybina

Location
- Country: Poland

Physical characteristics
- Mouth
  - location: Warta
  - coordinates: 52°24′35″N 16°57′06″E

Basin features
- Progression: Warta→ Oder→ Baltic Sea

Cybina [t͡sɨˈbina] is a river in Greater Poland, a right affluent of Warta. It starts near the village Iwno and after 43 km falls into the right branch of Warta, which is also called Cybina or Kanał Ulgi, in Poznań. Cybina flows through two big lakes: Swarzędzkie Lake and Lake Malta. This last one is a barrier lake.
