= Ugo Raczynski =

French football manager (born 1977)

Personal information
- Full name: Ugo Pierre Jean Guy Raczynski
- Date of birth: November 30, 1977 (age 48)
- Place of birth: Nancy, France
- Position: Defender

Team information
- Current team: Sion U16

Senior career*
Years	Team	Apps	(Gls)
2004–2005	Martigny-Sports		
2005–2013	FC Bex		
2013–2015	Vevey		

Managerial career
- 2013–2015: Vevey
- 2015–2020: Martigny-Sports
- 2020–: Sion U16
- 2021: Sion
- * Club domestic league appearances and goals

Ugo Pierre Jean Guy Raczynski (born 30 November 1977) is a French professional football manager, who manages the Sion U16s.

== Managerial career ==
An amateur footballer, Raczynski began managing with the amateur side Vevey from 2013 to 2015. In 2015, he was appointed the manager of Martigny-Sports, where he stayed for six seasons. He left Martigny-Sports on 16 October 2020 after the COVID-19 pandemic, and joined FC Sion as the manager of their U16s. On 11 March 2021, Raczynski was appointed the interim coach for Sion for a period of 20 days, as they looked for a new manager. Marco Walker succeeded Raczynski six days later, on 17 March 2021.
