= Łęki Małe, Łódź Voivodeship =

Łęki Małe
- Village
- Location within Poland
- Coordinates: 51°21′21″N 18°26′34″E
- Country: Poland
- Voivodeship: Łódź
- County: Wieruszów
- Gmina: Lututów
- Population: 120

Łęki Małe (Polish pronunciation: [ˈwɛŋkʲi ˈmawɛ]) is a village in the administrative district of Gmina Lututów, within Wieruszów County, Łódź Voivodeship, in central Poland.
