= Raczyński Library =

The Raczyński Library Biblioteka Raczyńskich w Poznaniu
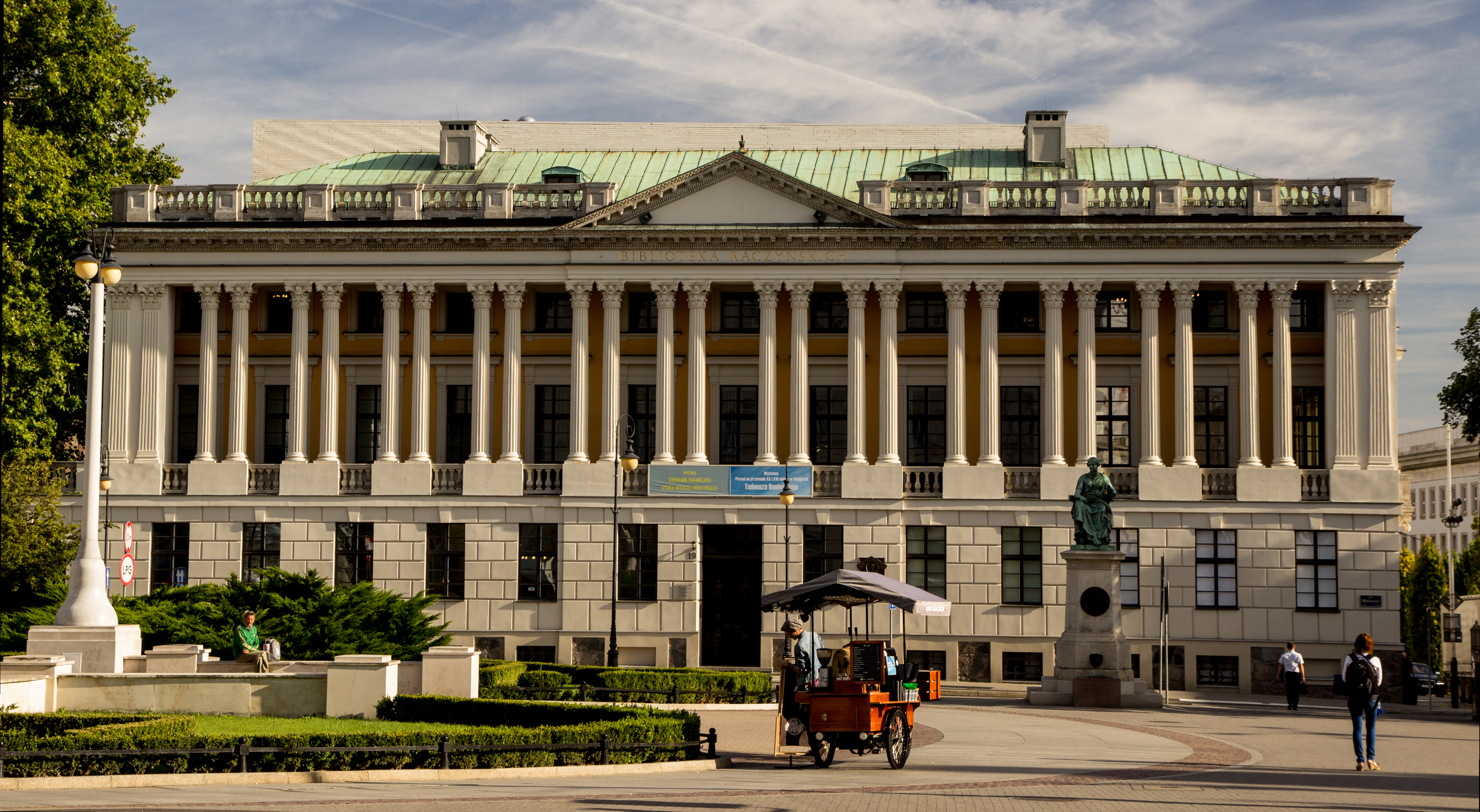
- The façade of the library

- Location within Poland Location within Greater Poland Voivodeship
- 52°24′30″N 16°55′42″E
- Location: Poznań, Poland

History
- Built: 1822–1828

Site notes
- Architect: Ch. Percier
- Architectural style: Neoclassicism
- Governing body: City of Poznań

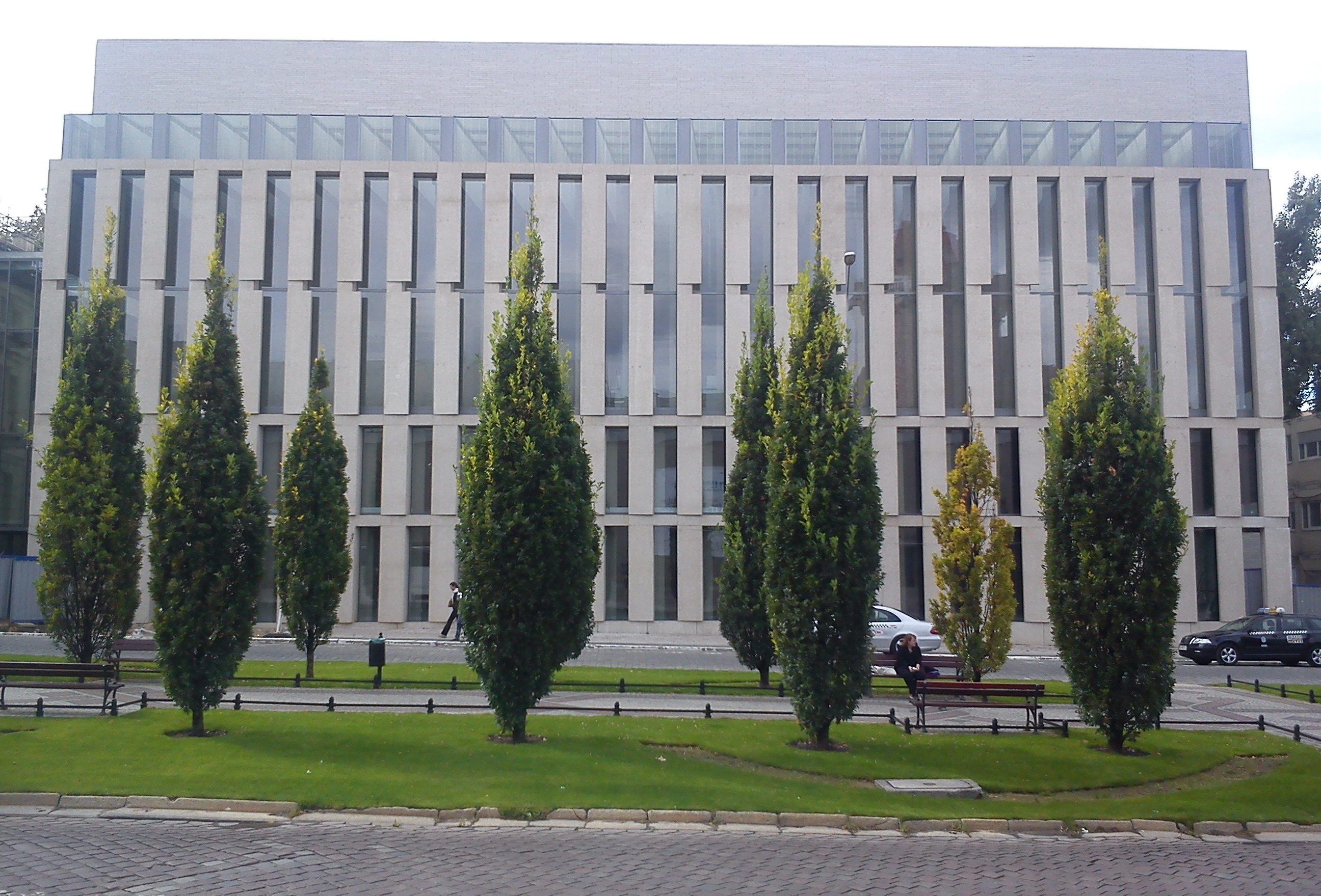
New wing of the library opened in 2013

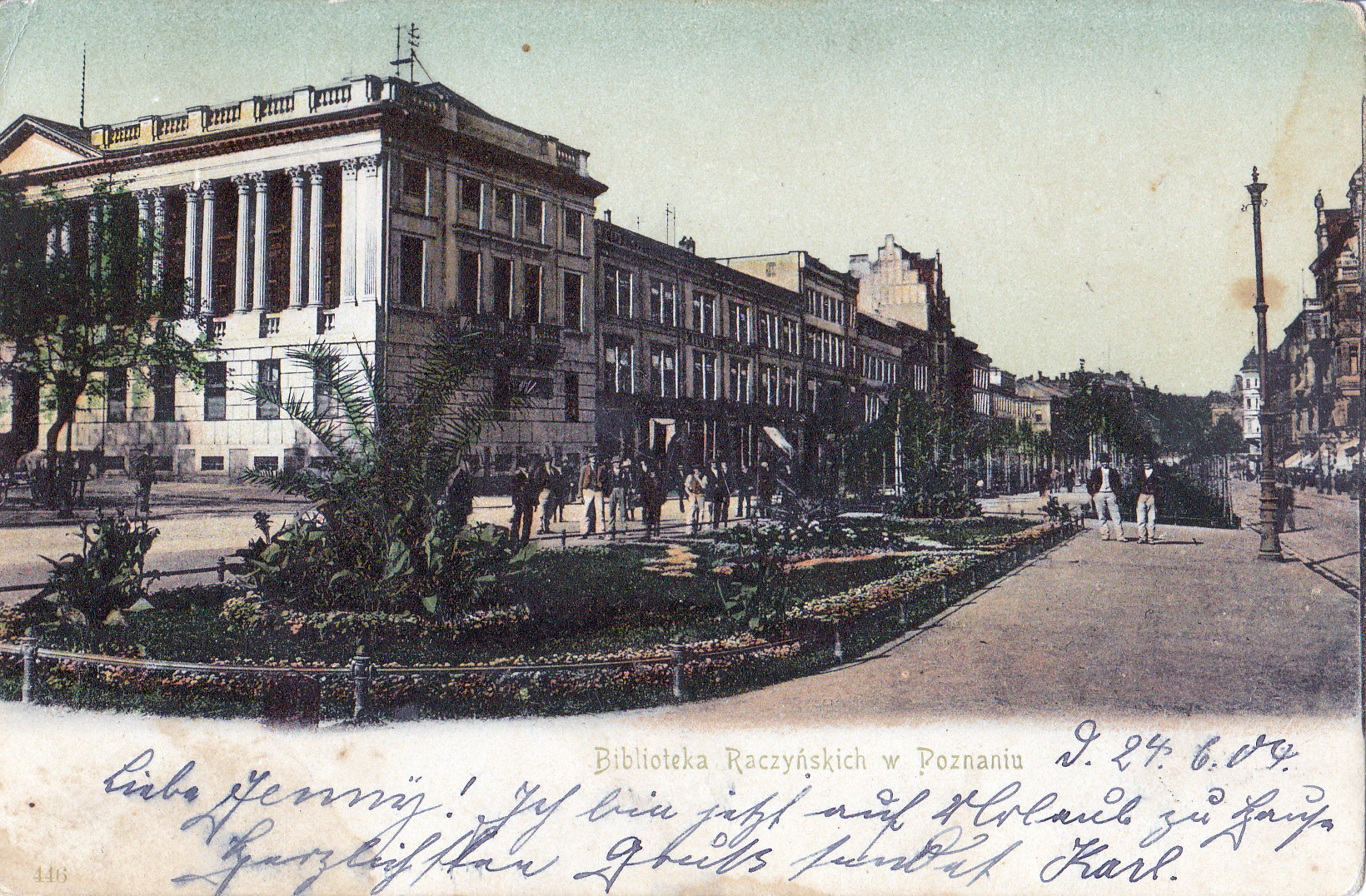
Postcard of the library from 1904

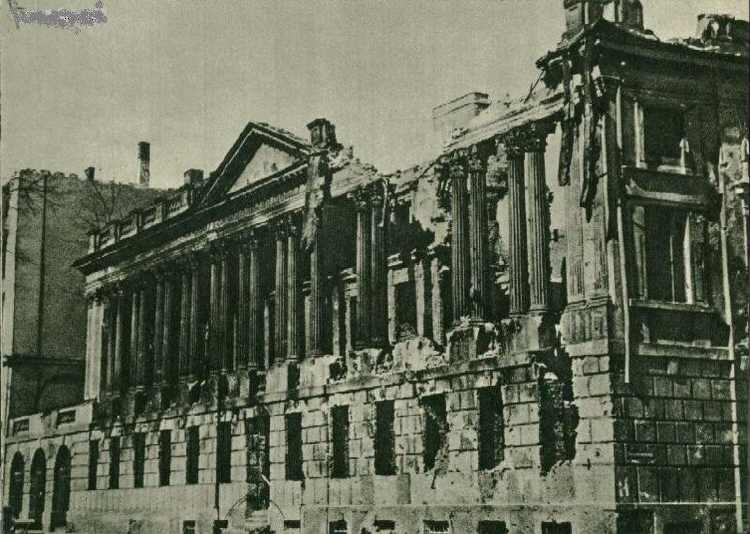
The library in ruins, intentionally demolished with explosives by Nazi German troops, 1945

The Raczyński Library (Polish: Biblioteka Raczyńskich w Poznaniu) is a public library founded by Count Edward Raczyński in Poznań. The library's building was erected in 1822–1828 with the financial support of the Edward Raczyński Foundation. The structure of the classical building features a colonnade reminiscent of the eastern façade of the Louvre. In front of the main building of the library stands the Hygieia's Fountain statue created by Albert Wolff in 1841.

== History ==
The neoclassicist building of the library is located at Liberty Square (Plac Wolności). During the Second World War the building was demolished with explosives by the Nazi German troops and nearly all of the library's books (90%) were destroyed in the resulting fire, except for the special collections looted earlier by Nazi Germany. In 1953, the library was rebuilt according to the project by Janina Czarnecka. In 1994, the library was in possession of around 252,000 books.

Between 2010 and 2013 a new wing of the library was constructed, which helped to better display the library's collections. It was officially opened on 1 July 2013 and covers the area of 11,000 square metres and was co-financed by European Union funds.

The current director of the library is Anna Gruszecka.

The library also exercises control over the museums of such writers as Henryk Sienkiewicz, Kazimiera Iłłakowiczówna and Józef Ignacy Kraszewski.

== Past directors ==
The directors of the library:

- (1829-1852) Józef Łukaszewicz
- (1852-1868) Antoni Popliński
- (1868-1901) Maksymilian Sosnowski
- (1902-1912) Oswald Collmann
- (1913-1914) Wilhelm Christiani
- (1916), (1918-1919) Adolf Kunkel
- (1919-1928) Antoni Bederski
- (1929-1939) Andrzej Wojtkowski
- (1939-1941) Józef Raczyński
- (1941-1945) Paul Sattler
- (1945-1947) Józef Frieske
- (1948) Halina Kurkówna
- (1949-1953) Feliks Róg-Mazurek
- (1954) Wacław Lica
- (1955-1956) Leon Pawlak
- (1957-1962) Bernard Olejniczak
- (1964-1972) Helena Seidel
- (1962-1963), (1972-1977), (1981-1997) Janusz Dembski
- (1977-1981) Alfred Laboga
- (1997-2014) Wojciech Spaleniak
- (2014–present) Anna Gruszecka

== See also ==
- History of Poznań
- Załuski Library
- Jagiellonian Library
- Ossolineum
- National Library of Poland
- List of libraries in Poland
