= Nowe Miasto, Poznań =

Neighborhood in Poznań, Poland

Coordinates: 52.3717°N 16.9844°E

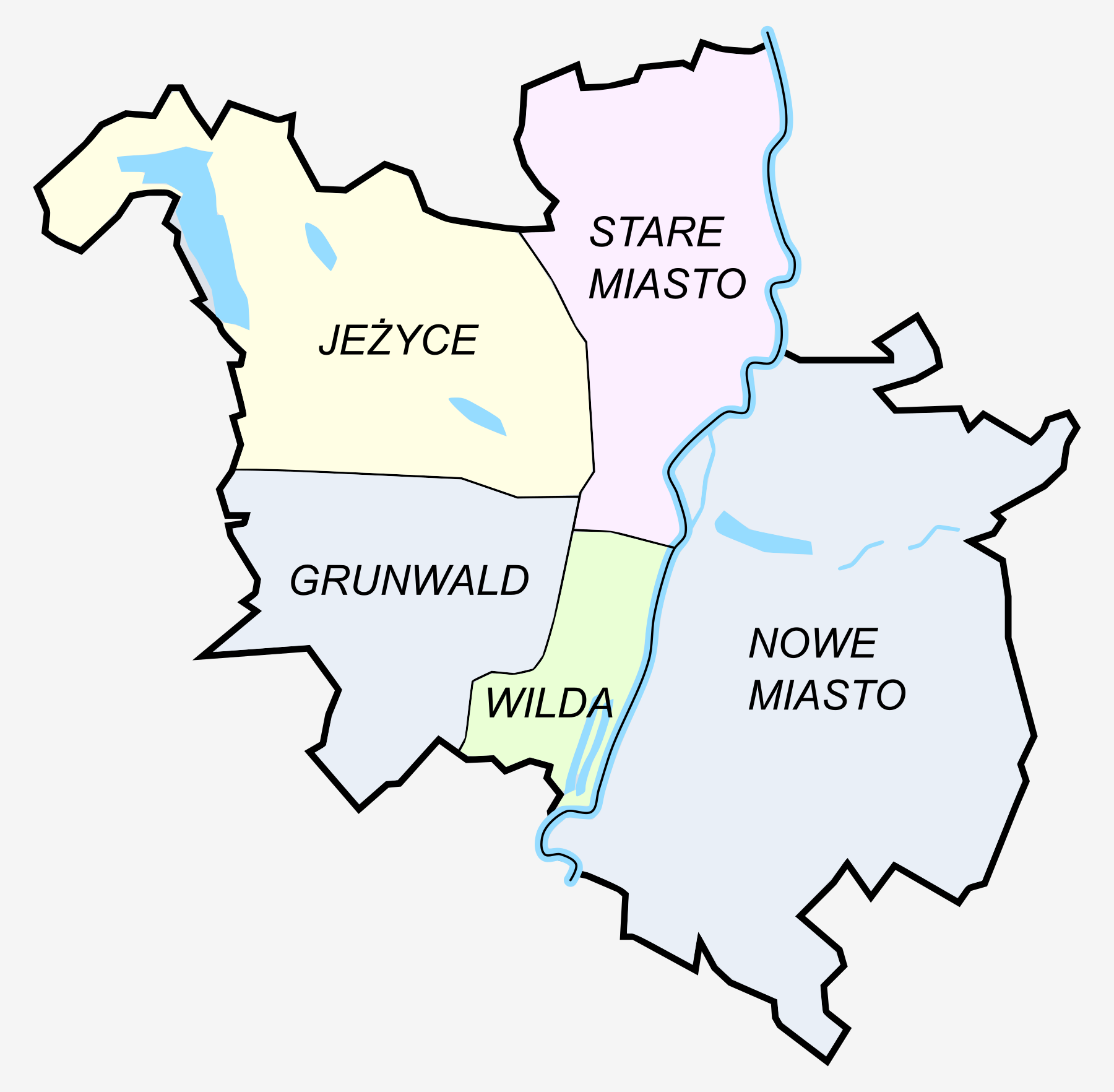
Local government districts of Poznań

Nowe Miasto (Polish: [ˈnɔvɛ ˈmjastɔ]; "New Town") is a part of the city of Poznań in western Poland. It was one of the five governmental districts (dzielnicas) into which the city was divided prior to 1990, and which are retained for certain administrative purposes. For details (and for the current governmental division of the district into osiedles), see Administrative division of Poznań.

Nowe Miasto consists of those parts of the city which lie on the right (east) bank of the Warta river. It includes the island of Ostrów Tumski, which lies between the two channels of the river and on which the city's cathedral stands. Nowe Miasto includes some of the most historical parts of the city (Śródka, Komandoria) as well as the extensive modern residential areas of Rataje.

The district covers an area of 105.1 square kilometres (40.6 sq mi) and has a population of 141,424 (at 30 June 2008).

Nowe Miasto borders the districts of Stare Miasto ("Old Town") and Wilda to the west. It is also bordered by the administrative districts (gminas) of Czerwonak to the north, Swarzędz to the north-east, Kleszczewo to the east, and Kórnik to the south-east.

== History ==
Coat of arms of Ostrów Tumski

Although settlements on Ostrów Tumski and on the neighbouring east bank of the Warta were established before the end of the 1st millennium, they did not become part of the city of Poznań until after the Partitions of Poland. It was in 1800, under Prussian rule, that the ecclesiastical possession of Ostrów Tumski, including Chwaliszewo (a town in its own right since the 15th century), and the east-bank towns of Śródka, Ostrówek (a part of the Śródka district, but a town in its own right) and Łacina (or St. Roch; to the south of Śródka), were incorporated into the city of Poznań. In 1896 the small neighbourhoods of Piotrowo and Berdychowo became part of the city.

The next major expansion of the city boundaries on the east side was in 1925, when they took in Komandoria, Główna, Rataje (the western part of the area of today's Rataje estates), and Starołęka Mała (the northern part of Starołęka). Most of the remainder of today's Nowe Miasto district was incorporated into the city in the expansion carried out under Nazi occupation in 1940–1942. German names used at that time for districts in the east of the city included Oststadt (Główna), Heinrichstadt (Śródka, Komandoria and areas to the east), Seehof (Antonin), Johannistal (Rataje), Gutenbrunn (Kobylepole), Bamberg (Żegrze, the southern part of today's Rataje), and Luisenhain (Starołęka).

The Janikowo neighbourhood (part of the village of Janikowo) was brought within the city boundaries in 1987.

== Geography ==
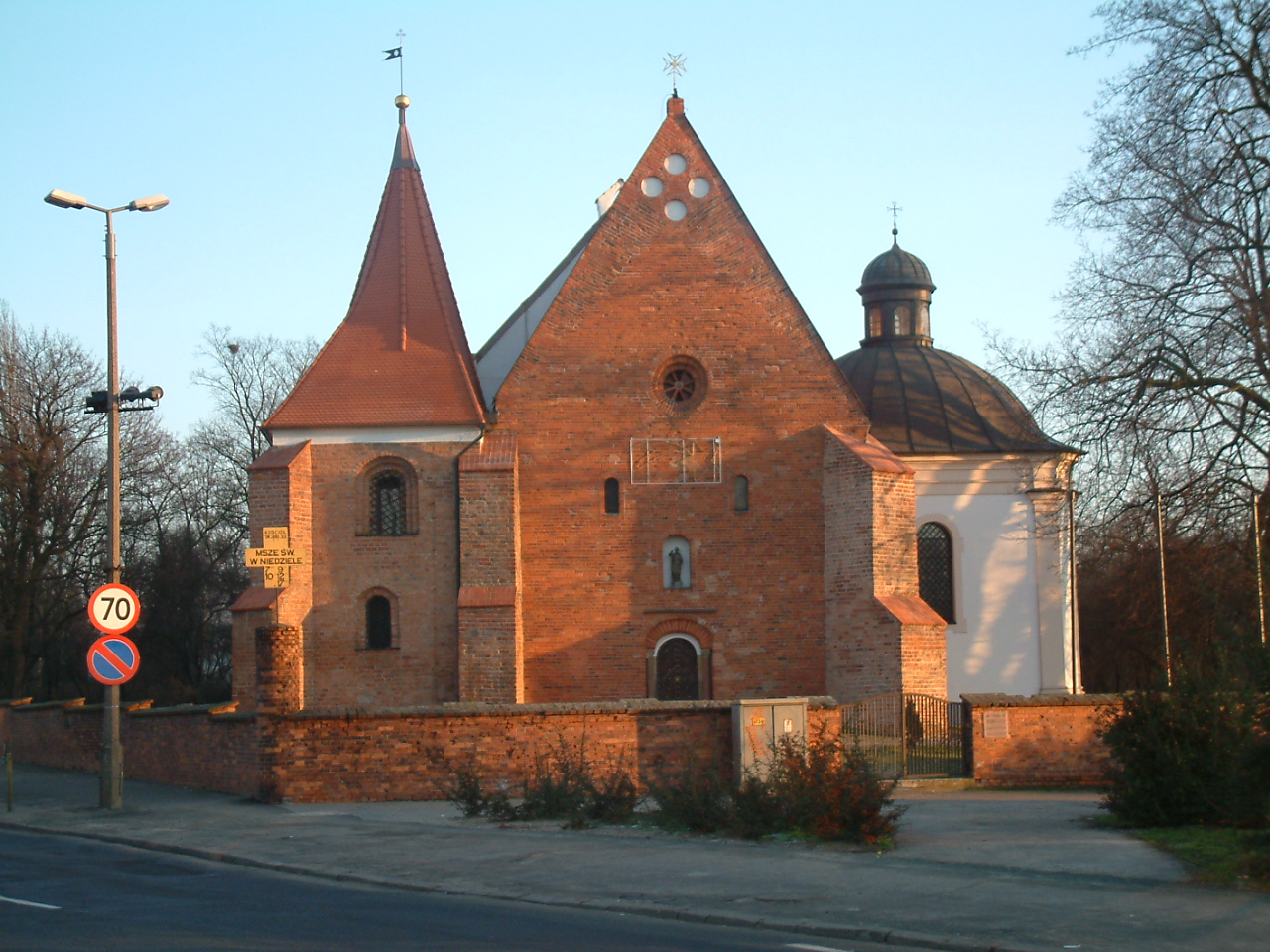
Church of St. John of Jerusalem Outside the Walls, dating from the 10th century

The Cybina river flows through Nowe Miasto, from Swarzędz, to its confluence with the right branch of the Warta in the Ostrów Tumski region. Close to the confluence it broadens into the artificial Lake Malta, which is a popular leisure and water sports venue. There is also a series of smaller lakes further upstream. Ostrów Tumski, an island between the two branches of the Warta (of which the right one is also called Cybina), is also part of Nowe Miasto; it contains Poznań's cathedral as well as other ecclesiastical buildings, and industrial sites to the north of these.

South of Malta are the housing estates of Rataje, one of Poznań's largest modern residential districts, consisting mainly of prefabricated concrete panel blocks, of which the first was completed in 1967. South of Rataje is an industrial area, and then the district of Starołęka, including the smaller neighbourhoods of Minikowo and Marlewo. The most southerly neighbourhoods in Nowe Miasto (and in the city as a whole) are Głuszyna, Piotrowo and Sypniewo. To the east of Starołęka are Krzesiny and Szczepankowo, and the smaller neighbourhoods of Garaszewo, Krzesinki, Huby, Pokrzywno, Spławie and Michałowo. Krzesiny military airport (31st Air Base) is situated between Krzesiny and Głuszyna.

Between Szczepankowo and Rataje is Franowo, which is the site of a major retail park. East of Rataje are Kobylepole and Darzybór, and north of those, on the Cybina, is Nowy Młyn ("New Mill"). Poznań's main zoo is situated in this area. North of this is Antoninek, to the north and east of which are Antonin, Główieniec and Zieliniec, bordering the area of forest which adjoins Swarzędz Lake (Jezioro Swarzędzkie) in the neighbouring town of Swarzędz. Główieniec is also the site of a Volkswagen factory.

A large area to the north of Antoninek is occupied by the Miłostowo cemetery, one of the two main city cemeteries (the other is at Junikowo in Grunwald district). West of Antoninek and north of Lake Malta is a residential estate called Osiedle Warszawskie; further west are the old districts of Komandoria – where the ancient Church of St. John of Jerusalem Outside the Walls stands – and Śródka. North of these is the district of Główna (including Zawady and Nadolnik), which contains a number of industrial sites and older residential quarters. A stream, also called Główna, runs through this region westwards to join the Warta. At the extreme north of Nowe Miasto is the Karolin power and heat cogeneration plant, east of which is the neighbourhood of Janikowo (which is partly a separate village outside the city).

South of Śródka is the main campus of Poznań University of Technology (Politechnika Poznańska).
