= 1952 Poznań Pe-2 crash =

1952 aviation accident

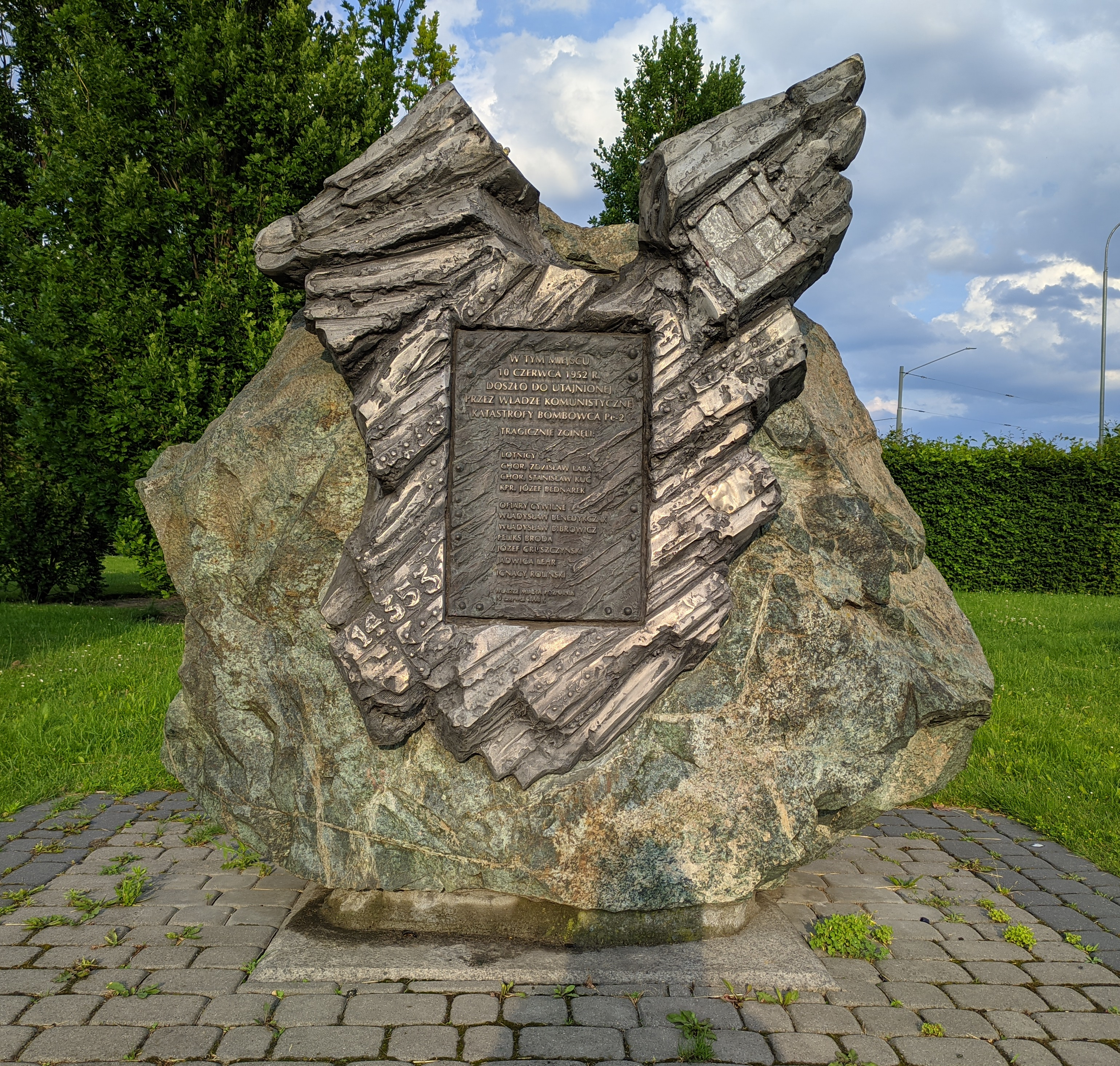
- Monument commemorating the victims of the crash

Accident
- Date: June 10, 1952
- Summary: aircraft collision with the ground
- Site: Poznań, Poland; 52°24′24″N 16°55′25″E
- Total fatalities: 3
- Total injuries: about a dozen people

Aircraft
- Aircraft type: Petlyakov Pe-2FT
- Operator: 21st Reconnaissance Aviation Regiment in Poznań
- Registration: 14353
- Crew: 3

Ground casualties
- Ground fatalities: 6

1952 Poznań Pe-2 crash was an aviation accident that occurred in Poznań on 10 June 1952. The exact number of victims is unknown; it is believed that three crew members and six civilians (pedestrians and workers at the crash site) were killed, while several others sustained injuries. Since the disaster took place during the Stalinist era, all information about it was classified. Although the accident occurred in the city center, it remained forgotten for a long time, even after the democratic transformations of 1989. The first article about it was only published in 2007 in the local press.

== Accident ==
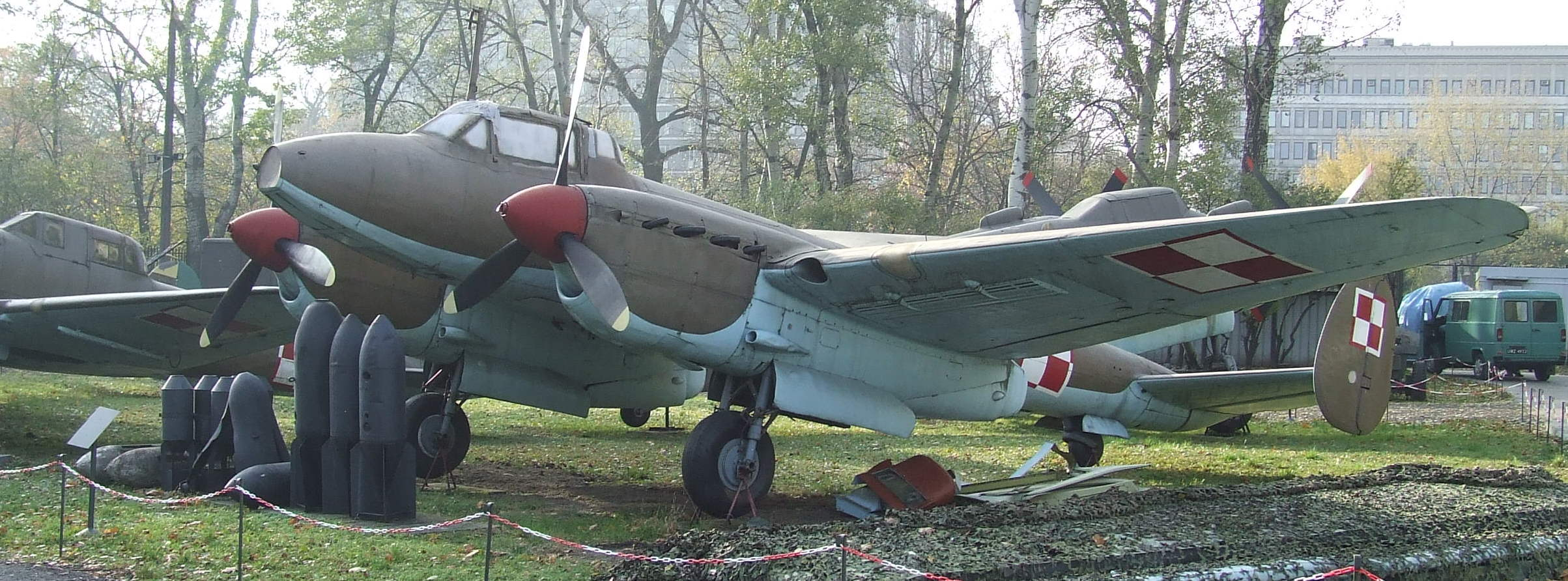
Pe-2FT aircraft in the Polish Army Museum in Warsaw

On 10 June 1952, around 8:30 AM, a Pe-2FT bomber, belonging to the 21st Reconnaissance Aviation Regiment stationed at Poznań–Ławica Airport, was likely performing a training flight over the city. As the aircraft was flying from the Starołęka district towards the airport, the crew reported issues with the right engine, and shortly afterward, the left engine also failed. According to a witness' account, the pilot attempted to make an emergency landing on the Łęgi Dębińskie area by the Warta river. However, when he noticed children playing football there, he decided to continue, probably aiming to land on an undeveloped area near the Church of the Body of Christ on Krakowska Street. The pilot was unable to regain control of the aircraft, which had both engines damaged, resulting in the crash.

The aircraft struck the roof of the Workers' Cooperative building at the intersection and crashed into the embankment of the Queen Jadwiga Bridge being constructed at the time. The force of the impact sent it upwards, after which the plane hit a tram power line pole and fell onto the street. The crash caused an explosion of fuel and ammunition, setting fire to nearby trees and damaging surrounding buildings.

According to one witness, just before the crash, the plane fired from its onboard weaponry into the air to warn those on the ground, allowing some workers at the intersection to take cover; however, this was not confirmed by other witnesses.

The disaster occurred in downtown Poznań, at the intersection of Droga Dębińska Street, Queen Jadwiga Street (then Marchlewski Street), and Garbary. However, its exact location is reported differently in the few sources on the accident. According to the Pamięci lotników wojskowych 1945–2003 publication from 2003, the plane crashed on the southern side of the intersection, where the Poznań University of Physical Education building now stands. In contrast, witness accounts cited in Krzysztof M. Kaźmierczak's Ściśle tajne indicate that the accident took place on the northern side of the intersection, near the Church of the Body of Christ, at the junction of Strzelecka and Krakowska streets (where an apartment block now stands).

== Victims of the disaster ==
Due to the classification of the disaster, the exact number of victims is uncertain and varies across sources. According to a confidential bulletin from the Poznań City Committee of the Polish United Workers' Party, released three days after the accident, two military personnel and five civilians were killed, and 15 people were injured. In the book Pamięci lotników wojskowych 1945–2003, it is mentioned that there were eight fatalities (three military personnel and five civilians) and ten injured. According to journalist Krzysztof M. Kaźmierczak's findings, three crew members, three workers laying telephone lines, and three random pedestrians were definitely killed in the accident. One witness also recalls a seventh civilian victim whose name was not established. The injured were taken to the Social Insurance Hospital on Garbary Street (now the Greater Poland Oncology Center) and to the hospital on Szkolna Street. Most of the wounded were employees of the Poznań City Transport Company, who were working on the tramline construction in the Rataje district, and workers from the Poznań Telecommunication Works Company (now Poztel), who were expanding the telephone network at the time.

The following people perished in the disaster:

- Crew members:
  - Sergeant Zdzisław Lara – pilot (buried in Gidle near Radomsko)
  - Sergeant Stanisław Kuć – navigator (survived the crash but died hours later in the hospital from serious injuries)
  - Józef Bednarek – gunner and radio telegraphist
- Poznań Telecommunication Works employees:
  - Władysław Benedyczak
  - Feliks Broda
  - Józef Gruszczyński
- Random passersby:
  - Władysław Bibrowicz – craftsman, owner of a locksmith workshop
  - Ignacy Roliński – retiree (burned by burning fuel, died four days after the accident)
  - Jadwiga Lehr – widow

The exact number and names of several injured individuals cannot be established due to the destruction of hospital records.

== Causes of the disaster ==
After the accident, a commission from the Air Force Command was established to investigate its causes. The chairman of the five-member commission was General Ivan Turkiel, a Russian who served as the commander of the air force in Poland from 1950 to 1956. In addition to him, the commission included three Soviet officers and one Polish officer.

The investigation lasted only three days, and the commission concluded its work on June 13. The report acknowledged a technical malfunction (failure of the right engine due to cylinder sleeve seal failure), but the blame for the disaster was placed on the pilot, who was said to have panicked and mishandled the emergency landing.

According to Pamięci lotników wojskowych 1945–2003, a likely cause of the accident was the pilot making a turn at too low an altitude.

Journalist Krzysztof M. Kaźmierczak, who investigated the disaster, argued that the actual cause was not pilot error but rather the poor technical condition of the Soviet bomber. Kaźmierczak emphasizes that according to witness testimonies, both engines (not just the right one) failed (the plane was flying silently), and that a year earlier, on 16 January 1951, a similar accident involving a Pe-2FT from Poznań occurred due to an engine malfunction, resulting in the death of the entire crew. He also refers to Order No. 0157 from the Air Force Command, issued on 14 June 1952, four days after the accident and one day after the commission's investigation ended. This order instructed the inspection of all Pe-2FT aircraft engines for the tightness of the upper cylinder sleeve seals. As a result of this inspection, six engines were dismantled, four were repaired without removal from the aircraft, and seven engine blocks were replaced. Kaźmierczak believes this points to a recurring technical flaw. He argues that, at the time of the disaster, Pe-2FT aircraft were overused and overloaded, partly due to the addition of extra armor on the underside of the fuselage, which led to engine failures. Due to the high failure rate, Polish pilots were reportedly afraid to fly these planes.

== Secrecy surrounding the disaster ==
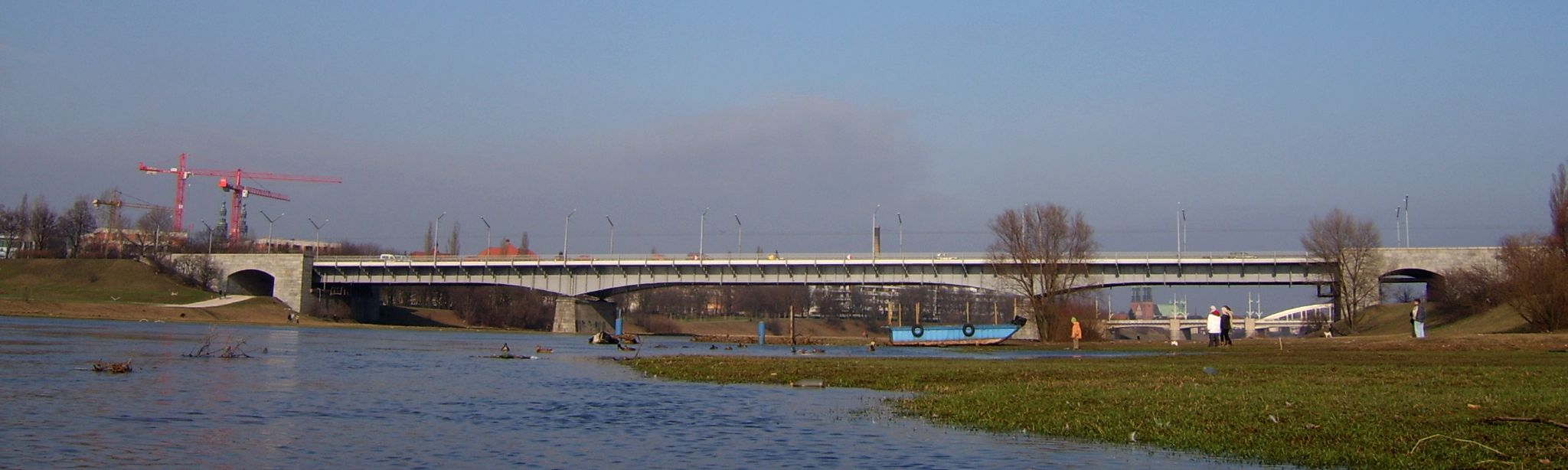
Queen Jadwiga Bridge in Poznań, near which the disaster occurred

The crash site near Queen Jadwiga Bridge in Poznań was immediately cordoned off by the militia, preventing access to bystanders. Despite this, some people managed to reach the site, including young boys who collected fragments of the aircraft and its equipment as souvenirs. An attempt by Jerzy Stasiak, a student at the Poznań University of Engineering, to photograph the crash site was thwarted when his camera was confiscated. There was no mention of the disaster in the press or on the radio, nor was it reported by the Polish division of Radio Free Europe, which had begun broadcasting just a month earlier. The only reference to the event appeared in a confidential bulletin issued by the Municipal Committee of the Polish United Workers' Party for local party leadership.

Victims' family members and witnesses were intimidated by officers of the Ministry of Public Security and instructed not to discuss the accident in private conversations. This secrecy was a product of broader tendencies during the Stalinist era when any accidents contradicted the official propaganda narrative. It was also influenced by the fact that the aircraft involved in the crash had been manufactured in the Soviet Union, which was portrayed as a leader in scientific and technological progress. Even after the Polish October in 1956, censorship continued to block the publication of any materials related to the disaster.

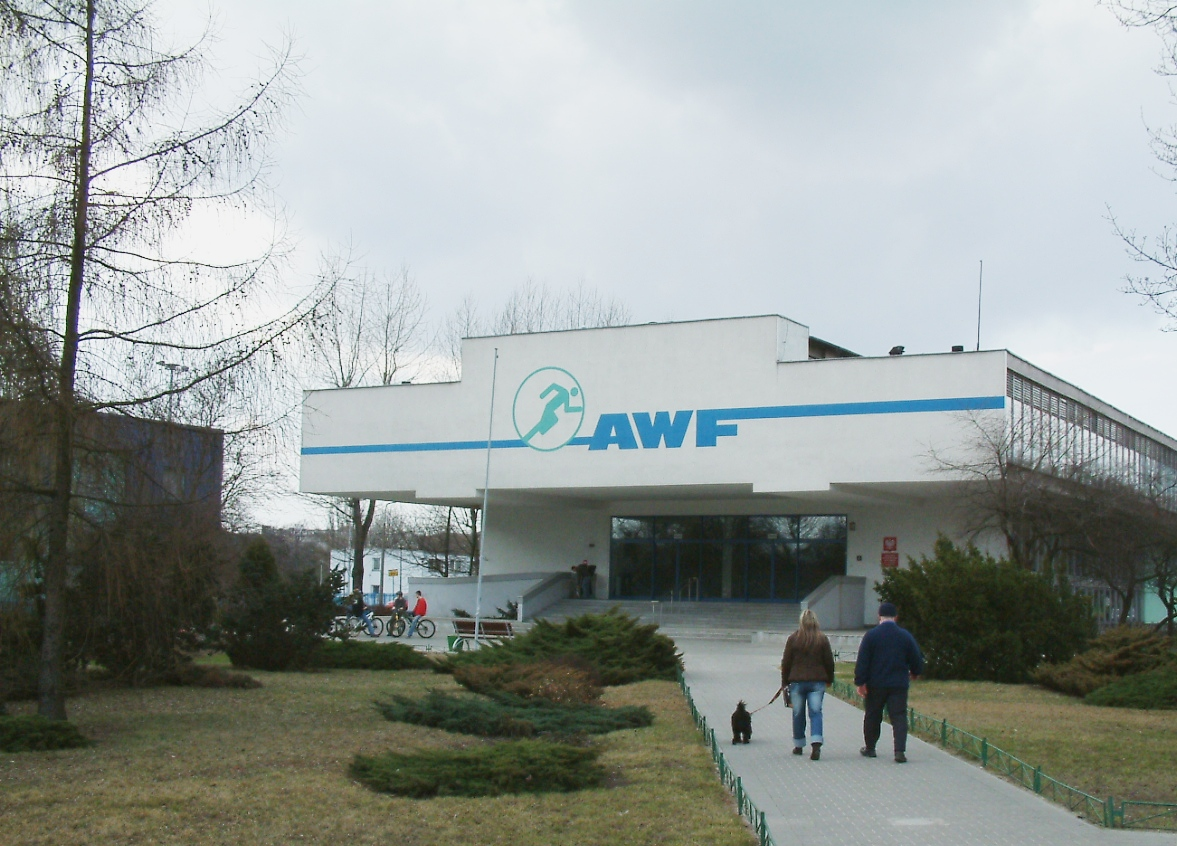
Building of Poznań University of Physical Education. According to one source, the building (constructed in 1973) stands on the site where the plane crashed in 1952

The secrecy resulted in the event being largely erased from the collective memory of Poznań's residents, despite its occurrence in the city center and its tragic toll of nine fatalities and multiple injuries. The incident remained unknown even after the political transformation of 1989. The first mention of it in uncensored sources appeared in the specialist publication Pamięci lotników wojskowych 1945–2003, published in 2003.

In 2007, journalist Krzysztof M. Kaźmierczak investigated the case and published an article in Głos Wielkopolski in June of that year. He later detailed the disaster in a chapter of his 2009 book Ściśle tajne – nieznane fakty z historii Wielkopolski 1945–1989. Following the article's publication, the Institute of National Remembrance launched an investigation in October 2007 into the falsification of documents related to the crash by security officials to obscure its true causes and circumstances.

On 10 June 2008, the 56th anniversary of the crash, a memorial was unveiled at the crash site. Designed by Roman Kosmala, the monument takes the form of a boulder featuring a fragment of the bomber's fuselage, discovered in 1952 by a witness and preserved until its installation.

== Bibliography ==
- Kaźmierczak, Krzysztof M. (2009). Ściśle tajne: nieznane fakty z historii Wielkopolski 1945–1989 [Top Secret: Unknown Facts from the History of Greater Poland 1945–1989] (in Polish). ISBN 978-83-88965-78-4.
