= Mechowo =

Mechowo may refer to the following places:

- Mechowo, Greater Poland Voivodeship (west-central Poland)
- Mechowo, Pomeranian Voivodeship (north Poland)
- Mechowo, Gryfice County in West Pomeranian Voivodeship (north-west Poland)
- Mechowo, Kamień County in West Pomeranian Voivodeship (north-west Poland)
- Mechowo, Kołobrzeg County in West Pomeranian Voivodeship (north-west Poland)
- Mechowo, Pyrzyce County in West Pomeranian Voivodeship (north-west Poland)
