= Karłowice =

Karłowice may refer to the following places in Poland:

- Karłowice, Lower Silesian Voivodeship (south-west Poland)
- Karłowice, Greater Poland Voivodeship (west-central Poland)
- Karłowice, Opole Voivodeship (south-west Poland)
