= Henryk Jaszczewski =

Polish architect, urban planner and sailor

- Born: August 26, 1921; Poznań, Poland
- Died: October 17, 2013 (aged 92); Warsaw, Poland
- Education: Warsaw University of Technology
- Occupation: Architect
- Awards: Warsaw Uprising Cross
- Projects: "MAK" series of yachts

Henryk Jaszczewski, noms de guerre "Henryk", "Aniołek" (born August 26, 1921 in Poznań, died October 17, 2013 in Warsaw) was a Polish architect, urban planner, sailor, and yacht designer. He was a soldier of the Home Army during the Warsaw Uprising and a prisoner in German prisoner-of-war camps. He held the rank of corporal officer cadet. Jaszczewski was a member of the Association of Polish Architects (SARP) and the Association of Polish Artists and Designers (ZPAP), and the creator of the popular "MAK" series of yachts.

== Life ==
Henryk Jaszczewski's family came from Kyiv. His father, Rajmund Jaszczewski, was a lawyer. He met Henryk's future mother, Janina Zdrojewska, while serving as a volunteer soldier in the 1st Józef Piłsudski Light Cavalry Regiment during the Polish–Soviet War. Henryk was born on August 26, 1921, in Poznań and spent his childhood in the nearby Starołęka (now a district of Poznań). His father, Rajmund, worked as a prosecutor in Poznań. Later, the family moved to Warsaw due to his work at the Ministry of Justice. Henryk attended a prestigious boarding school at the Rydzyna Castle. From a young age, he was passionate about sailing and shooting.

Due to the outbreak of World War II, he did not return to the school in Rydzyna and remained in Warsaw. His father and the rest of the family went to the ministry's post in Dubno. Henryk, along with his friend Andrzej Dromlewicz, attempted to reach the Polish army gathering on the other side of the Bug River or his family in Dubno. However, they had to turn back from their journey east. On their way back, the small group he was traveling with was attacked by a German Storch plane. After Henryk shot the machine gun operator, the plane flew away. Upon returning to Warsaw, he joined the Home Army but was granted leave to participate in clandestine architecture courses at the Warsaw University of Technology. During the war, as a distinguished student, he began working in the clandestine Architectural and Urban Planning Studio, run by architects: Zygmunt Skibniewski, Kazimierz Marczewski, and Stanisław Rychłowski. The studio conducted research on housing construction and created a general plan for Warsaw.

During the Warsaw Uprising, he served in the V District (Mokotów) of the Warsaw District of the Home Army – in the squadron of the 1st Light Cavalry Regiment, and later in platoon 686 of the "Oaza" Battalion. Just before the uprising, he was ordered to report to a sapper unit in Powiśle, where his insurgent activities began. He used his sailing experience to organize several crossings of the Vistula river for insurgents, using, among other things, a setting pole boat recovered from the water and hidden by a fisherman he knew. In total, he transported several dozen people. When the Germans attacked Sadyba, where he was staying, with tanks, he fled to Mokotów. In the last days of September, during the German assault on Mokotów, armed with a German machine gun, he covered the retreat of his unit into the sewers. He was the last to enter the sewer and, along with his unit, walked through the sewers for thirteen hours, carrying his machine gun. After the fall of the uprising, he was sent to a camp in Ożarów and then to Stalag X-B, (Note: In an interview for the Oral History Archive of the Warsaw Rising Museum, the second camp he was held in is referred to as Westerkumke.) where he remained until being liberated by British forces. For his participation in the uprising, he was awarded the Warsaw Uprising Cross.

After the war, in 1947, he graduated from the Faculty of Architecture at the Warsaw University of Technology. He also studied architecture at the La Cambre in Brussels. He worked as an architect and urban planner on the post-war reconstruction of Warsaw. He was a member of the Association of Polish Architects (SARP) from 1949 and the Association of Polish Artists and Designers (ZPAP) from 1953.

In the early 1970s, he designed a series of small sailing yachts called "MAK", which were characterized by their simple construction, low building cost, and a sail area of 5 m², which allowed them to be sailed without a license.

He died on October 17, 2013, in Warsaw and was buried on October 23 at the Powązki Military Cemetery in Warsaw.

== Personal life ==
He was married to Stanisława Jaszczewska (née Witkowska, 1923–2018), who was also a Warsaw Uprising insurgent, a Home Army soldier, and an architect.
