= Swarzędz =

Town in Greater Poland Voivodeship, Poland

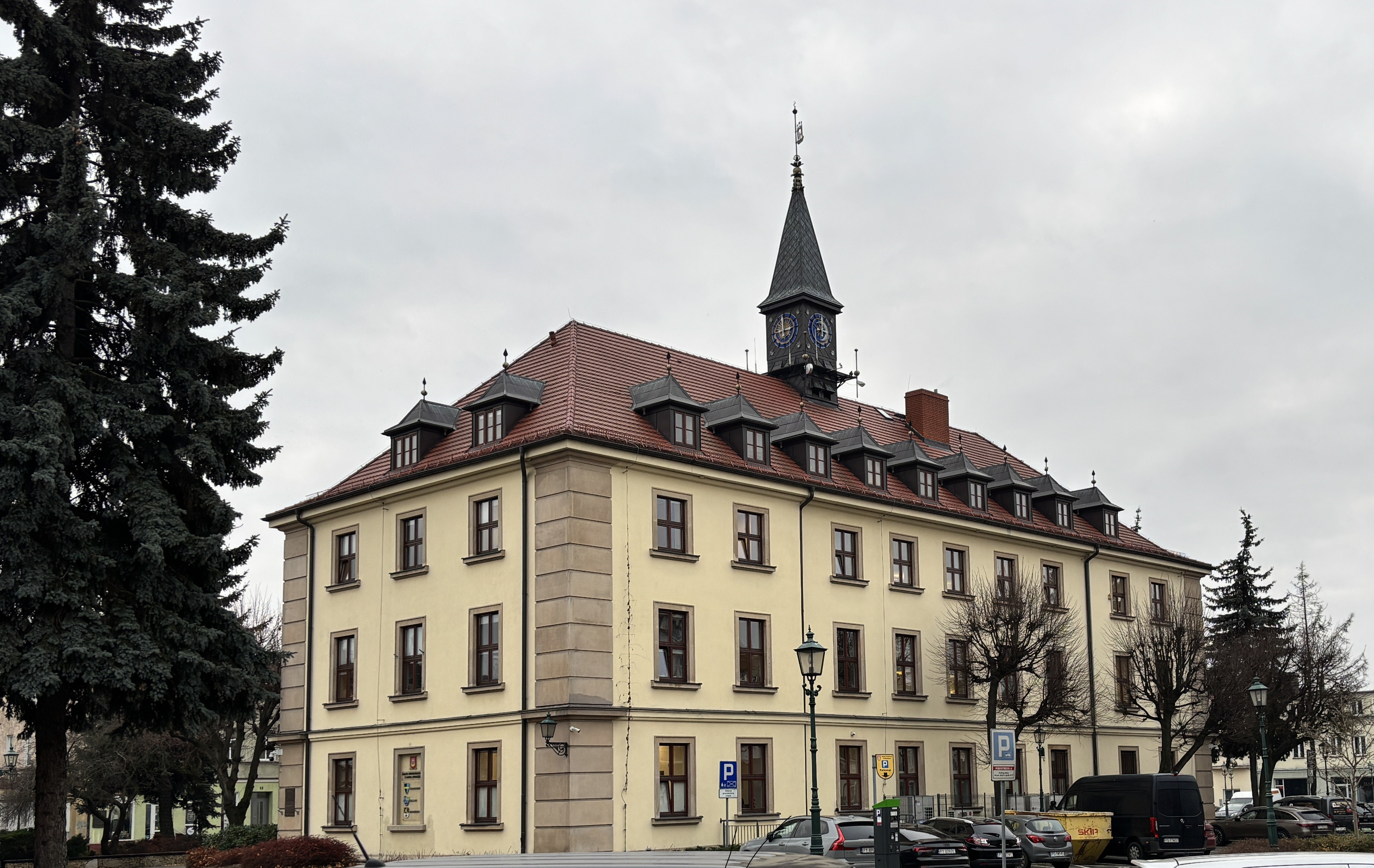
- Town Hall in Swarzędz

- Flag Coat of arms
- Motto: Dobrze trafiłeś / Good choice
- Location within Poland
- Coordinates: 52°24′30″N 17°4′17″E
- Country: Poland
- Voivodeship: Greater Poland
- County: Poznań
- Gmina: Swarzędz
- Established: 14th century
- Town rights: 1638

Government
  - Mayor: Marian Szkudlarek

Area
  - Total: 8.16 km^{2} (3.15 sq mi)

Population (2006)
  - Total: 29,894
  - Density: 3,660/km^{2} (9,490/sq mi)
- Time zone: UTC+1 (CET)
  - Summer (DST): UTC+2 (CEST)
- Postal code: 62-020
- Area code: +48 61
- Car plates: PZ
- Climate: Cfb
- Website: http://www.swarzedz.pl

Swarzędz ([ˈsfaʐɛnt͡s]; German: Schwersenz) is a town in west-central Poland with 29,766 inhabitants. It is the seat of a mixed urban-rural commune called Gmina Swarzędz with 40,166 inhabitants. The town is situated in the Poznań metropolitan area, in the Greater Poland Voivodeship.

== General ==
The town lies directly on the route E92 and includes an aerosport facility run by the Poznań flying club, Wanda Modlibiowska. There are various companies based in the town, in particular carpentry and upholstering businesses. In addition a bicycle path from Poznań runs through the Dębiniec nature reserve and finally through the town to Pobiedziska.

== History ==
The etymology of Swarzędz is often taken as a proof for the area's importance in the pre-Christian Slavic cult of Svarog.

The documentary evidence for a settlement on the site of modern-day Swarzędz comes from 1366. In 1377 there is mention of a rectory in the settlement.

Due to its advantageous location on the route from Poznań to Masovia the town developed well. The settlement was formerly in private ownership. Originally the property of the Łodzia noble family, from the 15th century it passed to the Górka noble family of Łodzia coat of arms. In 1638 the town Grzymałowo, named after the Grzymała coat of arms of its founder, voivode of Kalisz Zygmunt Grudziński, was founded at the site of the village, however, it remained known under the old name Swarzędz. The town rights were confirmed by Polish King Władysław IV Vasa. Combined Łodzia and Grzymała coats of arms are the coat of arms of Swarzędz since. Administratively it was located in the Poznań Voivodeship in the Greater Poland Province. In the 17th century, guilds for tradesmen and craftsmen were formed.

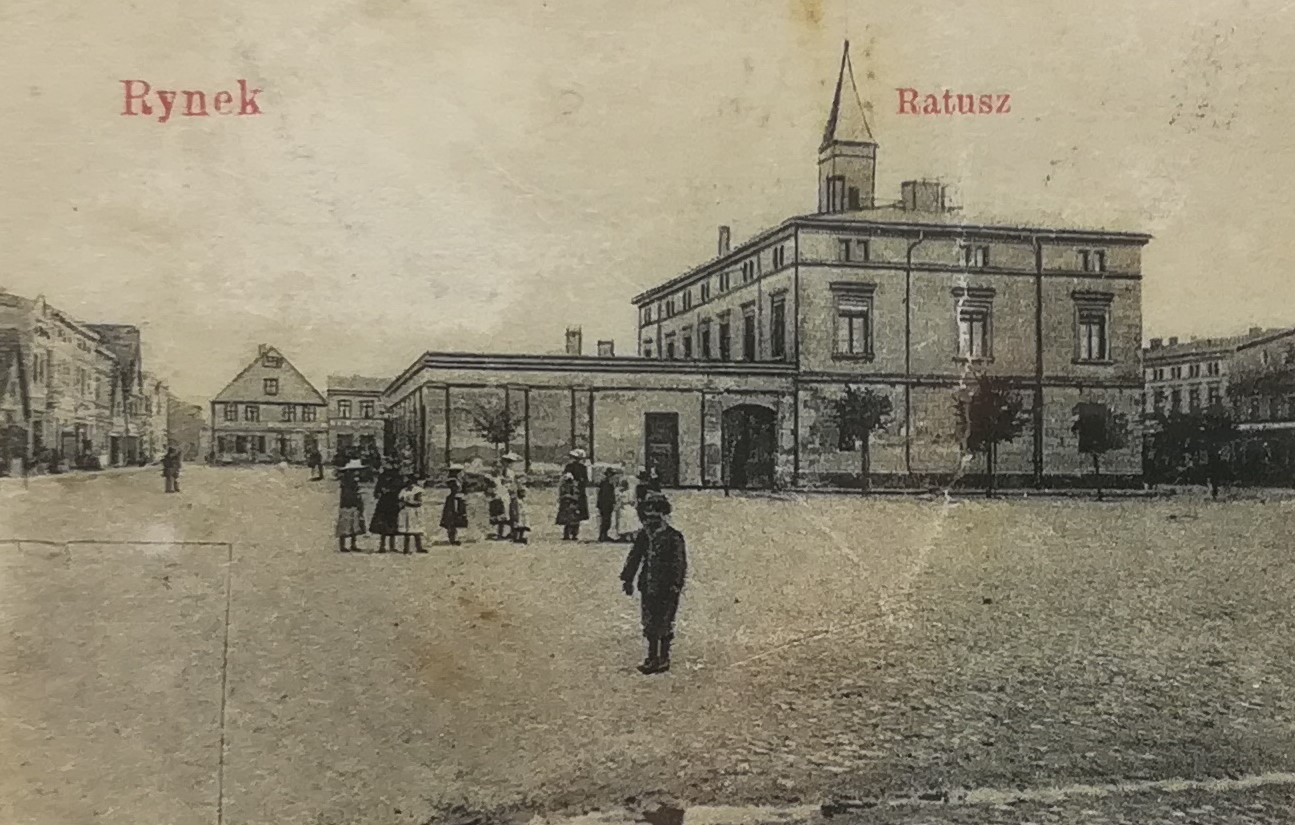
Early 20th-century view of the market square

In 1793 during the Second Partition of Poland the town of some 2,508 inhabitants was annexed by Prussia. In 1798, 448 craftsmen lived in the town. Of these, 70 were cloth makers and 36 weavers. After the successful Greater Poland uprising of 1806, it was regained by Poles and included within the short-lived Duchy of Warsaw. After the duchy's dissolution in 1815, it was re-annexed by Prussia. At the end of the 19th century carpentry flourished. In 1887 the town was connected to the railroad from Poznań to Września and thus received another important means of transport to other parts of the country, together with the road from Warsaw to Poznań. To resist Germanisation policies, the Polish population founded various organizations, including the "Sokół" Polish Gymnastic Society. In 1905 local Polish industrialist Antoni Tabaka founded a carpentry workshop. In 1906–1907 local Polish school children joined the strike against Germanisation, inspired by the Września children strike.

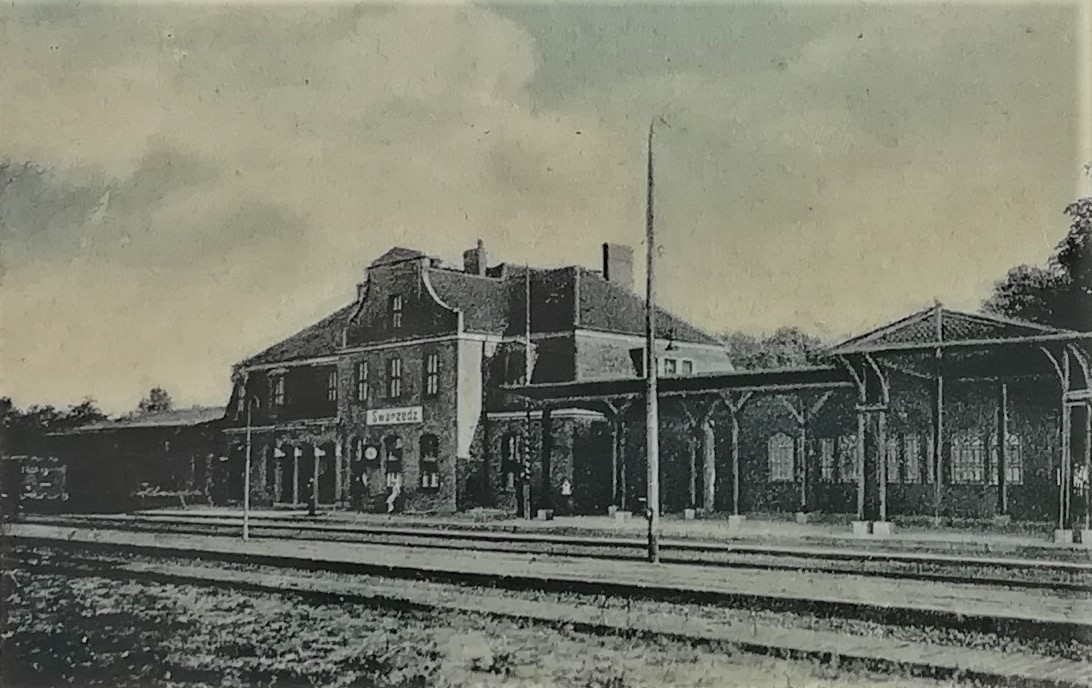
Swarzędz railway station in c. 1920

Poland regained independence after World War I on November 11, 1918, and two days later local Poles founded a Polish council under leadership of Tadeusz Staniewski, and began preparations to rejoin Poland. In January 1919, the first volunteers set out from Swarzędz to fight in the Greater Poland Uprising, the aim of which was to reunite the region with Poland. The town was soon successfully restored to Poland. In the interbellum the workshop of Antoni Tabaka grew into a large furniture factory, the first mechanized furniture factory in Poland, and its products enjoyed great popularity also abroad. In 1934 town limits were expanded.

During World War II, from 1939 to 1945, the town was under German occupation. Poles were subjected to expulsions, carried out in late 1939 and in 1940. The local furniture factory was seized by the occupiers and handed over to Germans, while its owner was expelled to Warsaw, and later also imprisoned in the Mauthausen concentration camp, where he died of exhaustion in 1945. Tadeusz Staniewski, mayor of Swarzędz, was imprisoned and tortured by the Germans in the infamous Fort VII in Poznań and afterwards deported to the Buchenwald concentration camp, where he was killed in August 1940. Stanisław Kwaśniewski, commander of the 1919 Swarzędz insurgent unit, was killed by the Germans in Fort VII. Four Poles who were either born or lived and worked in Swarzędz were murdered by the Russians in the Katyn massacre in 1940. From 1941 to 1943 a Nazi German forced labour camp for Jews was located in the town.

From 1975 to 1998, it was administratively located in the Poznań Voivodeship. In 1988 Swarzędz was awarded with the Commander's Cross of the Order of Polonia Restituta, one of Poland's highest state orders.

== Sights ==
- There is an open-air museum (the Professor Ryszard Kostecki museum) relating to beekeeping across Europe, one of the branches of the National Museum of Agriculture in Szreniawa.
- In the neighbouring town of Uzarzewo there is a park from the 19th century with a farmstead constructed between 1860 and 1865. There is a Hunting Museum there.
- In the village of Wierzenica there is a wooden church, St. Nikolaus, dating from the second half of the 16th century. At the church is the grave of August Cieszkowski (1814–1894). Near the village there is a graveyard with graves dating back to the Bronze Age.
- The church of St. Martin in Swarzędz (18th century).
- Church of the Archangel Michael in Uzarzewo.

== Transport ==
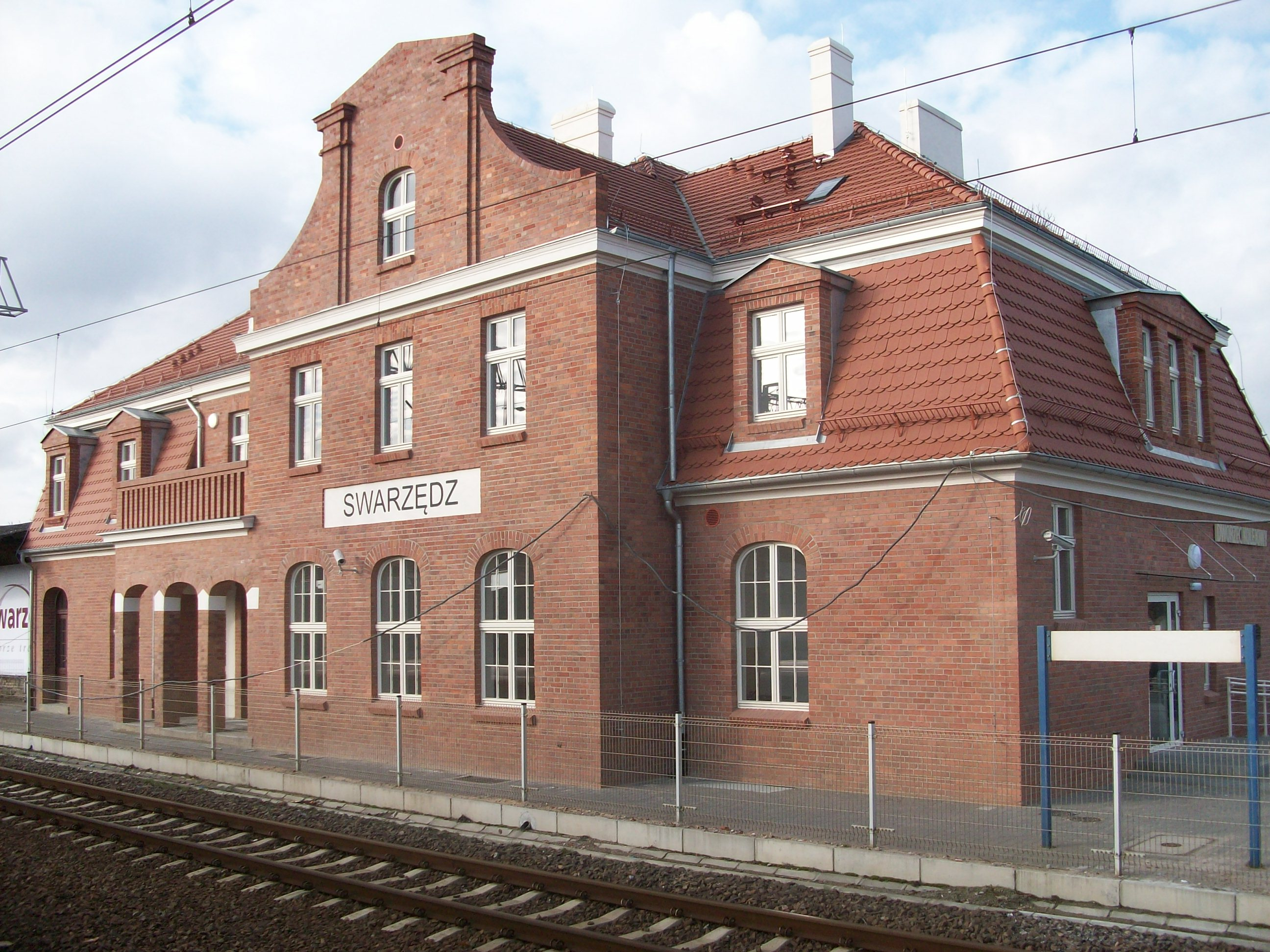
Swarzędz railway station

There is a railway station in Swarzędz. The town has railway connections with major Polish cities such as Poznań, Warsaw, Łódź and Szczecin.

== Sports ==
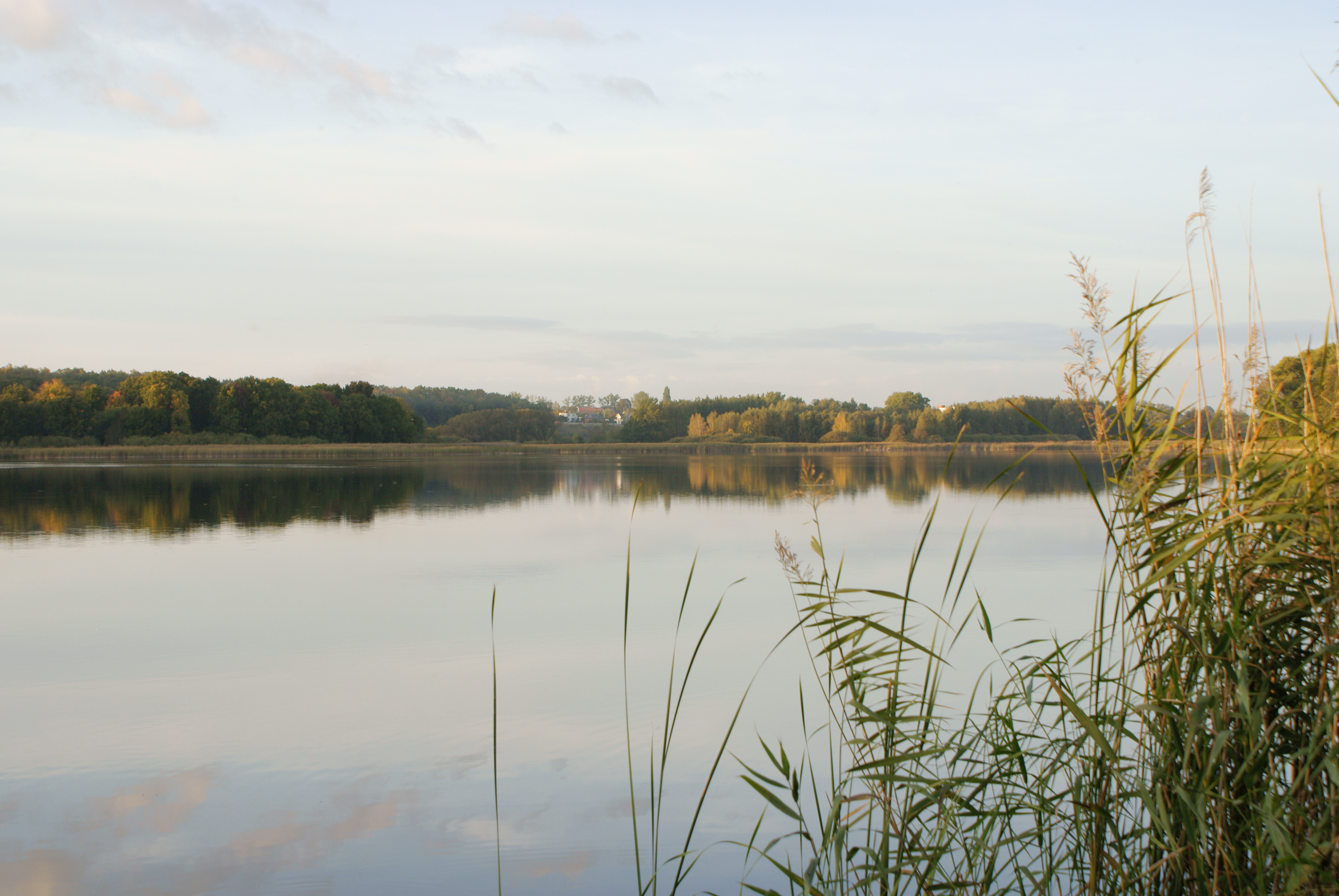
Swarzędz Lake

The local football club is Unia Swarzędz. It competes in the lower leagues.

== Notable residents ==
- Aleksander Doba (born 1946), Polish kayaker, 2014 Adventurer of the Year
- Andrzej Fischer (1952–2018), Polish footballer
- Erich Ludendorff (1865–1937), German general
- Paulina Wilkońska (1815–1875), Polish novelist
- Philipp Jaffé (1819–1870), German historian
- Robert Siewert (1887–1973), German politician
- Siegfried Placzek (1866–1946), American neurologist and psychiatrist
- Simon Baruch (1840–1921), American physician
- Zenon Baranowski (1930–1980), Polish Olympic athlete
- Antoni Tabaka (1881–1945), Polish industrialist
