= Peter Bray =

British kayaker (born 1957)

Peter Bray became, in 2001, the third person known to cross the Atlantic Ocean alone in a kayak (Franz Romer in 1928 and Hannes Lindemann in 1956 preceded him) as well as the first one to paddle west to east (i.e.: not riding favorable currents) and also the first one not using sails to help his paddling. He documented his expedition in the book Kayak Across the Atlantic in 2004.

== Early life ==
Bray is a Cornishman born in 1957. He was an outdoor pursuits instructor from Pencoed College in Bridgend.

== Kayaking across the Atlantic ==
He set out to cross the Atlantic Ocean in a kayak on June 23, 2001, from Newfoundland, Canada. After a 3,000-mile (4,800 km) 76-day journey, he arrived on the West Coast of Ireland on Wednesday, September 5, 2001. The former member of the British Army's Special Air Service Boat Troop was aiming to raise £100,000 for two children's hospices. Bray's first attempt to cross the Atlantic in a kayak ended in failure in 2000 after he capsized and he spent more than 30 hours adrift in waters of the North Atlantic. Jason Rice designed the special kayak which made the historic crossing.

In 2004, Bray was part of the four-man team on the Pink Lady, who together attempted the fastest crossing from St. John's, NF, Canada to Falmouth, England. Just 370 miles short of their destination, he again failed when the boat was broken in two by Hurricane Alex after 39 days at sea.

Bray is considered to have saved the life of crewmate Jonathan Gornall after the row boat was hit a Force 11 storm and split in two during the 1,800-mile row from Newfoundland, Canada, to Falmouth.

Gornall said: ”We knew that bad weather was coming and we had battened down and made ourselves as ready as possible. This included putting on our survival suits. It was so hot, however, in the rear cabin that I unzipped my suit and pulled the rubber neck seal over my head. Very, very stupid. After a wave struck I fought my way out of the wreckage only to realise that instead of floating I was sinking. Just then Pete appeared, ordered me not to panic and supported me in the water as I did my best to get the sea out of my suit. I have no doubt Pete saved my life. He then went on to retrieve our liferaft, in the extremely difficult circumstances, which at the very least contributed to, if not ensured, our survival.”

Julian Spicer OBE from the Royal Humane Society commented, “Pete’s bravery in the face of danger was outstanding and his medal is extremely well deserved.”

Bray made a successful circumnavigation of South Georgia Island in 2005, and is reportedly planning a crossing of the Bering Strait between Alaska and Russia.

On July 8, 2009, Bray once again left St. John's, Newfoundland at 10:25 a.m. (local time) to paddle solo and unsupported across the North Atlantic Ocean, aiming to arrive in the Isles of Scilly, United Kingdom in 64 days or less to break the current record. This attempt also ended in failure on 19 August 2009 (as a result of Hurricane Bill).

In 2011, Aleksander Doba broke Peter's record of 76 days of longest open-water crossing ever undertaken by a kayaker by paddling 99 days and 6 hours from Dakar in Africa to Brazil.

== Commendations and awards ==
In June 2005, Bray was awarded a bronze medal by the Royal Humane Society in recognition for his bravery in an Atlantic row.

Julian Spicer OBE from the Royal Humane Society commented, “Pete’s bravery in the face of danger was outstanding and his medal is extremely well deserved.”

Since 2017, Peter has been the Head of Training at the Plymouth based kayak hire company TK Watersports, as well as running his own company with his brother Clint, PB Adventures.
