= Zawady, Poznań =

Neighborhood of Poznań, Poland

Coordinates: 52.4176°N 16.9588°E

Zawady is a district of the city of Poznań in Poland, located in the northern part of Nowe Miasto.
