= Aleksander Doba =

Polish kayaker (1946–2021)

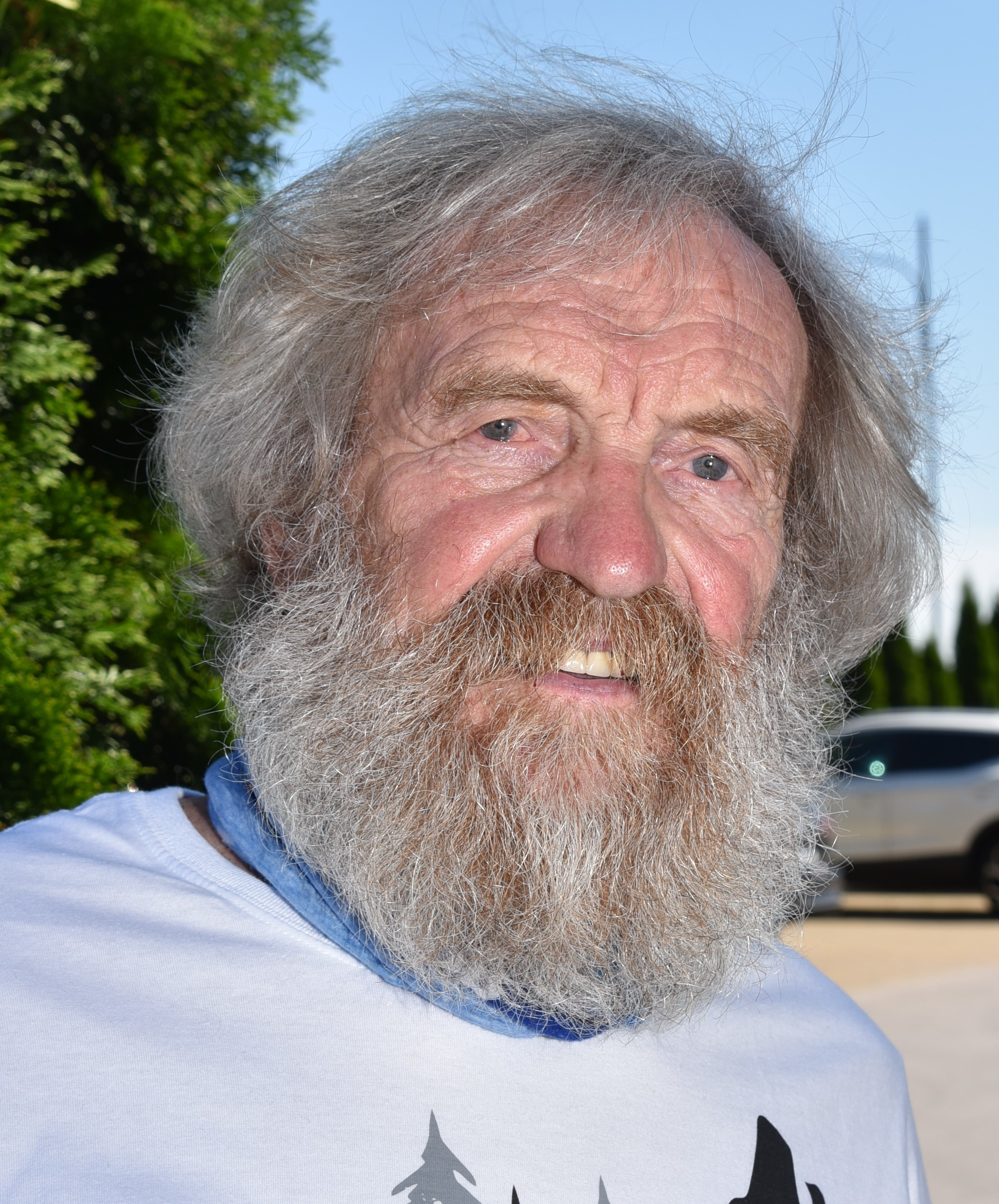
- Aleksander Doba in 2020
- Born: September 9, 1946; Swarzędz, Poland
- Died: February 22, 2021 (aged 74); Mount Kilimanjaro, Tanzania
- Education: Poznań University of Technology

Aleksander Doba (9 September 1946 – 22 February 2021) was a Polish kayaker known primarily for his long voyages crossing oceans. In 2010 and again in 2013 he kayaked across the Atlantic Ocean westward under his own power. The two voyages were the longest open-water kayak voyages ever made. He was named 2015 Adventurer of the Year by National Geographic. In 2017 he completed an eastward kayaking trip across the Atlantic. He died while climbing Kilimanjaro after reaching the mountain summit.

== Kayaking ==
Doba first tried kayaking at age 34 on a trip organised by the company he was working for. He quickly started going on kayaking expeditions regularly. He went on to win the gold medal at the Open Academic Polish Championships in Whitewater Kayaking in 2003 at age 57 and defended the title the next year.

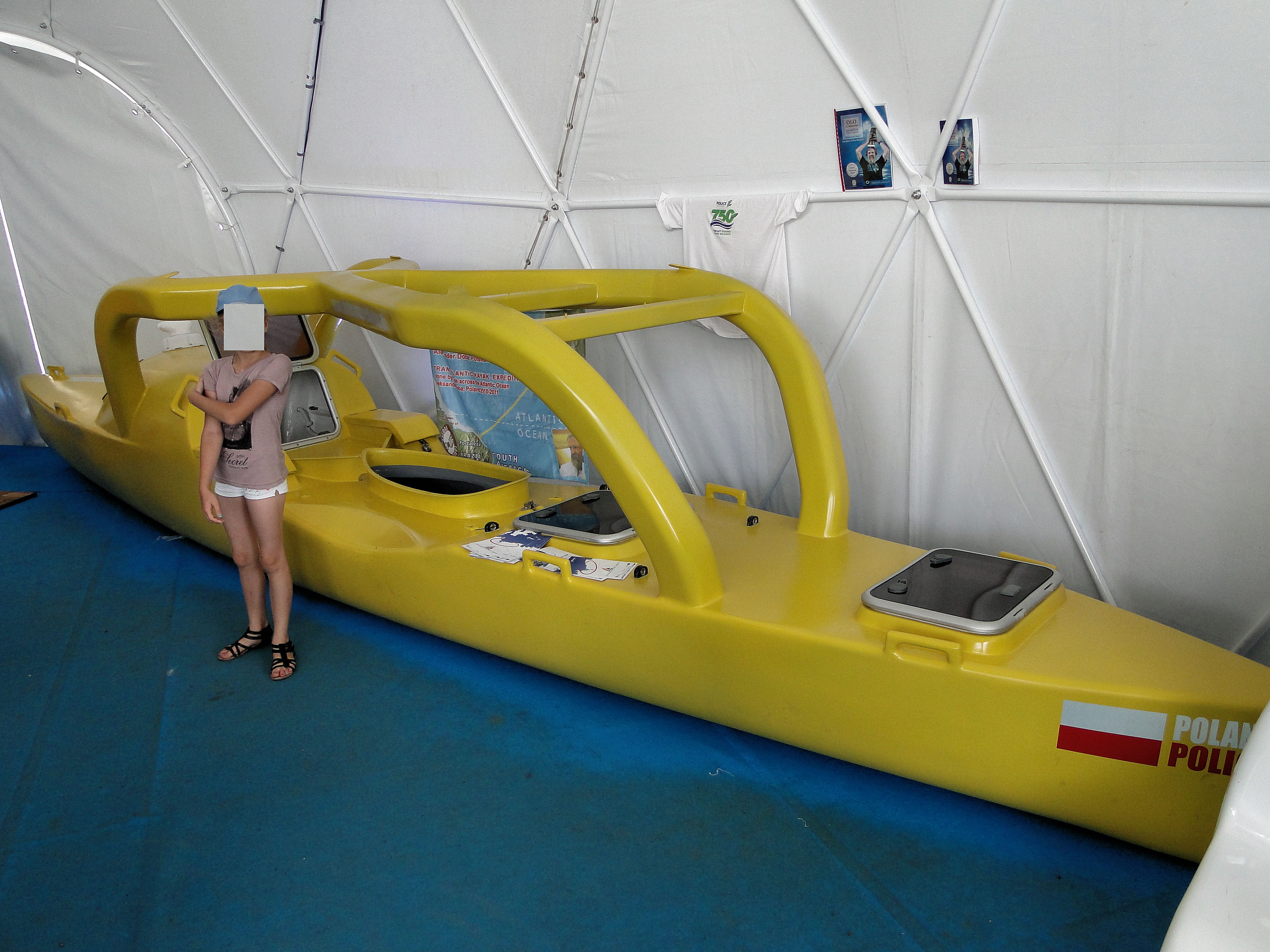
Sea kayak used by Doba for his 2010 Atlantic crossing

Doba's first voyage across the Atlantic Ocean was from Senegal to Brazil in 2010 and spanned 5,394 kilometres (3,352 mi). He was 65 years old when he undertook this journey. It was accomplished in a seven-metre (23 ft) sea kayak and set a record for the longest open-water crossing ever undertaken by a kayaker, at roughly 99 days (the previous longest kayak crossing belonged to Peter Bray who traveled from Newfoundland to Ireland in 2001 and took over 76 days, relying on muscle power only and no sail). While it was not the first transatlantic kayak crossing in history, Doba was the first one to travel this way from continent to continent and not island to island. Doba's journey started at 15:30 Polish time on 26 October 2010 in Dakar, Senegal, and ended when he reached Brazil, touching dry land at 10:12 local time for the first time in 98 days, 23 hours, and 42 min. He then reached Acaraú at 17:50 local time (99 days, 6 h, 20 min). His mean speed was 2.26 kilometres per hour (1.40 mph), and he averaged 54 kilometres (34 mi) per 24 hours, with a maximum 24‑hour distance of 126.5 kilometres (78.6 mi). When he arrived in Brazil he weighed 64 kilograms (141 lb), having lost 14 kilograms (31 lb) in 14 weeks of the journey.

After resting there, he initially planned to paddle another 6,000 kilometres (3,700 mi) north along the shorelines of the Americas to Washington, D.C. However, he eventually decided to transport his transatlantic kayak to Peru instead and embarked on a journey down the Amazon River but after being attacked and robbed twice in Brazil he had to quit.

On October 5, 2013, at age 67, he departed from Lisbon (Portugal) for a second transatlantic voyage, with the intention of paddling 8,690 kilometres (5,400 mi) across the Atlantic's widest point. He arrived at New Smyrna Beach, Florida on April 19, 2014. The voyage took him 196 days to complete, and he paddled 10,140 kilometres (6,300 mi).

On September 3, 2017, Doba completed his third solo transatlantic kayak trip when he kayaked into a port in Le Conquet, France from Barnegat Bay, New Jersey in May 2017. He was at sea for 110 consecutive days. He used a 23-foot (7.0 m) kayak, weighing 1,500 pounds (680 kg) when fully loaded. During the trip, he struggled against storms; his rudder was damaged and had to be repaired by sailors from a merchant vessel.

Doba has also paddled in a kayak with others around the Baltic Sea (in 1999, 80 days, 4,227 kilometres (2,627 mi)), from Police to Narvik (in 2000, 101 days, 5,369 kilometres (3,336 mi)) and around Lake Baikal (in 2009, 41 days, 2,000 kilometres (1,200 mi)). He has also jumped 14 times with parachute, piloted gliders for a total of 250 hours, and practiced cycling. He held a marine yacht skipper certificate.

== Personal life ==
Aleksander Doba was born on September 9, 1946 in Swarzędz, near Poznań, Greater Poland Voivodeship, Poland and lived in Police near Szczecin, West Pomeranian Voivodeship. He studied mechanical engineering at Poznan University of Technology and worked in a chemical factory most of his life. With his wife Gabriela he had two sons: Bartłomiej and Czesław.

Doba was awarded the Gold The Honorary Badge of the West Pomeranian Griffin on 19 June 2012, Knight's Cross of the Order of Polonia Restituta on 16 February 2015, the Medal of the Centenary of Regained Independence in 2018 and the Officer's Cross of the Order of Polonia Restituta posthumously on 8 March 2021.

Doba died while climbing Kilimanjaro on February 22, 2021. According to eyewitness reports he felt well the entire journey but after reaching the top asked for a two-minute break before posing for a photo. He then sat down on a rock and "just fell asleep".

== Media appearances ==
Several books have been written about his adventures, including three written by Doba himself. There is a song by Manchester band Arkayla about him.
