= Andrzej Fischer =

Polish footballer (1952–2018)

Personal information
- Full name: Andrzej Lucjan Fischer
- Date of birth: 15 January 1952
- Place of birth: Swarzędz, Poland
- Date of death: 22 November 2018 (aged 66)
- Place of death: Hildesheim, Germany
- Height: 1.85 m (6 ft 1 in)
- Position: Goalkeeper

Youth career
- 1966–1968: Unia Swarzędz

Senior career*
Years	Team	Apps	(Gls)
1968–1971	Olimpia Poznań		
1971–1973	Lech Poznań	34	(0)
1973–1979	Górnik Zabrze	86	(0)
1979–1983	GKS Żory		
1983–1984	Bochum Höveln		
1984–1985	VfR Aalen		

International career
1974	Poland	2	(0)
Medal record
Men's football
Representing Poland
FIFA World Cup
Third place	1974 West Germany
- * Club domestic league appearances and goals

Andrzej Lucjan Fischer (15 January 1952 – 22 November 2018) was a Polish footballer who played as a goalkeeper.

Among the clubs he played for were Lech Poznań and Górnik Zabrze. He earned two caps for the Poland national team, and was a reserve goalkeeper in the 1974 FIFA World Cup, where Poland finished third.

== Honours ==
Poland

- FIFA World Cup third place: 1974
