= Zygmunt Grudziński (1568–1653) =

Polish noble

Zygmunt Grudziński (1568 or 1572 – 1653) was a Polish noble (szlachcic) of Grzymała coat of arms. He held the titles of castellan of Nakło (from 1615), Biechów (from 1616), Międzyrzecz, Międzyrzecze (from 1618) and Inowrocław (from 1621), as well voivode of Inowrocław (from 1621 to 1628) and later voivode of Kalisz (from 1628 to 1652).

In 1613 he was a deputy to Sejm from the Kalisz sejmik.

He dedicated himself to improving the wealth of both his own family and his voivodeship. He was known to be a shrewd investor, something not common among the szlachta, who tended to look down upon merchants and people dealing with non-agricultural trade.

He inherited only 10 villages after his father, but near the end of his life he was the owner of 114 villages, 6 towns and partial owner of another 21 villages and 3 towns. A member of Czech Brethren, he converted to Roman Catholicism near the end of his life, and in order to attract settlers to his lands he was a strong believer in religious tolerance. This is visible on the example of the town he founded, Swarzędz (early known as 'Grzymałowo'). In 1621 he invited Jews from large city of Poznań to the village of Swarzedz, guaranteeing them many religious freedoms, and sponsored the construction of 32 houses in the city for various craftsman. In 1638 he issued another set of guarantees, this time for Protestant settlers, invited Germans, and it was also the time that Swarzędz received city rights. Two years later the new town already had a wooden city hall. Early industries of the city, supported by Zygmunt, included a brewery, cloth manufacture, gunsmiths (bractwo kurkowe) and shoemakers' guilds, the latter received its own statue in 1644. By that time the town has already become one of the most important cloth producers in Wielkopolska region of the Commonwealth.

He built a large manor in Poddębice, that can be described as a palace in the late-Renaissance style. But he burned it to the ground after his wife died in a tragic horse related accident.

He was married to Anna Opalińska. Their daughter, Izabela, married Michal Działyński, the voivode of Brześć Kujawski.
