= Paczkowo, Greater Poland Voivodeship =

Paczkowo
- Village
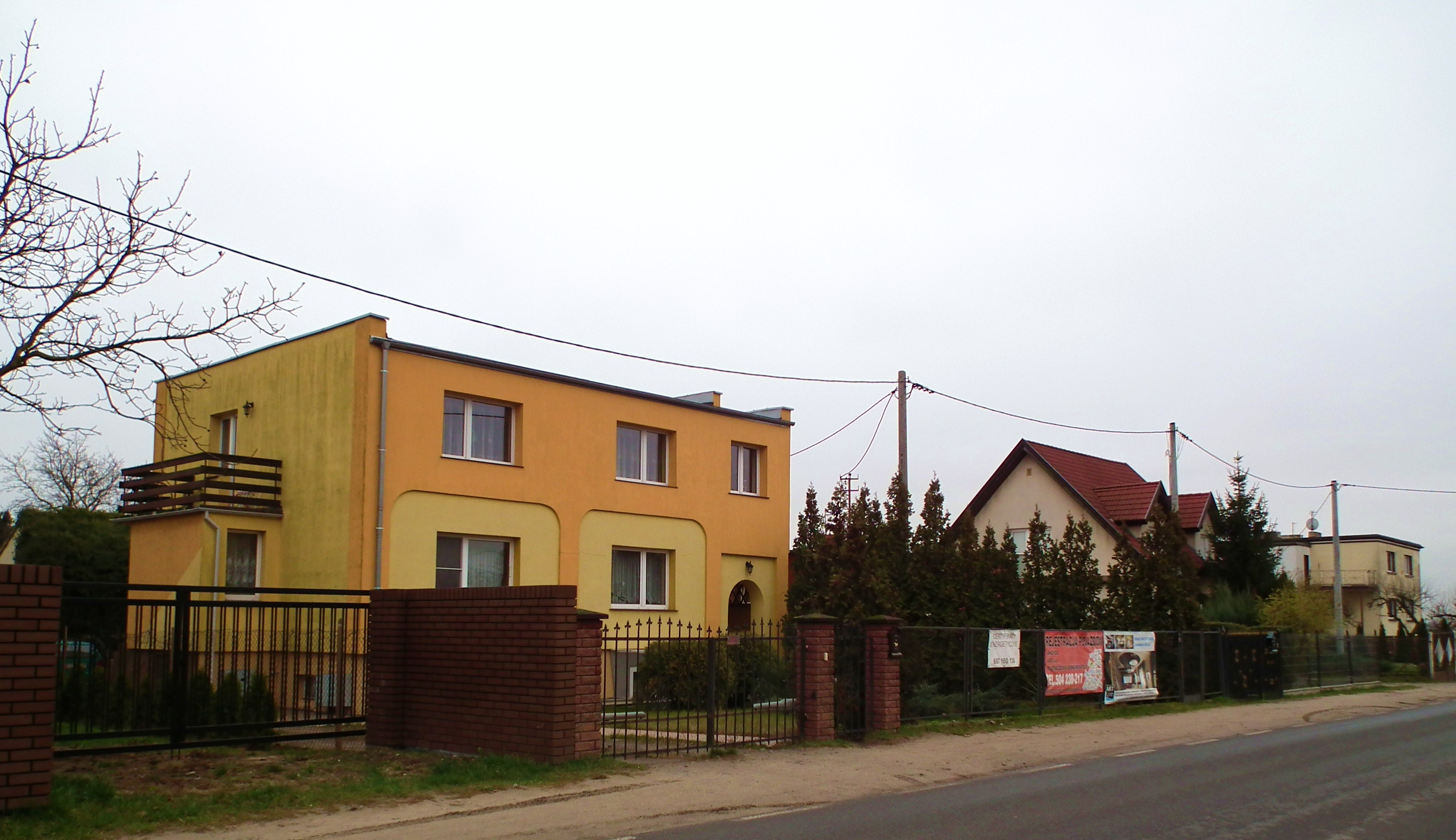

- Location within Poland
- Coordinates: 52°24′N 17°9′E
- Country: Poland
- Voivodeship: Greater Poland
- County: Poznań
- Gmina: Swarzędz
- Population: 1,251

Paczkowo [pat͡ʂˈkɔvɔ] is a village in the administrative district of Gmina Swarzędz, within Poznań County, Greater Poland Voivodeship, in west-central Poland.
