= Katarzynki, Greater Poland Voivodeship =

Katarzynki
- Village
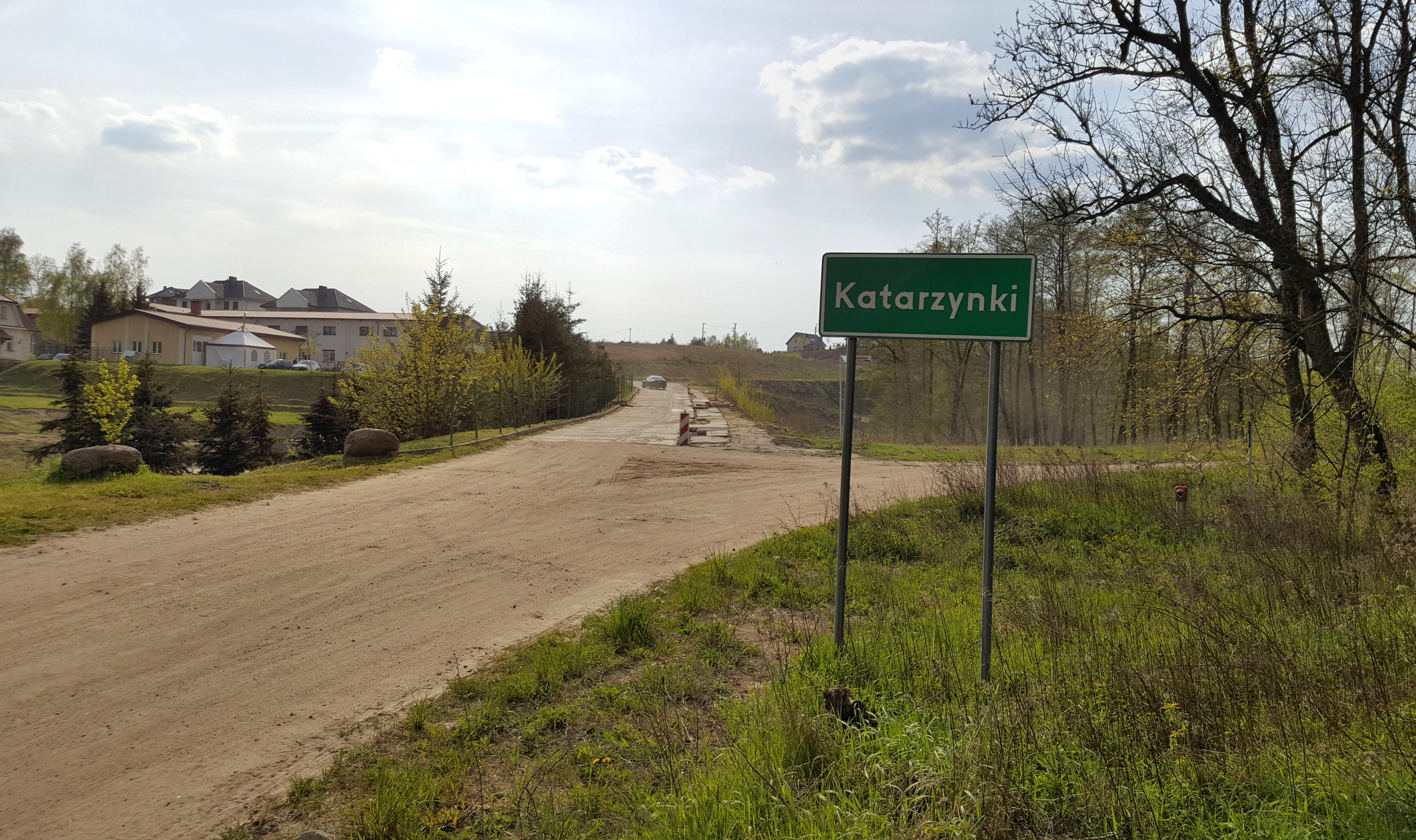

- Location within Poland
- Coordinates: 52°26′52″N 17°06′50″E
- Country: Poland
- Voivodeship: Greater Poland
- County: Poznań
- Gmina: Swarzędz

Katarzynki [kataˈʐɨnki] is a village in the administrative district of Gmina Swarzędz, within Poznań County, Greater Poland Voivodeship, in west-central Poland.
