= Wierzenica =

- Village
- Location within Poland
- Coordinates: 52°27′42″N 17°4′5″E
- Country: Poland
- Voivodeship: Greater Poland
- County: Poznań
- Gmina: Swarzędz
- Population: 261

Wierzenica [vjɛʐɛˈnit͡sa] is a village in the administrative district of Gmina Swarzędz, within Poznań County, Greater Poland Voivodeship, in west-central Poland.

The village has a church which lies on the Wooden Churches Trail around Puszcza Zielonka.
