= Garby, Poznań County =

Garby
- Village
- Location within Poland
- Coordinates: 52°22′30″N 17°4′15″E
- Country: Poland
- Voivodeship: Greater Poland
- County: Poznań
- Gmina: Swarzędz
- Population: 290

Garby [ˈɡarbɨ] is a village in the administrative district of Gmina Swarzędz, within Poznań County, Greater Poland Voivodeship, in west-central Poland.
