= Święcinek =

- Settlement
- Location within Poland
- Coordinates: 52°26′18″N 17°08′41″E
- Country: Poland
- Voivodeship: Greater Poland
- County: Poznań
- Gmina: Swarzędz

Święcinek (Polish: [ɕfjɛɲˈt͡ɕinɛk]) is a settlement in the administrative district of Gmina Swarzędz, within Poznań County, Greater Poland Voivodeship, in west-central Poland.
