= Puszczykowo-Zaborze =

- Village
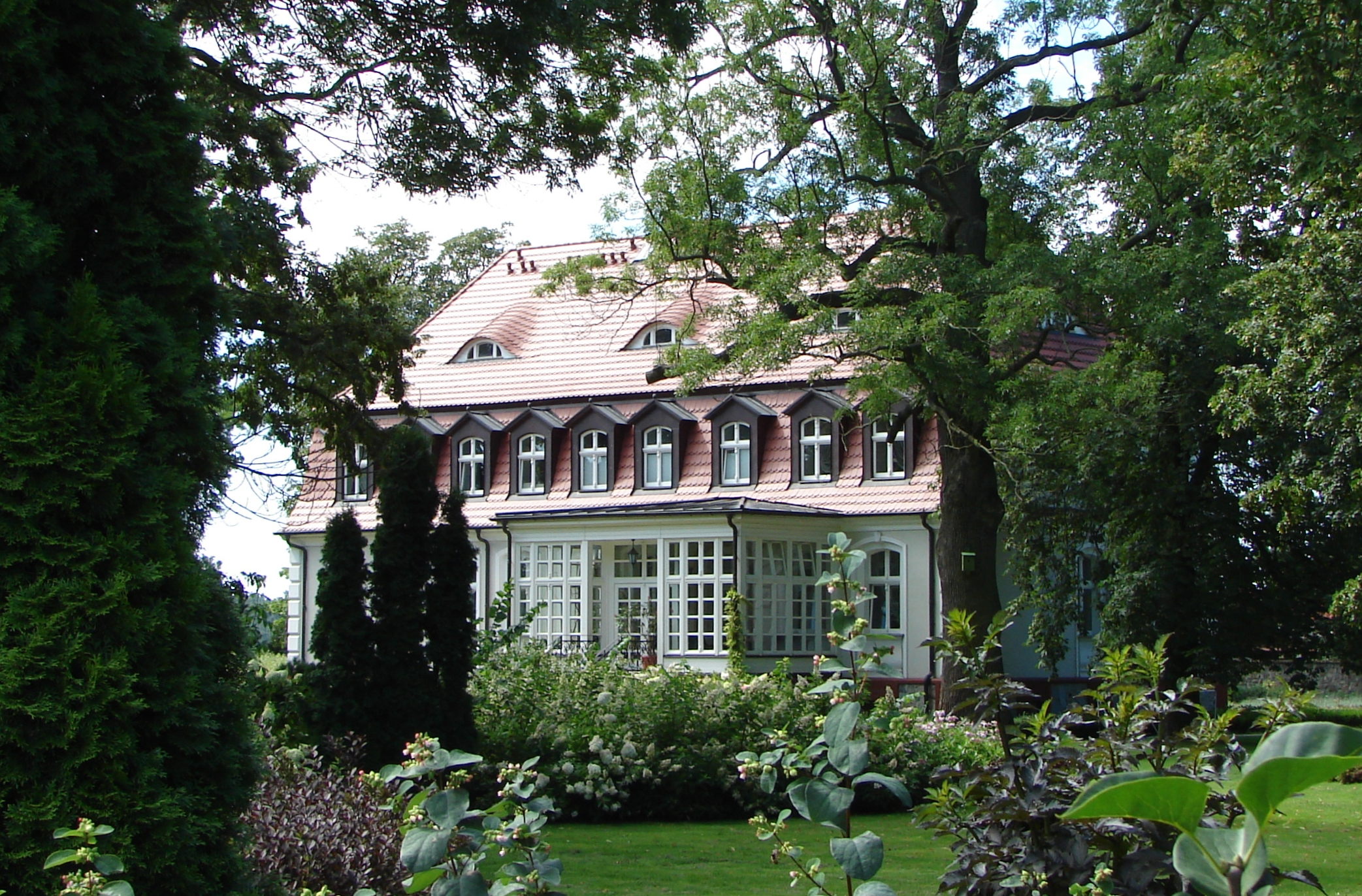
- The manor house.

- Location within Poland
- Coordinates: 52°25′48″N 17°11′34″E
- Country: Poland
- Voivodeship: Greater Poland
- County: Poznań
- Gmina: Swarzędz
- Population: 24

Puszczykowo-Zaborze [puʂt͡ʂɨˈkɔvɔ zaˈbɔʐɛ] is a village in the administrative district of Gmina Swarzędz, within Poznań County, Greater Poland Voivodeship, in west-central Poland.
