= National Museum of Agriculture in Szreniawa =

Coordinates: 52°18′58″N 16°47′52″E

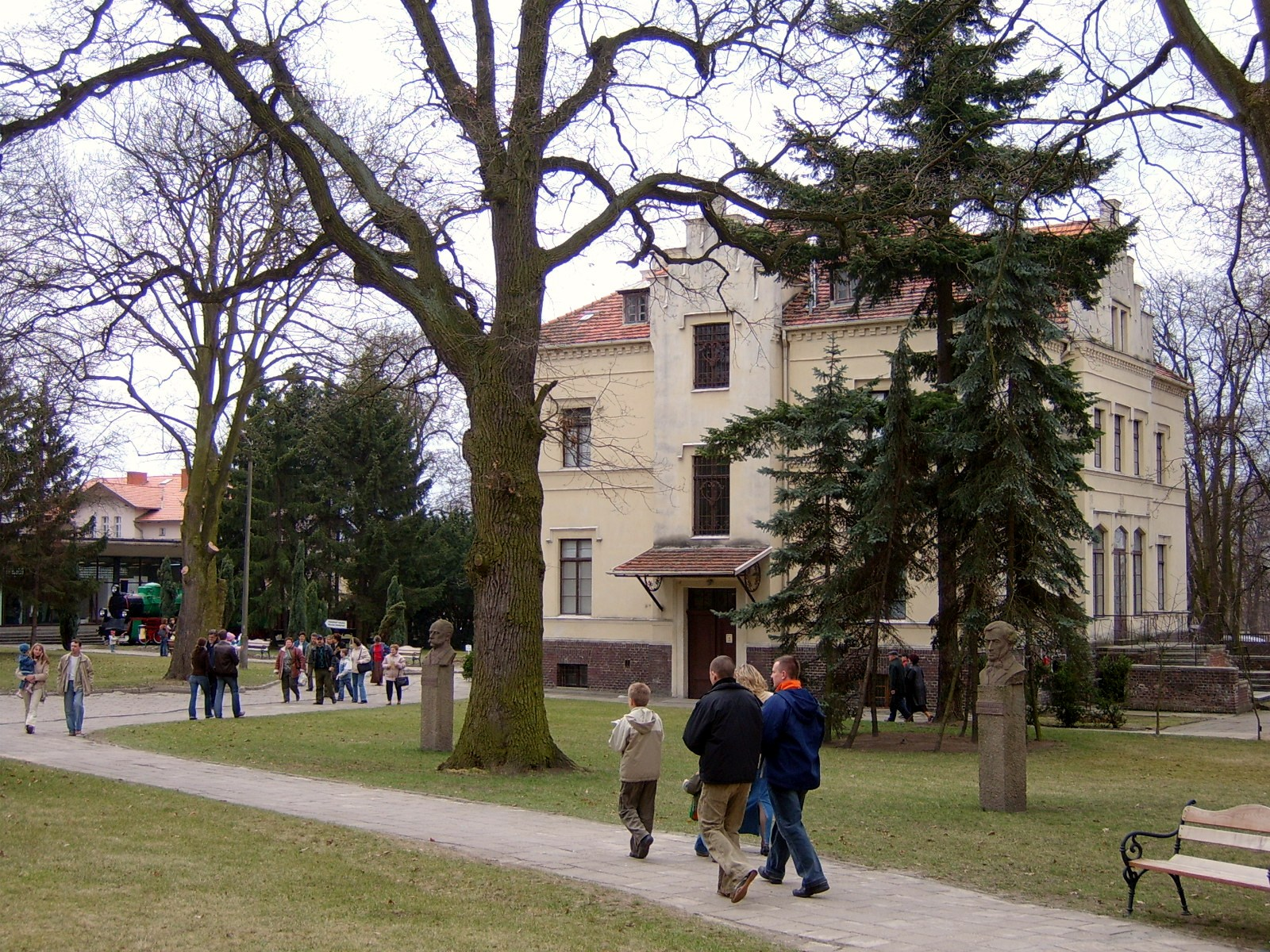
Palace, built 1853

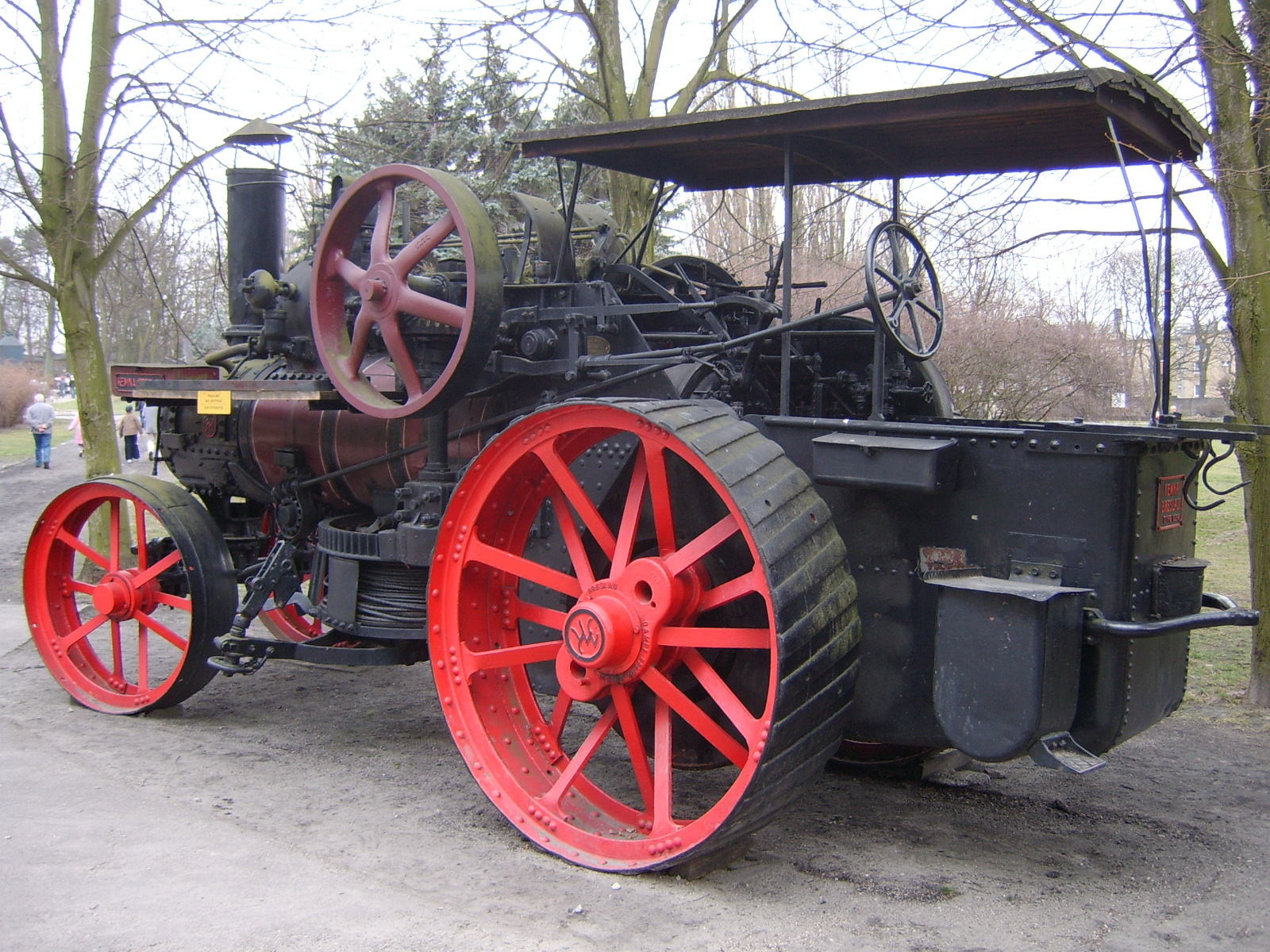
Kemna-Breslau traction engine, 1927

The National Museum of Agriculture in Szreniawa (Polish: Muzeum Narodowe Rolnictwa i Przemysłu Rolno-Spożywczego w Szreniawie, full name: National Museum of Agriculture and Agricultural-Food Industry in Szreniawa) is a museum whose main site is in the village of Szreniawa, south of Poznań in western Poland. It was founded in 1964, and gained the status of National Museum in 1975. It has many open-air exhibits, including examples of agricultural tools and machinery, beehives, and other historical objects.

Apart from its central site at Szreniawa, the museum also incorporates five branches: the Museum of Milling and Water Equipment at Jaracz, the Museum of Natural Environment and Hunting at Uzarzewo, the Museum of Bee-keeping in Swarzędz, the Museum of Basketry and Hop Growing in Nowy Tomyśl, and the Museum of Meat Production in Sielinko.
