= Siegfried Placzek =

German-American neurologist and psychiatrist

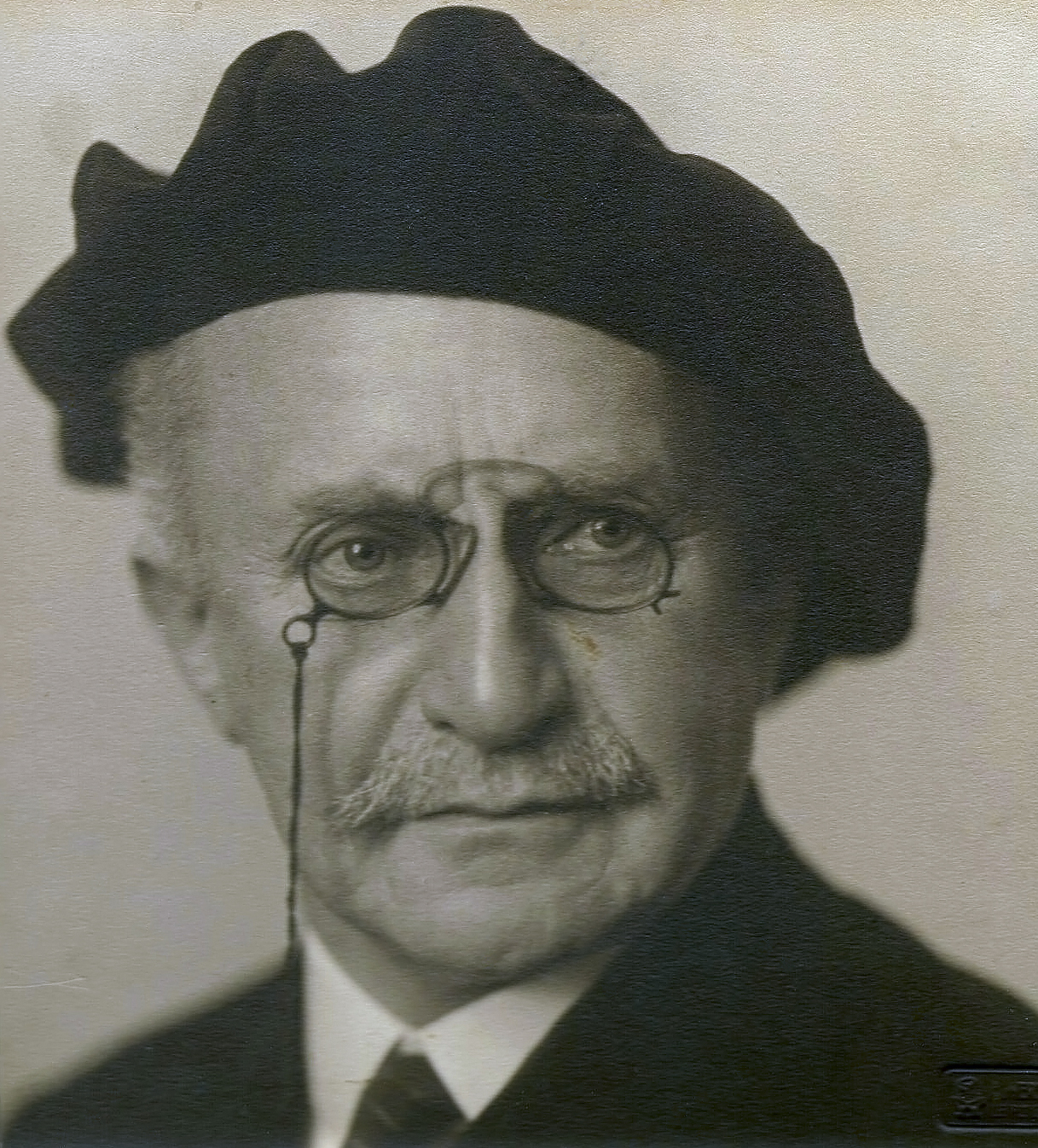
Siegfried Placzek

Siegfried Placzek (1866, Schwersenz, Kingdom of Prussia – March 8, 1946, New York City, New York, USA) was a prominent German-born neurologist and psychiatrist.

== Biography ==
Born in Schwersenz, Kingdom of Prussia, Siegfried Placzek studied medicine at the universities of Berlin, Kiel, Leipzig and Jena. He traveled to America in 1893 on a study tour, publishing his findings in a book, Medical Science in the United States, published in 1893. In 1892, he settled down in Berlin as a neurologist. He married Elise Hirschwald, a concert pianist and accompanist, in 1899. The couple had two children, Dr. Henry Platt (AKA Heinz Placzek) of New York, NY, (1903–1955) and Dr. Gerda Haupt (1901–1989). Siegfried Placzek and Elise Hirschwald were divorced in 1915. In 1901, he left Judaism and was evangelically baptized in the Jerusalem Church in Berlin.

== Career ==
According to his New York Times obituary, Placzek was "recognized as a keen diagnostician and as the leading opponent of extremes in psychoanalysis." Dr. Placzek was also an authority on hypnotism and occultism. As a pioneer in the study of effects of air travel and high altitudes, he made many balloon ascents around the turn of the 20th century to study the effects of high altitudes on human psychological behavior. For many years, he was employed as a neurological expert by the German railway systems and did considerable work as a medical expert in criminal trials.

Placzek studied in Leipzig, Berlin, Kiel and Jena, and served as an assistant to Hermann Oppenheim, receiving his doctorate in 1889. He began working as a neurologist in Berlin in 1892 and was the head physician of the Rassow Institute for Retarded Children starting in 1898. Pagel: Biographical Encyclopedia of Outstanding Doctors of the Nineteenth Century, Berlin, Vienna, col 1303, Permalink:http://www.zeno.org/nid/20008027749 License: Public domain Facsimiles: 1303

Medical confidentiality and ethics became an issue of considerable medical and political debate in Germany, as well as in England, in the early 20th century. One issue concerned that of abortion. Albert Moll, an important figure in the burgeoning fields of sexology, neurology and psychology, argued that abortion should not be considered as a crime. Placzek and Moll both advised not to denounce a woman in lawsuits concerning abortion who had had one, if the abortion had already taken place. He also considered it justifiable to denounce someone who had made a request for an abortion or to report the abortionist if the woman died as a result. However, Placzek agreed with the conservative view that the person who had made the request for an abortion should be reported to the authorities and was not protected by medical confidentiality. It was generally viewed as appropriate to report the abortionist, with the aim of preventing abortions. 3.

An additional example of Placzek’s conservative viewpoint concerned the issue of homosexuality. In his Homosexualität und Recht (Homosexuality and Law) he wrote, “the male homosexual has a predilection for youths, indeed, for lads” and described how the homosexual man “lacks a strong sense of honour” and strength of will” and that such men “happily use the feminine weapons of intrigue, hypocrisy, and lying” and “have passion for gossip.” 7.

Placzek served as director of the Hasenheide clinic in Berlin’s Neukölln district and then at the Waldanatorium in Neubabelsberg, on the outskirt of Berlin. (Dates?) His move triggered competition between the two clinics when his former employer wrote to the Reich Insurance Office to request that accident neurotics be sent there for treatment. Placzek subsequently wrote to inform the office of his new clinic, describing as preferable because of its distance “from the noisy hustle and bustle” of downtown Berlin.

For many years Placzek was employed as a neurological expert by the German railway systems and did considerable work as a medical expert in criminal trials.[3]Beginning as an assistant at Charité Universitätsmedizin, Berlin, Placzek became an expert examiner for the Imperial Railway. At a congress held in Berlin in 1908, he spoke of the “terrible increase” of accident neuroses among railway employees and called upon doctors to fight the “widespread belief among nerve invalids” that they had a “privileged right” to a pension. 7. Killen Andreas, Berlin Electropolis.. Regarding the relationship between accident and neuroses among railway employees, he stated that “temporal succession is no proof of causal connection.” He also claimed that existing procedures for examining employees were obsolete, and along with others at the congress, agreed that these methods lead to too many false positives. He also agreed that the burden of the “competing requirements of these methods” combined with the endless claims for payment on psychological grounds from the railway companies in compensation were amounting to a “principal of entitlement for all the injurious experiences of modern life.” He warned of offices that existed in Berlin to inform individuals on how to conduct themselves to get the best results in their claims for compensation. To combat these problems, Placzek favored using intelligence tests currently being used by Theodor Ziehen, Director of the Neurological Clinic of the Charité. He argued that the incidence of mental illness among railway personnel was “shockingly high”, but that in many cases it reflected the presence of a pre-existing condition. Killen, Andraes Berlin Electropolis, p. 98, 111

In Placzek’s most successful book, “Friendship and Sexuality” he speaks out against Freudian psychoanalysis, calling it “an overzealous, one-sided direction of research”, against whose “belittling” and “dissection technique” one must “most emphatically object.” Apparently, the feeling was mutual from Freud’s viewpoint. In a letter to a friend, Karl Abraham, Freud writes, “Today I have heard from Berlin an idiotic essay by Placzek on Friendship and a piece of prattle by Eulenberg.” (Letters from Sigmund Freud to Karl Abraham, Sept. 26, 1916. From Wikipedia. In spite of Placzek’s many differing viewpoints with Freud’s work, and concerning particularly with his method of analytic treatment, Placzek published a highly complementary review of Freud’s work, expressing the feeling that it was essential for all physicians to become familiar with his work and that there was much to be learned from it. (Kiell, Norman, Freud Without Hindsight: Review of His Work, 1895-1939. Madison, CT:International Universities Press,1988), 44-46

In 1939, upon retiring, Placzek moved to America to escape Nazi persecution where he devoted much of his time to studying and lecturing. He is the author of numerous books on human sexuality, achieving a wide reputation in the field as the author of The Sex Life of Man, a textbook for the medical and legal professions. His other published works span a quarter of a century, including a number of treatises on work in his field, all published in German. He is also the author of studies on accident neurosis and a volume dealing with the physician’s obligation to professional secrecy.

== Publications ==
Two cyclists, stereotype in: Auf dem Rade : Eindrücke und Erfahrungen gesammelt auf Wanderfahrten durch den Schwarzwald, Ober-Bayern, Schweiz, Tirol, Ober-Italien, by Siegfried Placzek, 1897 (Helveticat: nbdig-727101).

His published works include the following:

- Die medicinische Wissenschaft in den Vereinigten Staaten, 1894.
- Auf dem Rade : Eindrücke und Erfahrungen gesammelt auf Wanderfahrten durch den Schwarzwald, Ober-Bayern, Schweiz, Tirol, Ober-Italien, 1897.
- Selbstmordverdacht und Selbstmordvermutung: eine Anleitung zur Propylaxe fur Aerzte, Geistliche, Lehrer und Verwaltungsbeamte, 1915.
- Freundschaft und Sexualitat Dritte, wider vermehrte Auflage. Berlin, Marcus & Websterm 1917.
- Kunstliche Fehlgeburt und kunstliche Unfruchtbarkeit: ihre Indikationen, Technik un Rechtslage; ein Handbuch, von Prof. Dr. C. Adam, Hrsg. Von Dr. Med. Placzek., 1918.
- Das Geschlechtsleben der Hysterischen. Eine medizinisch, soziologische und forensische Stude. Bonn, Marcus & Weber, 1919.
- Homosexualitat und Recht, 1925.
- Erotik und Schaffen. Berlin und Koln, Marcus & Weber, 1934.
- The Sexual Life of Man, An Outline for Students, Doctors and Lawyer.JohnBale, Sons & Danielsson, Ltd., Oxford house, 83-91, Great Titchfield Street, W.I, 1923.
