= Jasin, Greater Poland Voivodeship =

Jasin
- Village
- Location within Poland
- Coordinates: 52°24′N 17°6′E
- Country: Poland
- Voivodeship: Greater Poland
- County: Poznań
- Gmina: Swarzędz
- Population: 994

Jasin [ˈjaɕin] is a village in the administrative district of Gmina Swarzędz, within Poznań County, Greater Poland Voivodeship, in west-central Poland.
