= Bogucin, Greater Poland Voivodeship =

Bogucin
- Village
- Location within Poland
- Coordinates: 52°26′N 17°1′E
- Country: Poland
- Voivodeship: Greater Poland
- County: Poznań
- Gmina: Swarzędz
- Population: 1,012

Bogucin [bɔˈɡut͡ɕin] is a village in the administrative district of Gmina Swarzędz, within Poznań County, Greater Poland Voivodeship, in west-central Poland.
