= Gruszczyn, Greater Poland Voivodeship =

Gruszczyn
- Village
- Location within Poland
- Coordinates: 52°25′47″N 17°4′17″E
- Country: Poland
- Voivodeship: Greater Poland
- County: Poznań
- Gmina: Swarzędz
- Population: 1,224

Gruszczyn [ˈɡruʂt͡ʂɨn] is a village in the administrative district of Gmina Swarzędz, within Poznań County, Greater Poland Voivodeship, in west-central Poland.
