= Sarbinowo, Poznań County =

Sarbinowo
- Village
- Location within Poland
- Coordinates: 52°26′N 17°10′E
- Country: Poland
- Voivodeship: Greater Poland
- County: Poznań
- Gmina: Swarzędz
- Population: 141

Sarbinowo [sarbiˈnɔvɔ] is a village in the administrative district of Gmina Swarzędz, within Poznań County, Greater Poland Voivodeship, in west-central Poland.
