= Gmina Swarzędz =

Gmina Swarzędz Swarzędz Commune
- Gmina
- Flag Coat of arms
- Interactive map of Gmina Swarzędz
- Coordinates (Swarzędz): 52°24′30″N 17°4′17″E
- Country: Poland
- Voivodeship: Greater Poland
- County: Poznań County
- Seat: Swarzędz

Area
  - Total: 101.99 km^{2} (39.38 sq mi)

Population (2006)
  - Total: 40,499
  - Density: 397.09/km^{2} (1,028.5/sq mi)
  - Urban: 29,894
  - Rural: 10,605
- Website: http://www.swarzedz.pl

Gmina Swarzędz is an urban-rural gmina (administrative district) in Poznań County, Greater Poland Voivodeship, in west-central Poland. Its seat is the town of Swarzędz, which lies approximately 11 kilometres (7 mi) east of the regional capital Poznań.

The gmina covers an area of 101.99 square kilometres (39.4 sq mi), and as of 2006 its total population is 40,499 (out of which the population of Swarzędz amounts to 29,894, and the population of the rural part of the gmina is 10,605).

== Villages ==
Apart from the town of Swarzędz, Gmina Swarzędz contains the villages and settlements of Bogucin, Garby, Gortatowo, Gruszczyn, Janikowo, Jasin, Karłowice, Katarzynki, Kobylnica, Kruszewnia, Ligowiec, Łowęcin, Mechowo, Paczkowo, Puszczykowo-Zaborze, Rabowice, Sarbinowo, Sokolniki Gwiazdowskie, Święcinek, Uzarzewo, Wierzenica, Wierzonka and Zalasewo.

== Neighbouring gminas ==
Gmina Swarzędz is bordered by the city of Poznań and by the gminas of Czerwonak, Kleszczewo, Kostrzyn and Pobiedziska.
