= Uzarzewo =

- Village
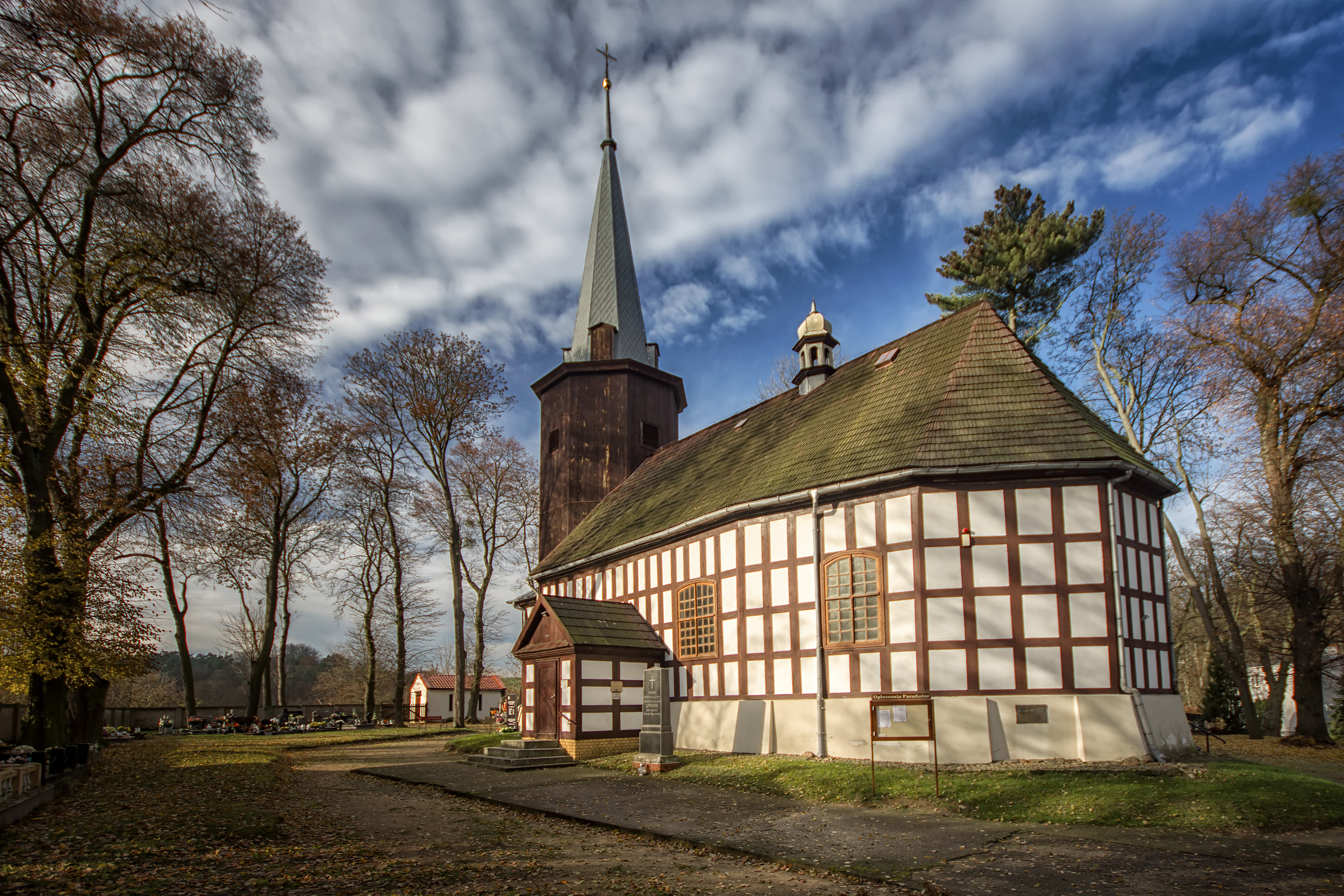
- Parish church of St. Michael, built in 1749.

- Location within Poland
- Coordinates: 52°27′9″N 17°7′33″E
- Country: Poland
- Voivodeship: Greater Poland
- County: Poznań
- Gmina: Swarzędz
- Population: 580

Uzarzewo [uzaˈʐɛvɔ] is a village in the administrative district of Gmina Swarzędz, within Poznań County, Greater Poland Voivodeship, in west-central Poland.

The village is the site of a Museum of Natural Environment and Hunting, under the auspices of the National Museum of Agriculture in Szreniawa. It also has a church which lies on the Wooden Churches Trail around Puszcza Zielonka.
