= Karłowice, Greater Poland Voivodeship =

Karłowice
- Village
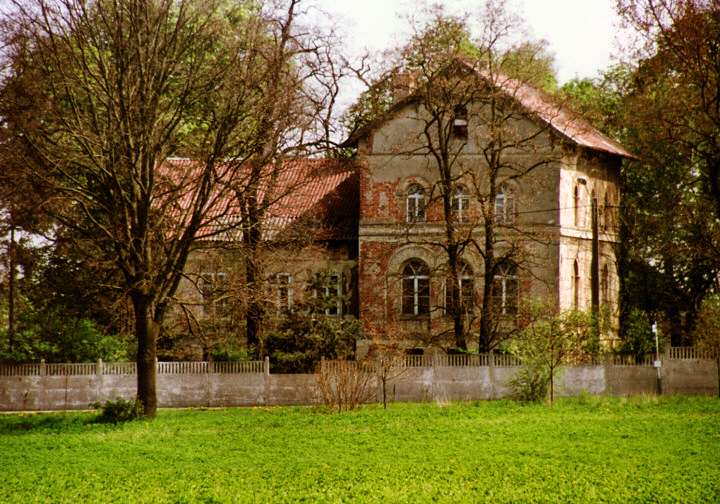
- Manor

- Location within Poland
- Coordinates: 52°30′N 17°7′E
- Country: Poland
- Voivodeship: Greater Poland
- County: Poznań
- Gmina: Swarzędz
- Population: 379

Karłowice [karwɔˈvit͡sɛ] is a village in the administrative district of Gmina Swarzędz, within Poznań County, Greater Poland Voivodeship, in west-central Poland.
