= Mechowo, Greater Poland Voivodeship =

Mechowo
- Settlement
- Location within Poland
- Coordinates: 52°26′44″N 17°3′1″E
- Country: Poland
- Voivodeship: Greater Poland
- County: Poznań
- Gmina: Swarzędz

Mechowo [mɛˈxɔvɔ] is a settlement in the administrative district of Gmina Swarzędz, within Poznań County, Greater Poland Voivodeship, in west-central Poland.
