= Rataje, Poznań =

Area of Poznań, Poland

Coordinates: 52°23′12″N 16°56′55″E

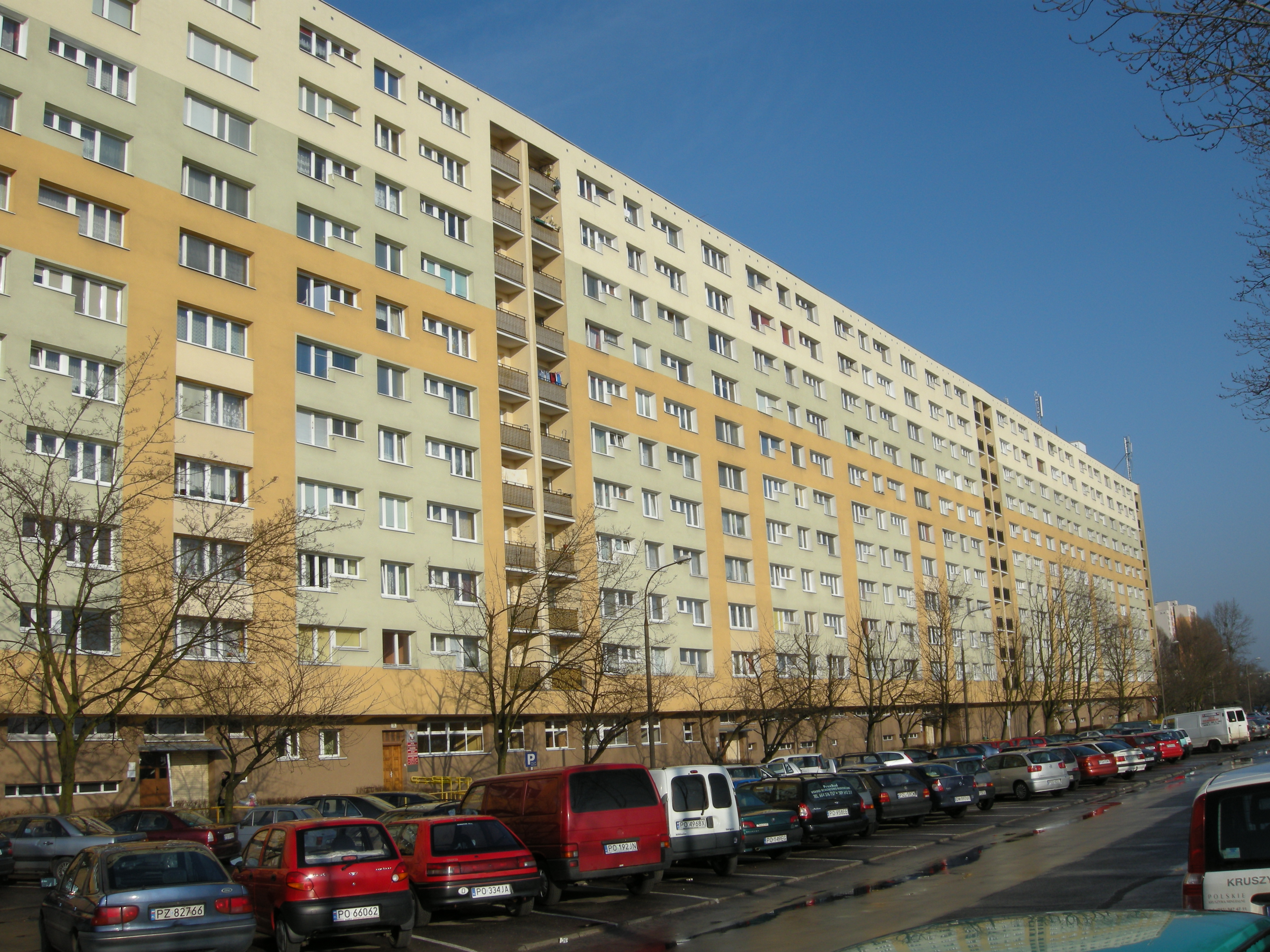
A housing block on Osiedle Bohaterów II Wojny Światowej

Rataje [raˈtajɛ] is a large residential area in the eastern part of the city of Poznań in western Poland. It contains a number of housing estates, consisting mainly of prefabricated concrete panel blocks, housing a total of approximately 90,000 people (about one sixth of the city's total population).

The former village of Rataje was situated close to the right bank of the river Warta, and was incorporated into the city of Poznań in 1925. The area today referred to as Rataje also includes the former villages of Chartowo and Żegrze, brought within the city boundaries during the time of Nazi occupation in the early 1940s. The area was within the city's former Nowe Miasto district (1954–1990); in the current administrative division of Poznań it is divided into three osiedles called Rataje, Chartowo and Żegrze. (This use of the word "osiedle" should not be confused with the more common one denoting a housing estate.)

Building of the new estates began in the late 1960s, the first block being completed in 1967.

The main estates are as follows:

- In "lower Rataje" (the areas closer to the Warta): Osiedle Armii Krajowej ("Home Army Estate"), Osiedle Bohaterów II Wojny Światowej ("World War II Heroes Estate"), Osiedle Jagiellońskie ("Jagiellonian Estate"), Osiedle Oświecenia ("Enlightenment Estate"), Osiedle Piastowskie ("Piast Estate"), Osiedle Powstań Narodowych ("National Uprisings Estate") and Osiedle Rzeczypospolitej ("Estate of the Polish Republic").
- In the Chartowo area (the north-eastern estates): Osiedle Lecha, Osiedle Czecha, Osiedle Rusa (named after the legendary brothers Lech, Czech and Rus), Osiedle Tysiąclecia ("Millennium Estate", named for the millennium of the Baptism of Poland of 966), Osiedle Zodiak ("Zodiac Estate"; a newer estate also containing smaller houses).
- In the Żegrze area (the south-eastern estates): Osiedle Orła Białego ("White Eagle Estate"), Osiedle Polan ("Polans Estate"), Osiedle Stare Żegrze ("Old Żegrze Estate").

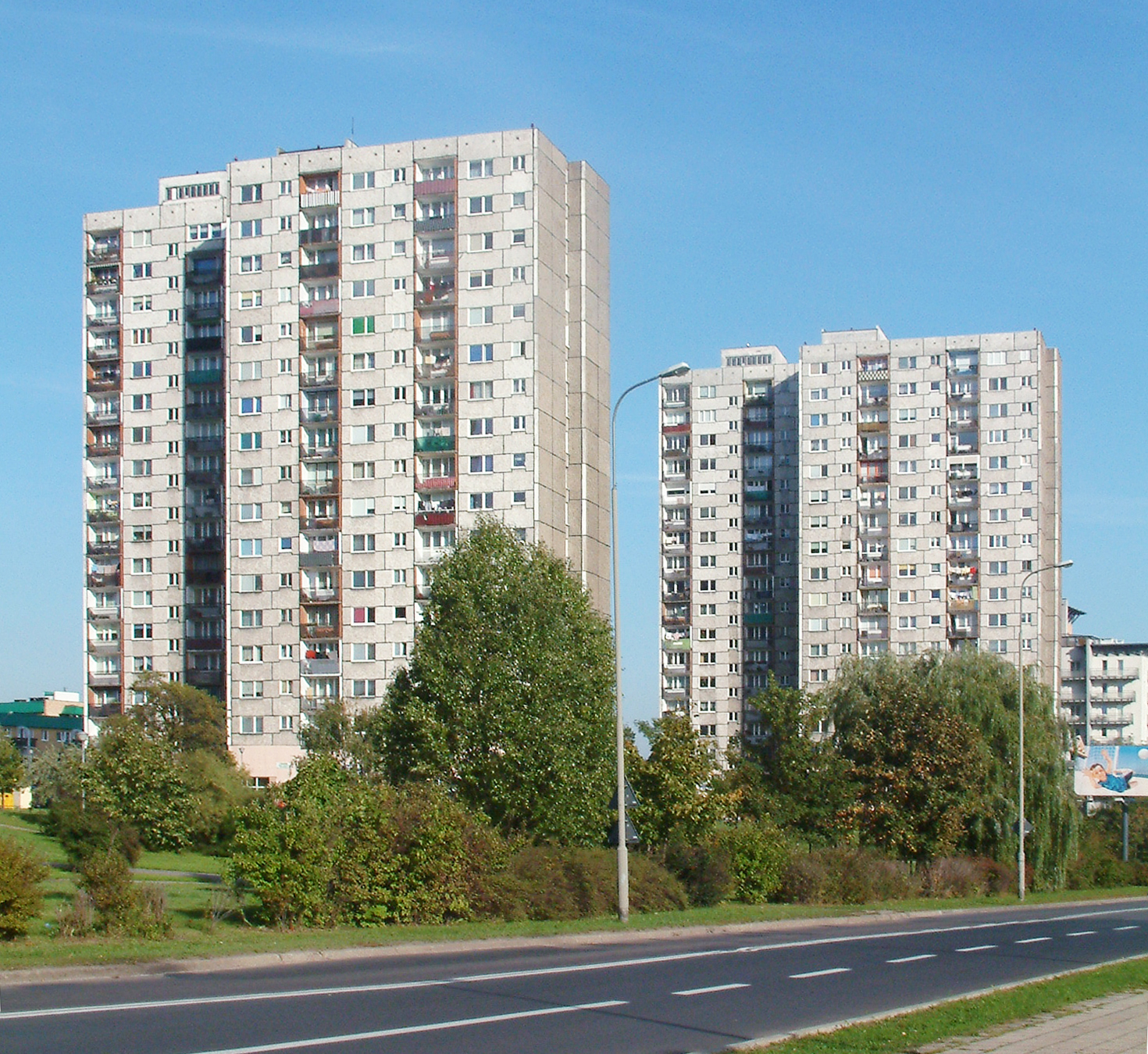
High-rise blocks on Osiedle Rusa

Some of the estates were renamed after the fall of communism: os. Armii Krajowej was originally called Osiedle Manifestu Lipcowego ("July Manifesto Estate"), os. Stare Żegrze was Osiedle Związku Walki Młodych ("Estate of the Union of Fighting Youth"), os. Orła Białego was Osiedle Związku Młodzieży Polskiej ("Estate of the Union of Polish Youth"), and os. Polan was Osiedle Związku Młodzieży Socjalistycznej ("Estate of the Union of Socialist Youth"). These three Unions were successive communist youth organizations in Poland.

The estates were built under the auspices of the Osiedle Młodych housing cooperative, which was founded in 1958 (its name means "young people's estate"). Today the cooperative has around 40,000 members, and continues to administer most of the buildings and estate infrastructure.

The Lake Malta recreational area, and the neighbouring Malta shopping and entertainment complex, are situated just north of Rataje. At the south-eastern corner of the Rataje estates, in the Franowo neighbourhood, is a group of several large retail centres and a multiplex cinema.

Rataje has a number of tram lines connecting it with the city centre and other parts of Poznań. It is also served by various bus routes, mostly terminating at the bus station on the Rataje roundabout (Rondo Rataje). The main road out of Poznań in the direction of Katowice runs through Rataje (between Chartowo and Żegrze), mostly as an elevated road.
