= Janikowo, Greater Poland Voivodeship =

Janikowo
- Village
- Location within Poland
- Coordinates: 52°26′N 17°2′E
- Country: Poland
- Voivodeship: Greater Poland
- County: Poznań
- Gmina: Swarzędz
- Population: 474

Janikowo [janiˈkɔvɔ] is a village in the administrative district of Gmina Swarzędz, within Poznań County, Greater Poland Voivodeship, in west-central Poland.
