= Paulina Wilkońska =

Polish novelist, editor and diarist

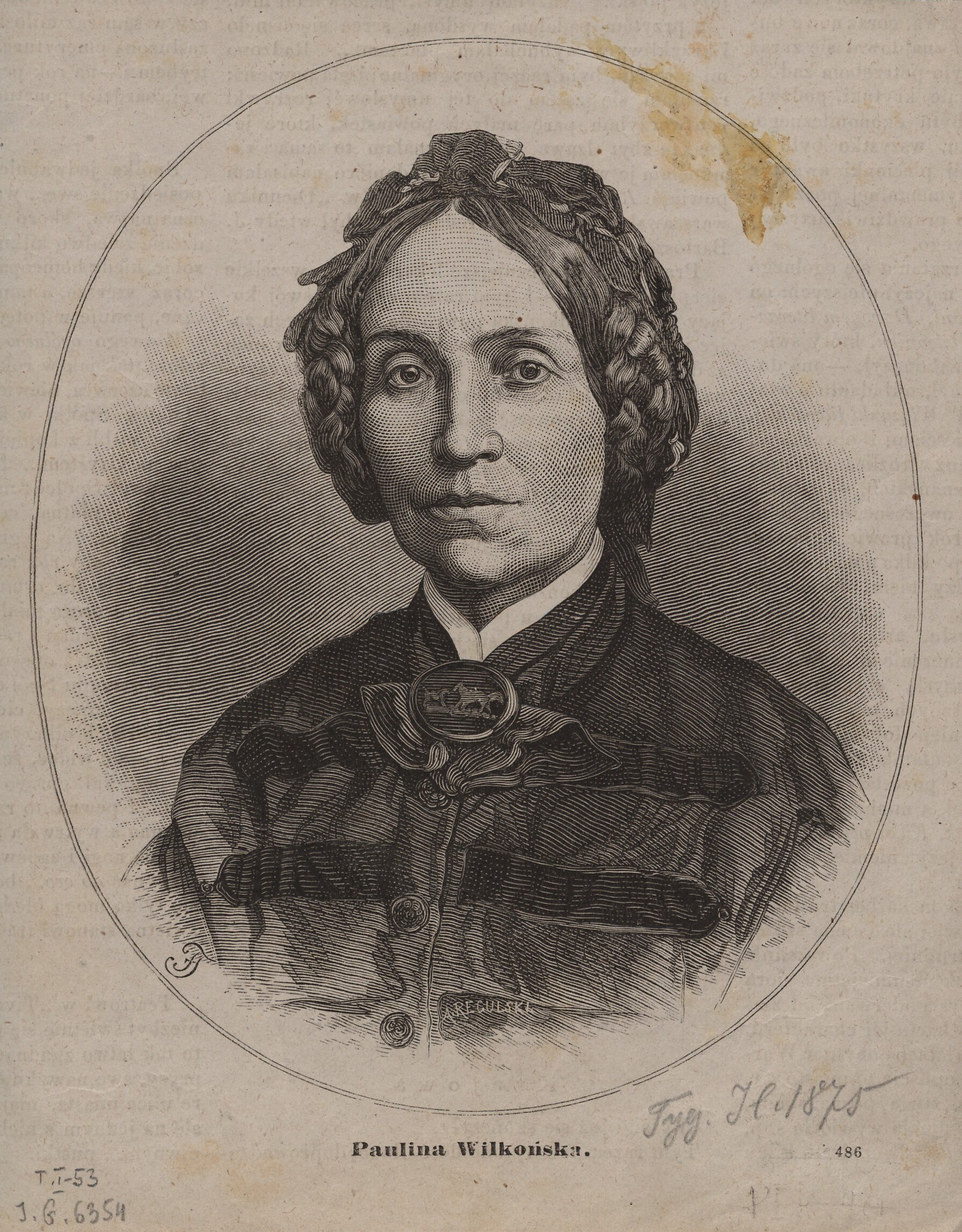
- Born: 1815; Warsaw-Siekierki, Poland
- Died: 9 June 1875 (aged 59–60); Poznań, Poland
- Occupations: novelist, editor, diarist

Paulina Wilkońska (1815 – 9 June 1875) was a Polish novelist, editor and diarist.

== Biography ==
Paulina Wilkońska was born in Warsaw-Siekierki in 1815. Her mother was Regina Zadolskich, and her father was Karol Laucz. She studied at Poznań. She married August Wilkoński in 1832. From 1840 to 1851, she led the Warsaw literary salon, with connections to those in the Library of Warsaw, Review of Scientific and Warsaw bohemians. In 1851, the couple left Warsaw after the expulsion of the Russian occupation, relocating to Greater Poland. Wilkońska was widowed in 1852, and continued to write.

Wilkońska published her first volume of prose in 1841, Village and city. She published other works of fiction, but also memoirs in 1871, and 1875. Her memoirs documented the intellectual life and political Warsaw. Władysław Syrokomla stated that Wilkońska was the inspiration for his poem Margier. She died in Poznań in 1875.
