= Starołęka =

- Neighbourhood
- Nickname: Mała
- Country: Poland
- Voivodeship: Greater Poland
- City: Poznań
- District: Nowe Miasto
- Town rights: 1253
- Noble village rights: 1314
- First council election: 11 June 1919
- Incorporated into city: 1 January 1925
- Time zone: UTC+1 (CET)
  - Summer (DST): UTC+2 (CEST)
- Area code: 61
- Vehicle registration: PO

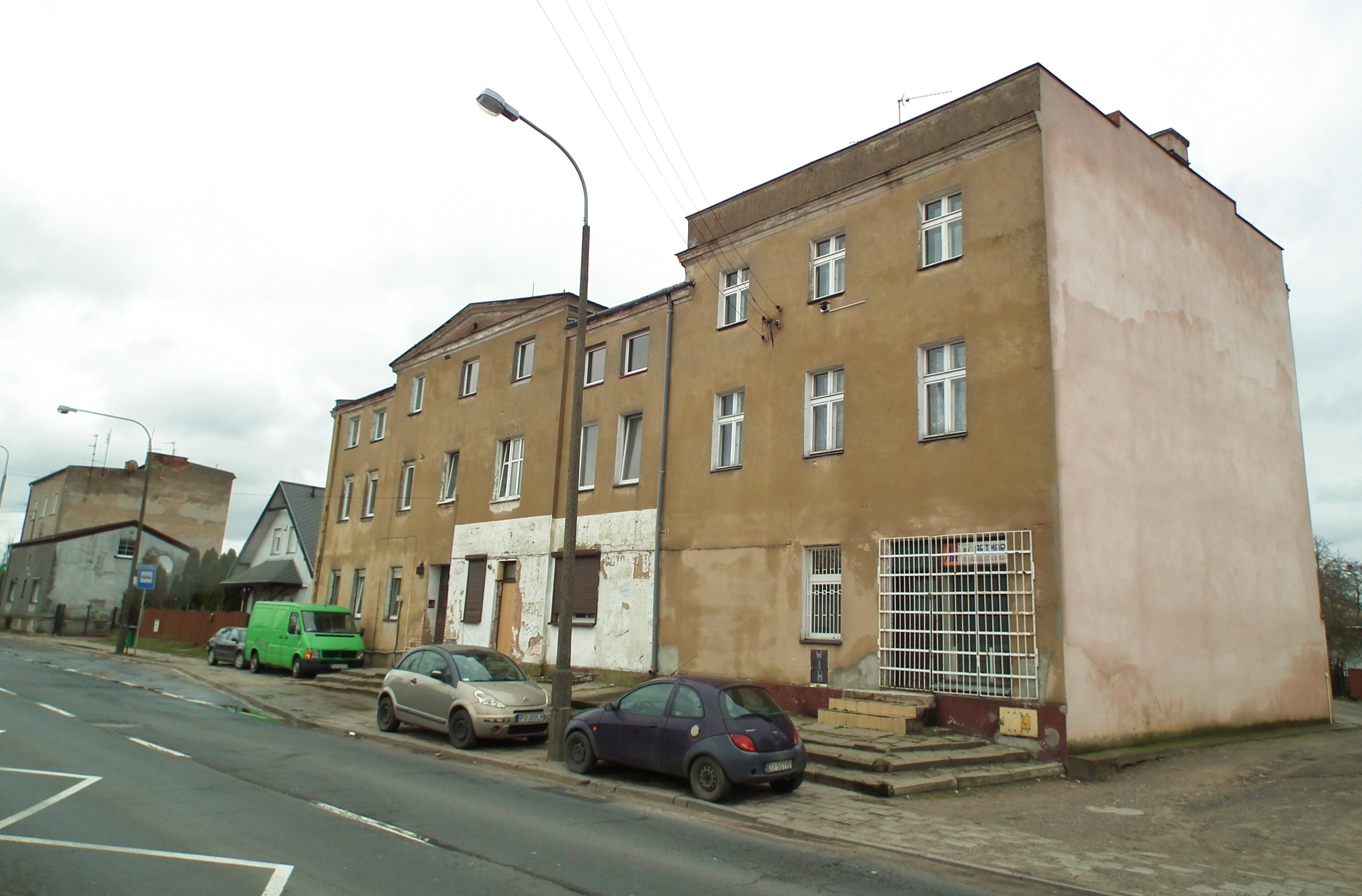
A photo in Starołęka

Starołęka (German: Luisenhain) is a historic neighbourhood, formerly a village, in the New City district of Poznań. It lies to the east of the Warta river.

It was formed initially as the merger of two villages: Starołęka Mała and Starołęka Wielka (literally Little and Great). Part of the lands used to belong to the Carmelite monastery and was integrated into the old Poznań voivodeship as far back as the 16th Century.

In 1905 a lighted bridge was installed and a train station expanded; however the pre-existing smaller local railway station in turn was closed down resulting in (unsuccessful) local protests. In 1905 the local library society was founded, in 1908 the local volunteer fire brigade was formed. The area was under German occupation during World War II.

Throughout its history the area has struggled to be incorporated into the city limits due to poor transportation links with the city centre; the roads were unlighted, unpaved and often muddy and the first tramline arrived as recently as 1955. During the Polish People's Republic era it was mostly an industrial neighbourhood.

In modern times it is a mostly residential area and an important transport hub for the city.
