= Porta Posnania =

History center in Poznań, Poland

- Brama Poznania ICHOT
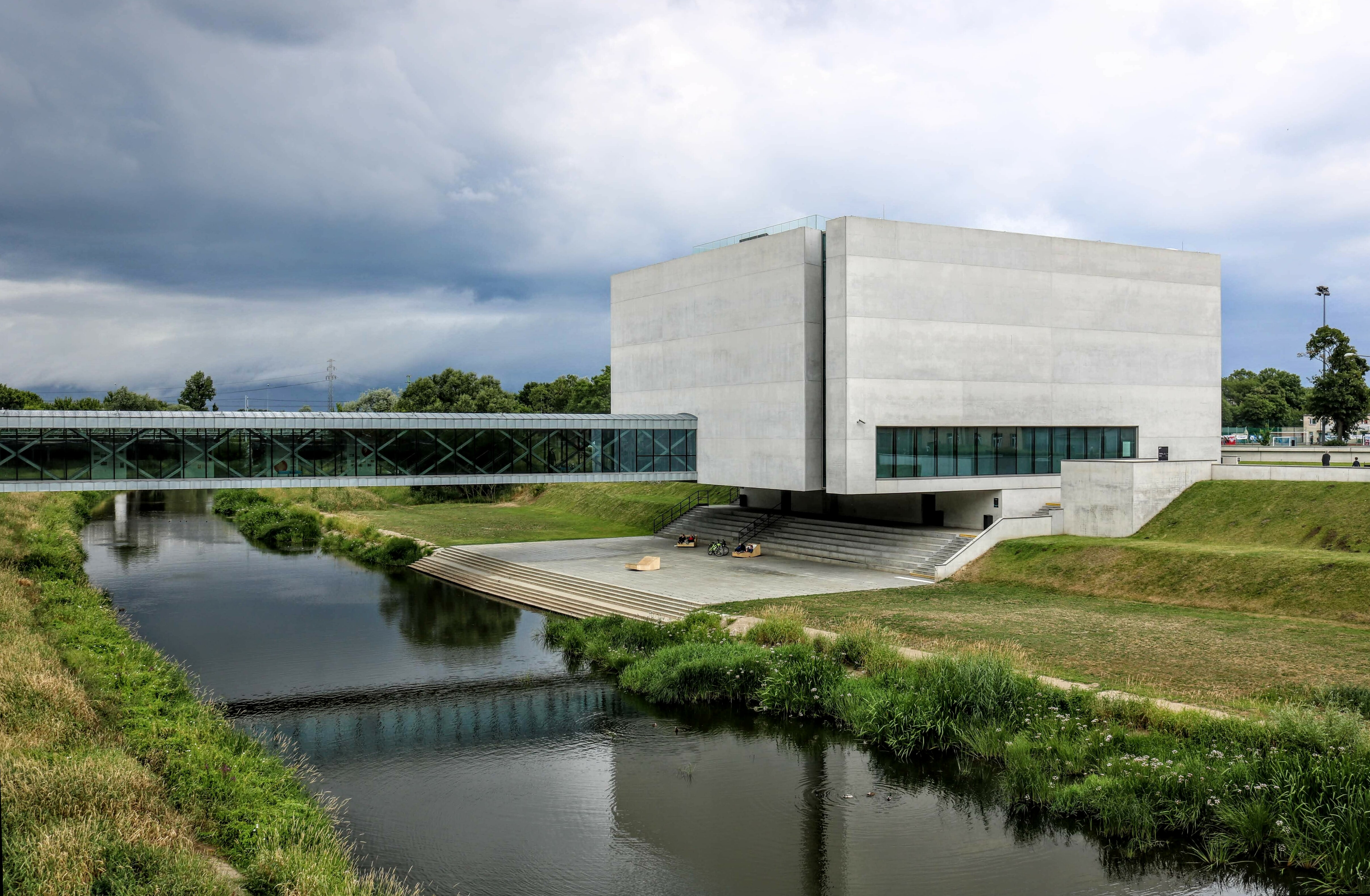
- Established: 1 May 2014; 12 years ago
- Location: 2 Gdańska street, Poznań, Poland
- Coordinates: 52°24′44″N 16°57′06″E
- Director: Monika Herkt
- Website: bramapoznania.pl/en/

Porta Posnania (Polish: Brama Poznania ICHOT) is an interactive heritage center in Poznań dedicated to the history of Cathedral Island (Polish: Ostrów Tumski) the most ancient district of the city, in particular, the role that this place played in the times of the formation of the Polish Statehood. The opening took place on May 1, 2014. Porta Posnania consists of two parts: the main concrete building (on the Śródka side) and the 19th century Cathedral Lock, which are connected by a glass footbridge over river Cybina. The Porta Posnania is a brand of the Poznań Historical Heritage Center, a local cultural institution of the city of Poznań, and at the same time is its residence.

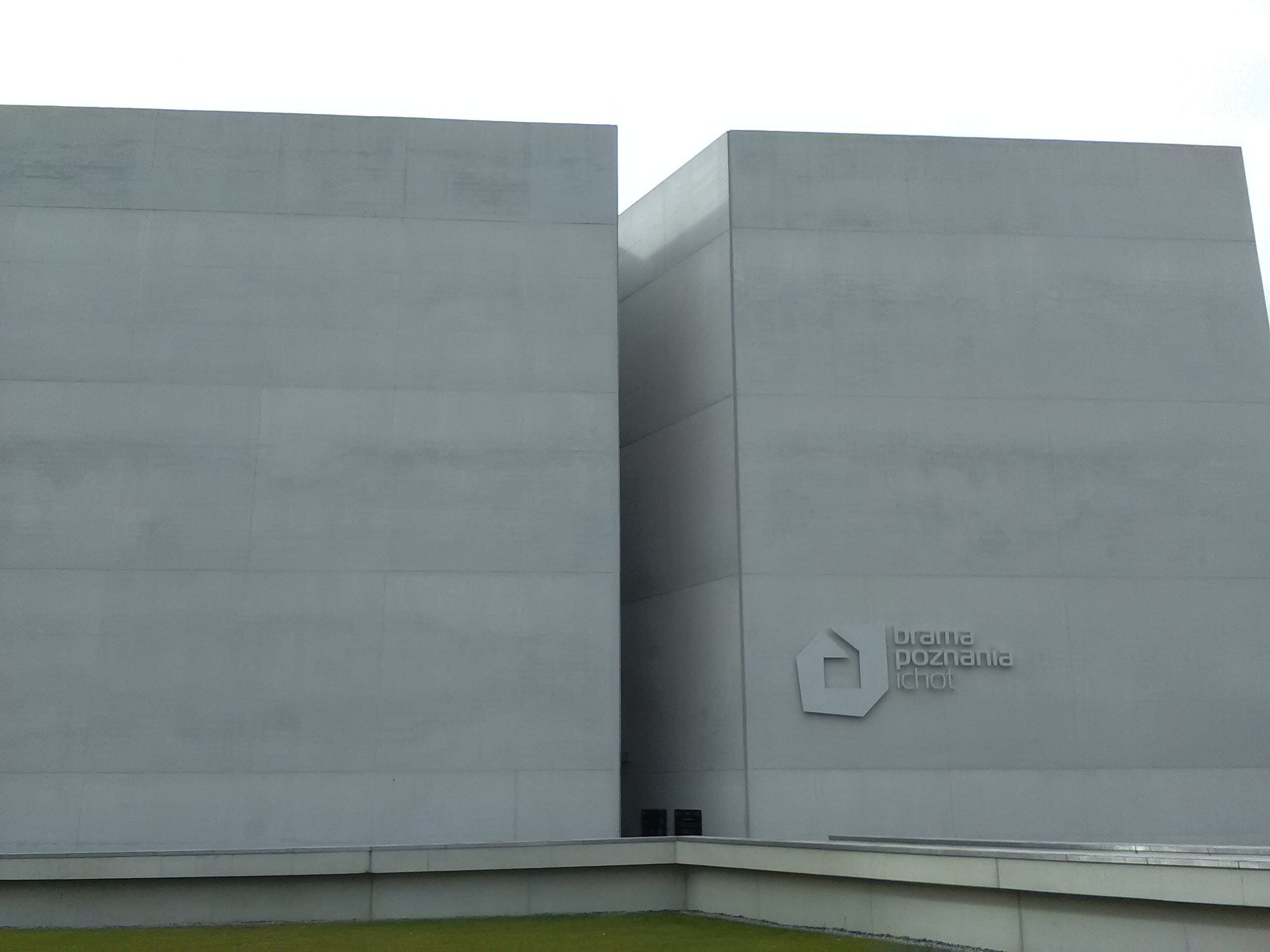
Main entrance

== History ==
The idea of creating a new interactive heritage center was connected with the extensive program of revitalization of the Śródka district “Poznań Development Plan for 2005-2010”. At the same time, a new tourist product called the Poznań Royal-Imperial Route (Polish: Trakt Królewsko-Cesarski) was being created, which included Porta Posnania. On March 9, 2009, an international competition was announced for the construction of the Interactive Center for the History of Cathedral Island. 26 projects were presented at the competition, in which Kraków-based studio Ad Artis Architects won. The exhibition project was developed by the Belgian company Tempora SA, which specializes in designing narrative exhibitions.The process of creating the exhibition was supervised by the archaeologist professor Hanna Kóčka-Krenz, who discovered the palas of Mieszko I - the first ruler of Poland.

== Architecture ==
The authors of the project are architects: Arkadiusz Emerla and Maciej Wojda from Kraków studio Ad Artis Architects. Porta Posnania is a complete urban complex which consists of the main building in the shape of a concrete minimalist cube, the 19th cathedral lock (where Śluza Gallery is currently located) and the pedestrian bridge (that connects these two buildings), the amphitheater over the river Cybina, the entrance to the main building in the form of a zigzag, a park with plane trees and concrete benches and a parking for visitors. Inside, the main building is divided into two parts by a long corridor with a glass ceiling. The upper floors of the exhibition are connected by glass bridges. Passing from hall to hall at the exhibition on these bridges, visitors can see through the window the cathedral, which is located on Cathedral Island opposite the Porta Posnania.

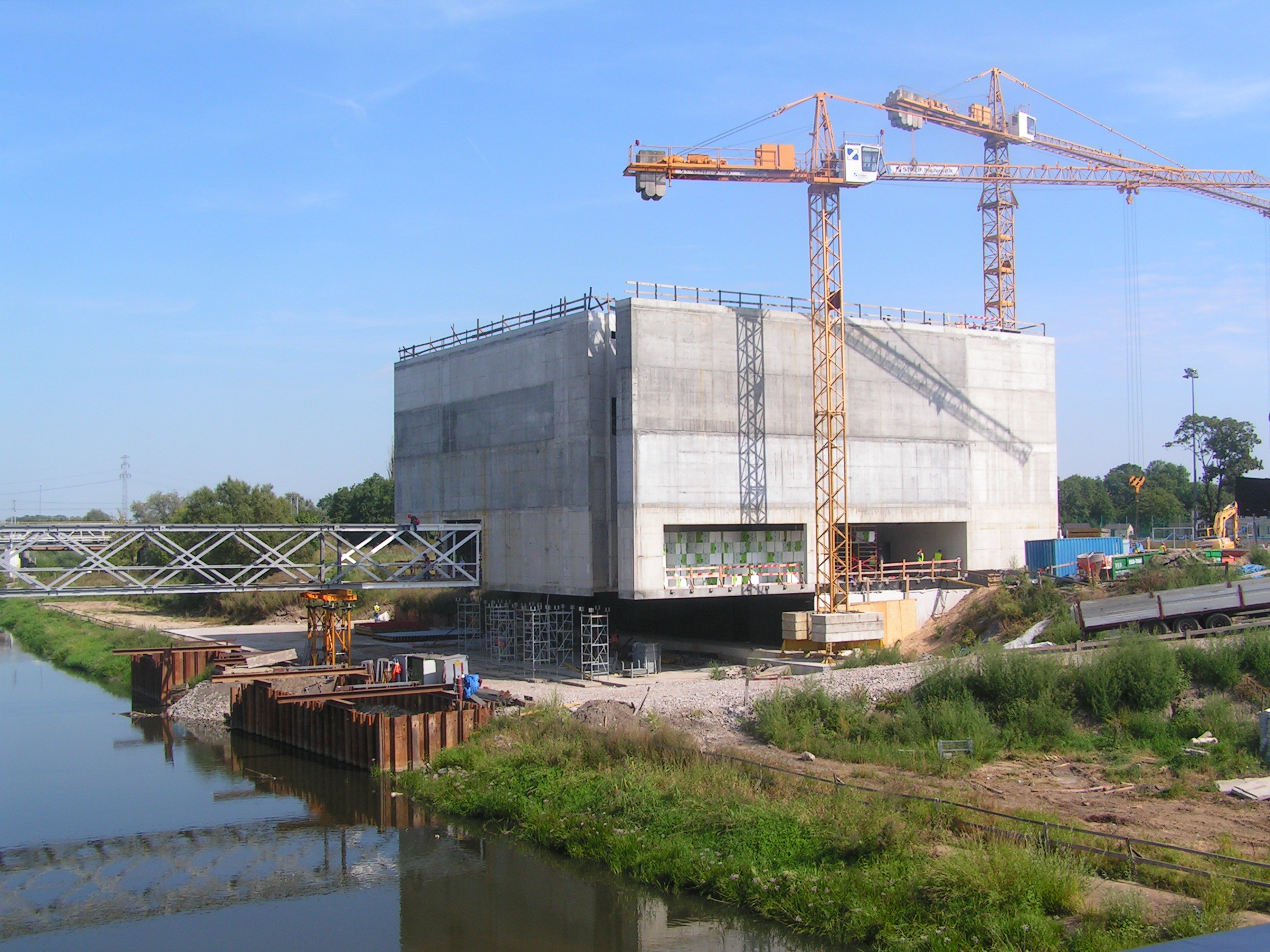
Porta Posnania in construction, August 2012

== Permanent exhibition ==
The main interactive exhibition of Porta Posnania presenting the history of Tumski Island, the oldest part of the city and it consists of multimedia installations, screens, various layouts and small interactive rooms for children. The exposition is divided into four thematic halls: Castle, Water, Gold and Stained Glass. It covers the period from the foundation of the castle in the 10th century to the present day. Audioguides are available in English, German, French, Spanish, Czech, Russian, and Ukrainian, with three specially designed audiotour routes - one for individuals, one for groups, and one for families. The exhibition is adapted for visitors with disabilities.

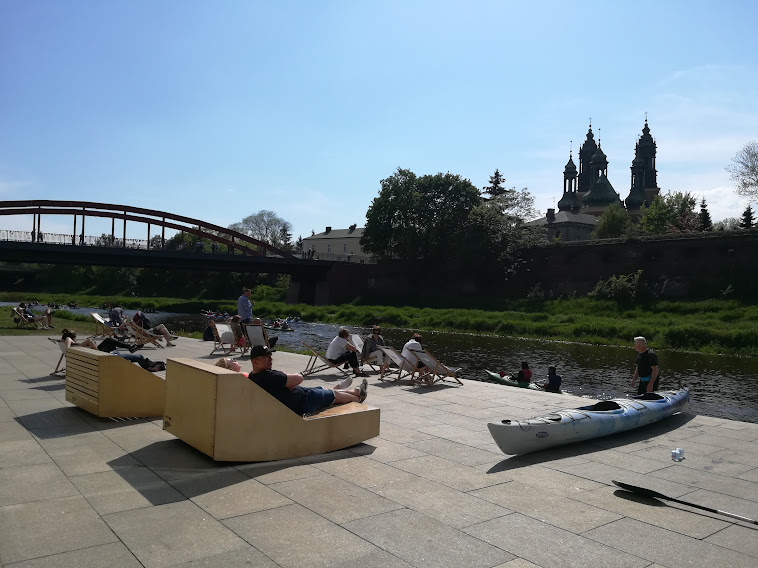
Amphitheater on the Cybina River

== Śluza Gallery ==
The Cathedral Lock is a historical fragment of the former Poznań Fortress, built in 1834-1839, which was part of a non-existent military hydraulic structure. Today, the Cathedral Lock has been converted into a "Śluza Gallery" that hosts temporary exhibitions and master classes

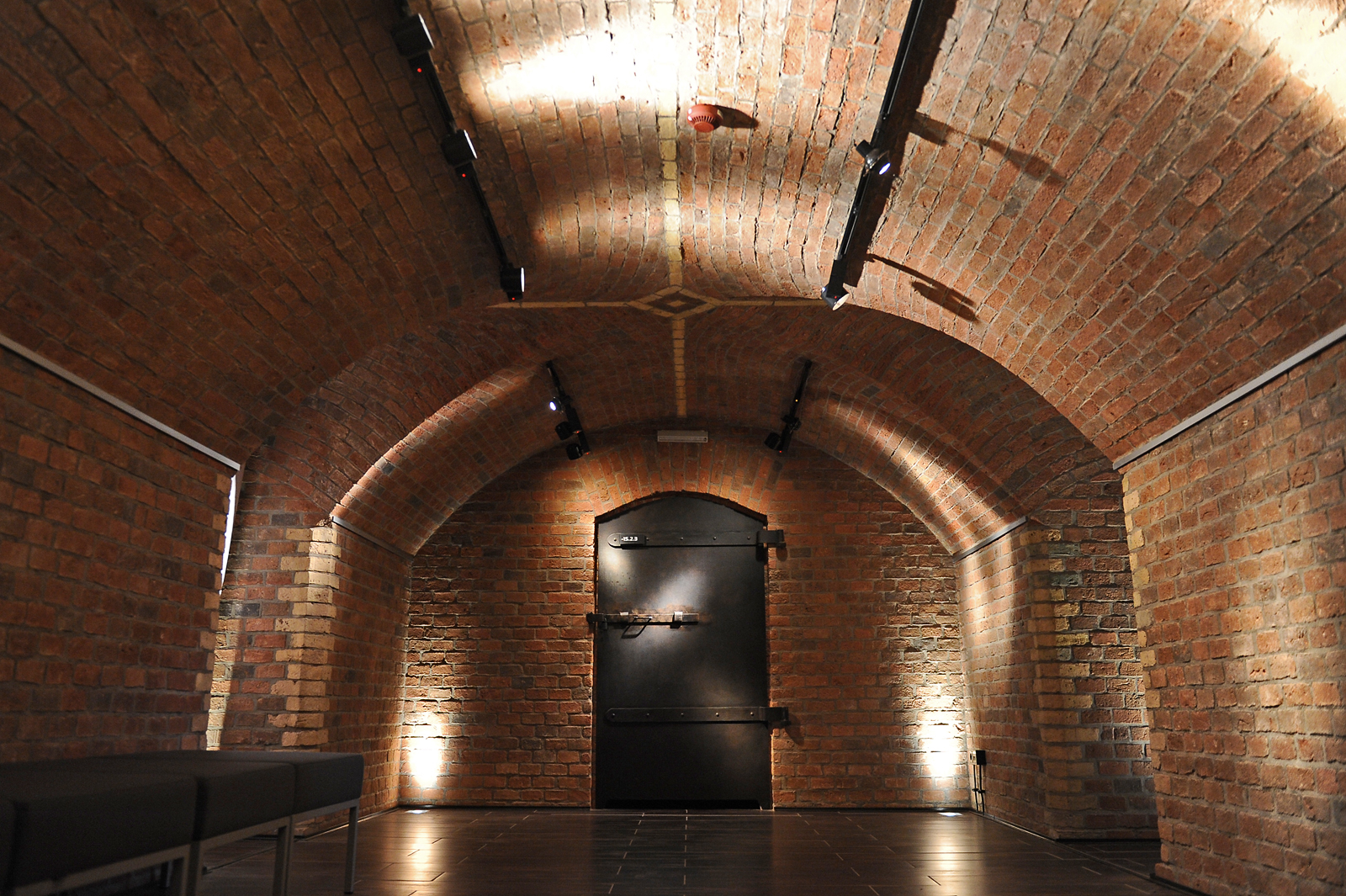
Śluza Gallery - interior

=== List of temporary exhibitions ===
- "Sounds around Cybina river" 17.07.2021-31.10.2021
- "Lures and traps" 15.05.2021-04.07.2021
- "Women of science. The first women who made academic careers in Poznań" 27.11-2021-08.03.2022
- "The city (re)constructed. Post-war restoration of the stately buildings in Poznań" 01.12.2020-03.05.2021
- "In God's and people's books. The world of Jan Lubrański" 07.03.2020-27.09.2020
- "Exhibition: Home. City is garden. Works of Janina and Władysław Czarnecki" 28.09.2019-02.02.2020
- "Animals of Cybina" 06.07.2019-15.09.2019
- "100 sculpture - past - present - future" 16.03.2019-23.06.2019
- "Z klocków. Jak poukładać miasto?" 29.09.2018-02.12.2018
- "Scenes of no importance" 19.01.2019-10.03.2019
- "Cybina plants" 30.06.2018-23.09.2018
- "No compromise! Julia Woykowska" 08.04.2018-24.06.2018
- "100 lat. Jak zorganizowano wolność" 17.03.2018-31.12.2018
- "Archeologia Miejsca. Przedmioty wyobrażone" 04.03.2018-25.03.2018
- "Miasto jak się patrzy" 14.01.2018-25.03.2018
- "Efekt mostu" 15.12.2017-28.01.2018
- "Elektrownia Garbary. Dokument potencjalny" 23.06.2017-17.09.2017
- "Józef Rogaliński - Z wiarą i drobnowidzem przez wiek XVIII" 17.03.2017-17.06.2017
- "Who can walk the red carpet?" 23.09.2016-15.01.2017
- "Za kurtyna milczenia. Pamięć Poznańskiego Czerwca 1956 w PRL" 09.06.2016-18.09.2016
- "Mosty – wystawa prac Filipa T.A.K" 10.03.2016-29.05.2016
- "Między Wschodem a Zachodem – fotografie z Góry Athos" 15.01.2016-07.03.2016
- "Mieczysław Halka-Ledóchowski – Kardynał nieZNANY" 12.03.2015-26.07.2015
- "Z rzeką w tle. Biografia Śluzy Katedralnej" 15.11.2014-01.03.2015

== Awards ==
- Jan Baptiste Quadro Award (2013)
- The title of one of the 7 new Tourist Wonders of Poland (5th place) in the National Geographic competition (2014)

== Gallery ==
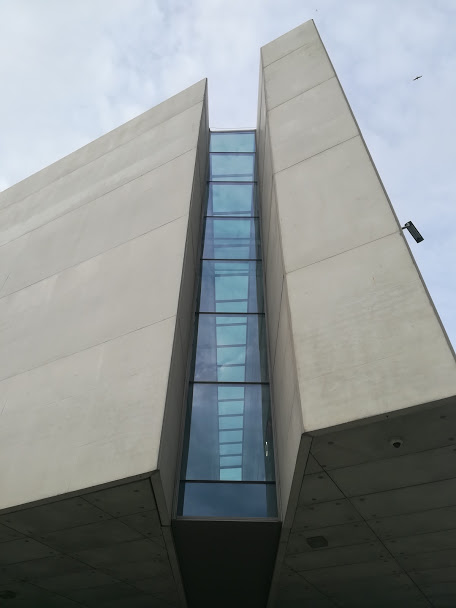
The main building of Porta Posnania

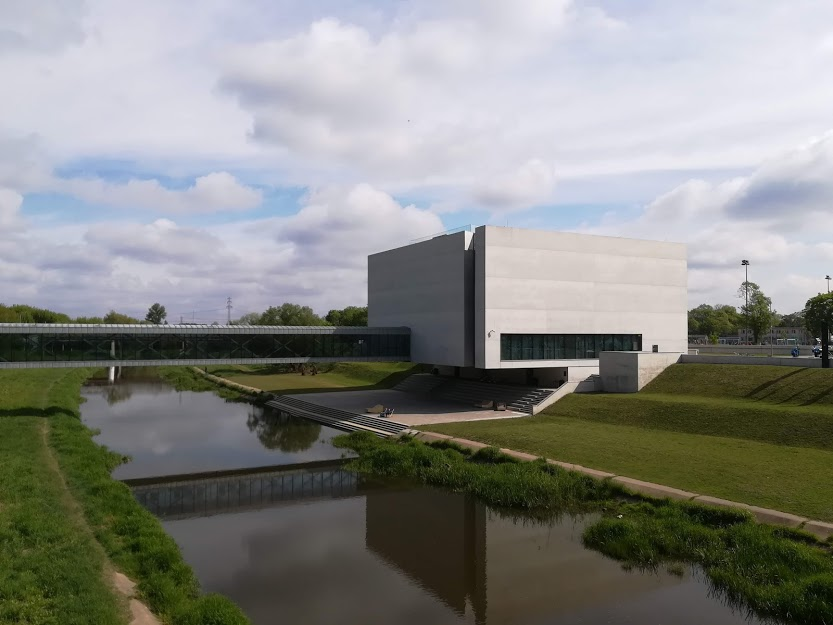
The main building and amphitheater

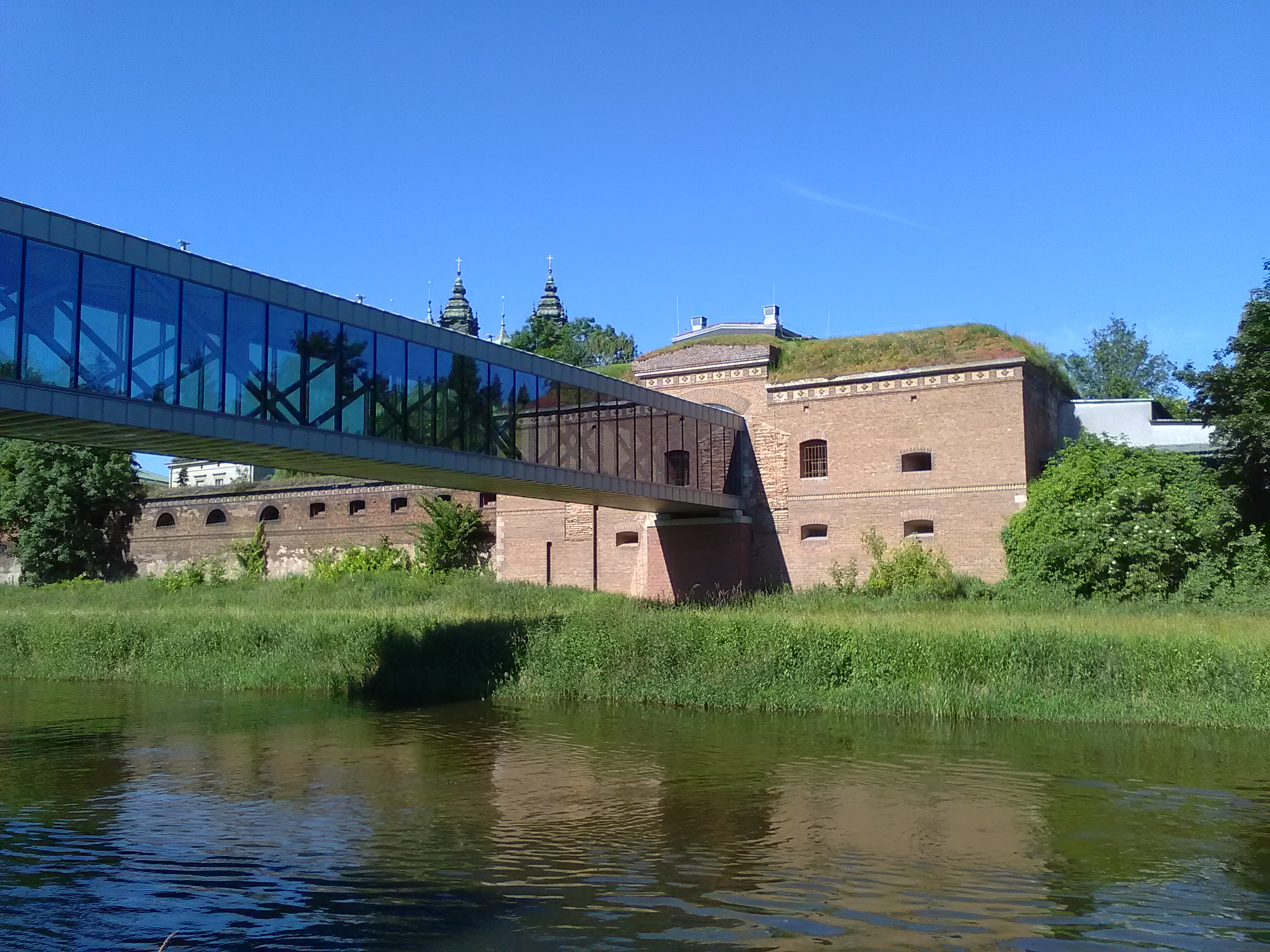
Pedestrian bridge on Cybina river and the Cathedral Lock

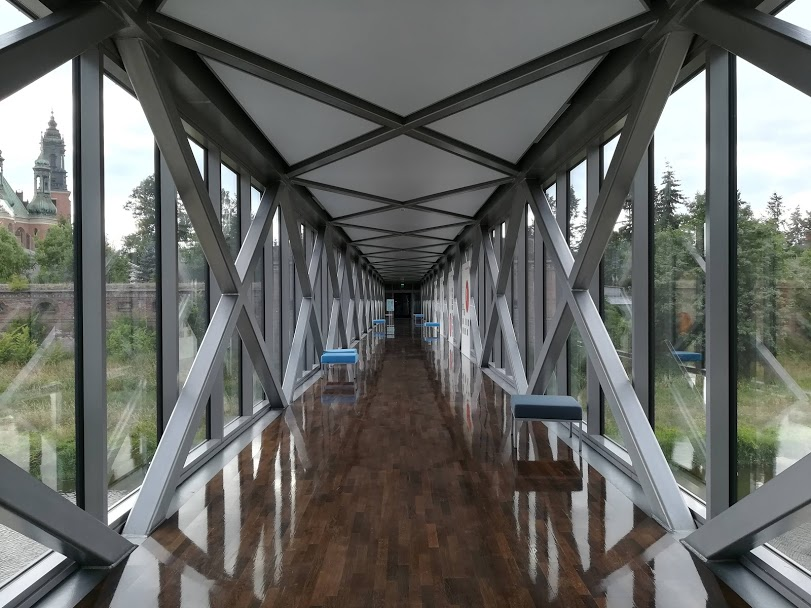
Inside the pedestrian bridge

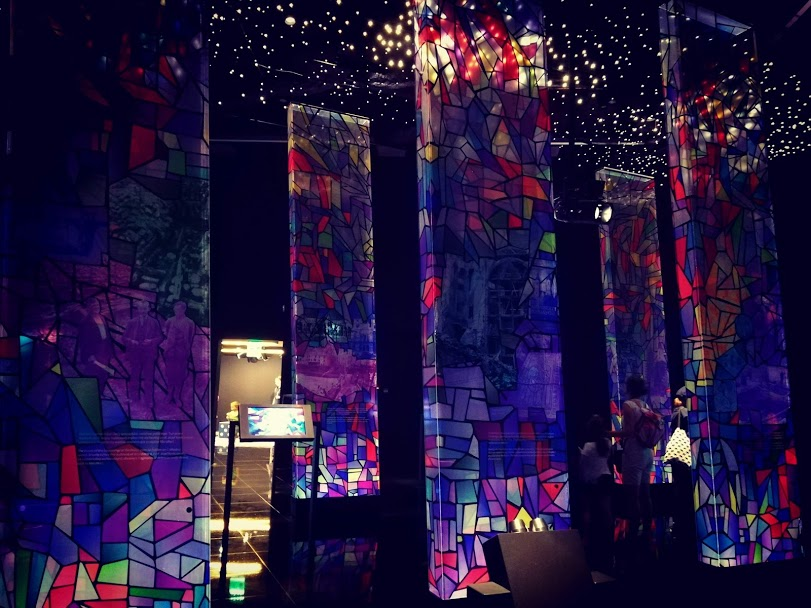
Fragment of permanent exhibition

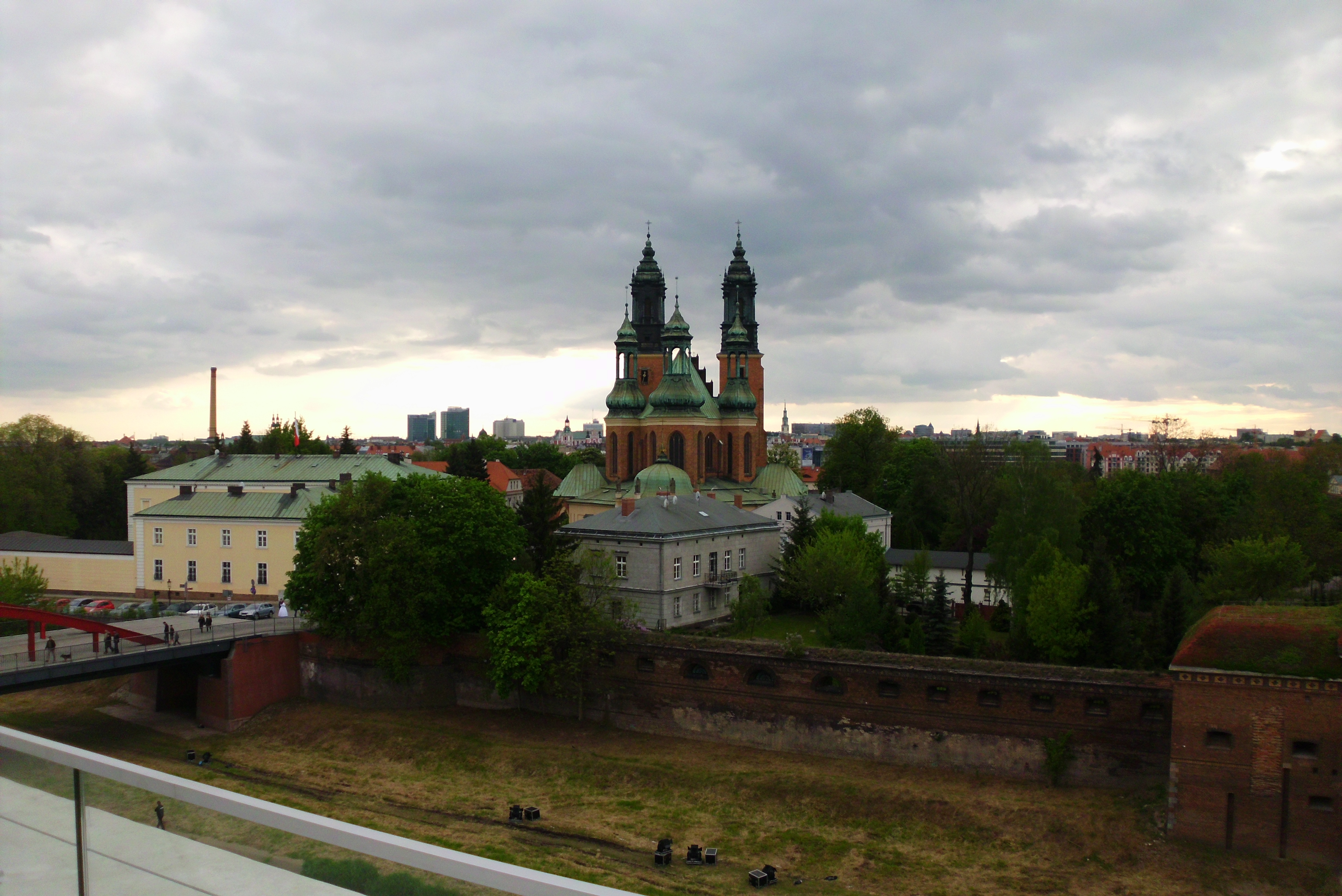
View from rooftop terrace of Porta Posnania

== See also ==
- Enigma Cipher Centre

== Bibliography ==
- Paweł Klimek: "Polska industrialna", Wydawnictwo Pascal, Bielsko-Biała 2018
- Witold Gostyński, Zbigniew Pilarczyk: Poznań. Fortyfikacje miejskie, Poznań 2004, Wydawnictwo Miejskie, ISBN 83-89525-91-7
