= Poznań Royal-Imperial Route =

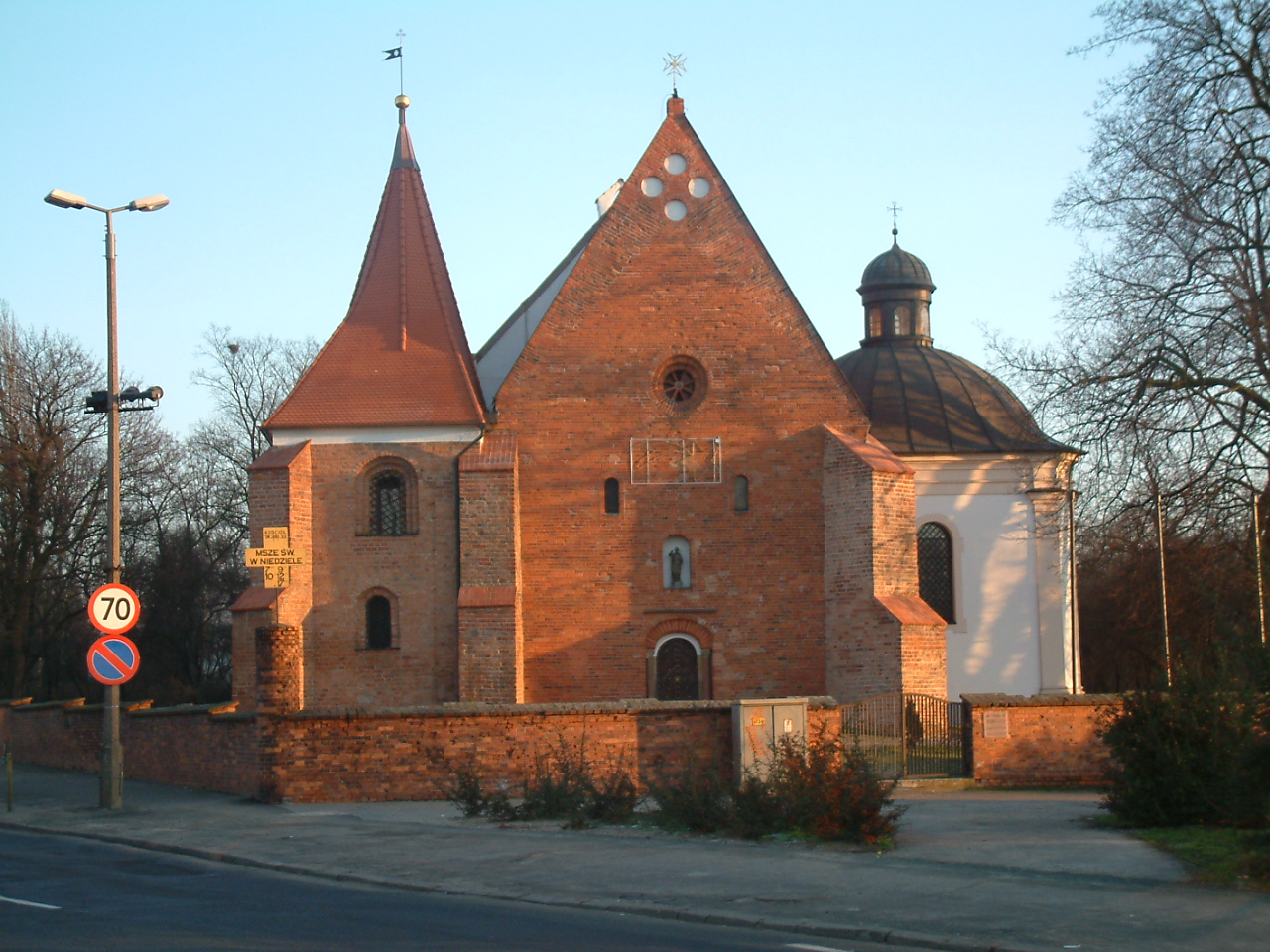
Church of St. John of Jerusalem Outside the Walls from 11th century

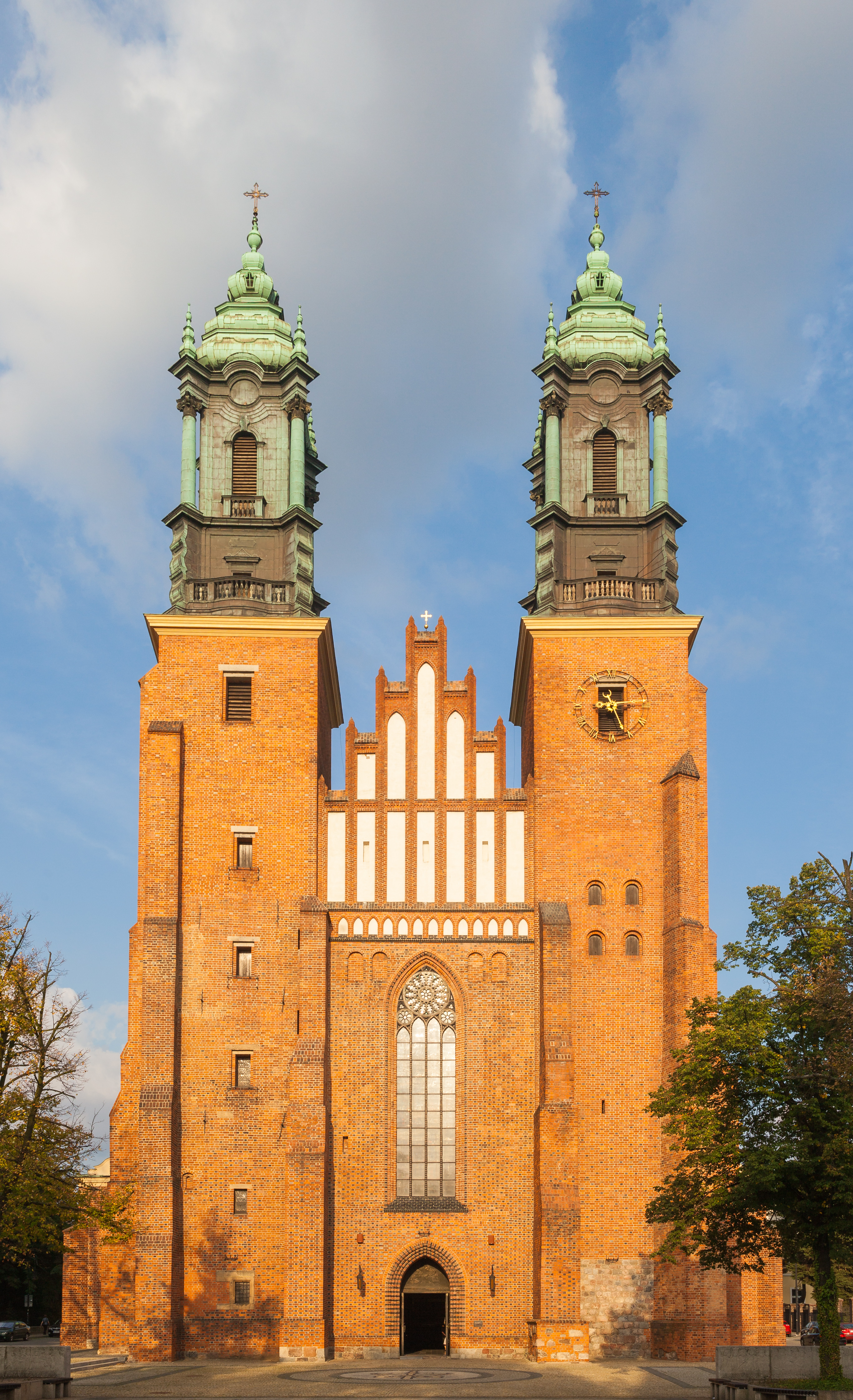
Cathedral of St. Peter and St. Paul

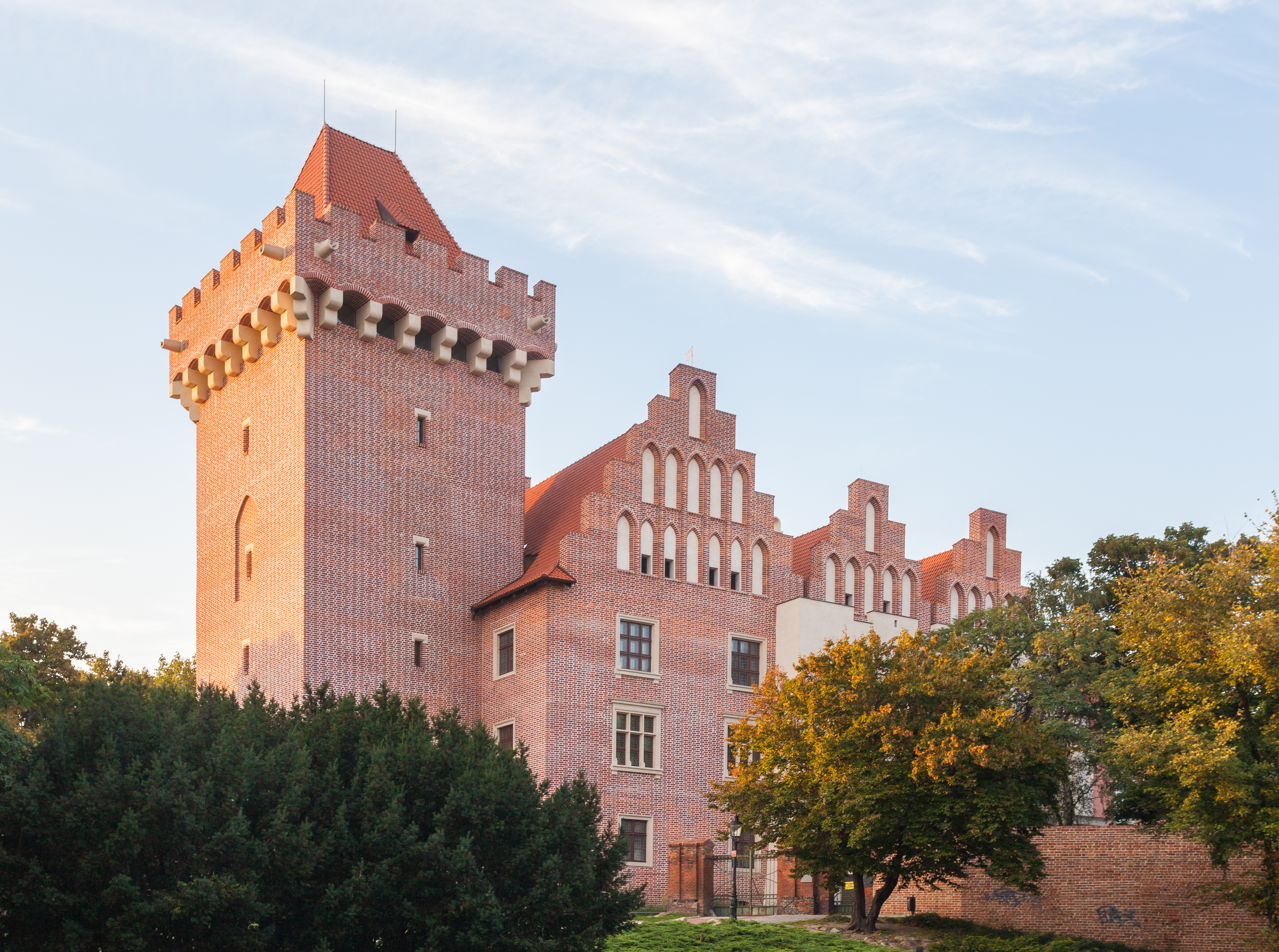
Royal Castle after its total reconstruction

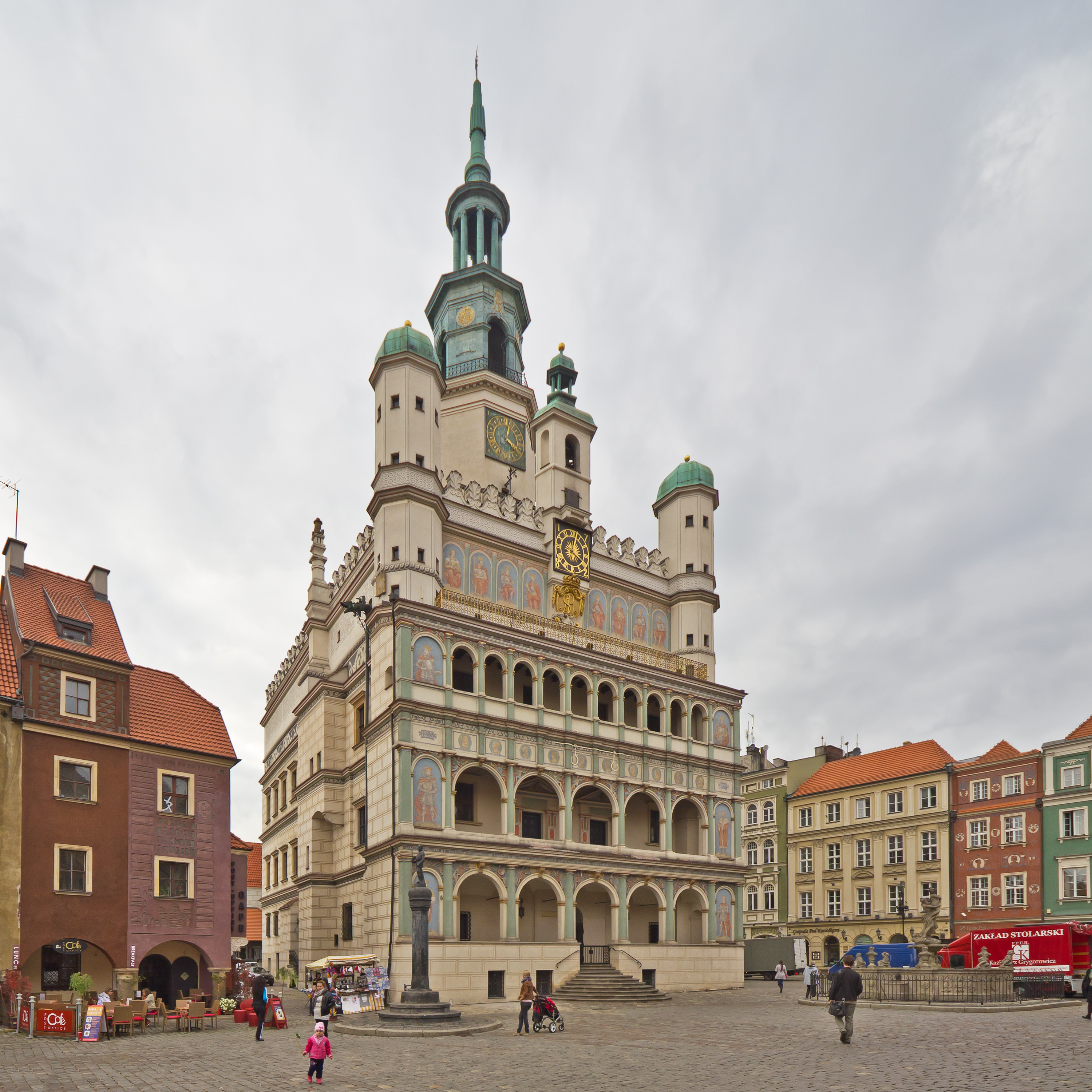
Poznań Town Hall

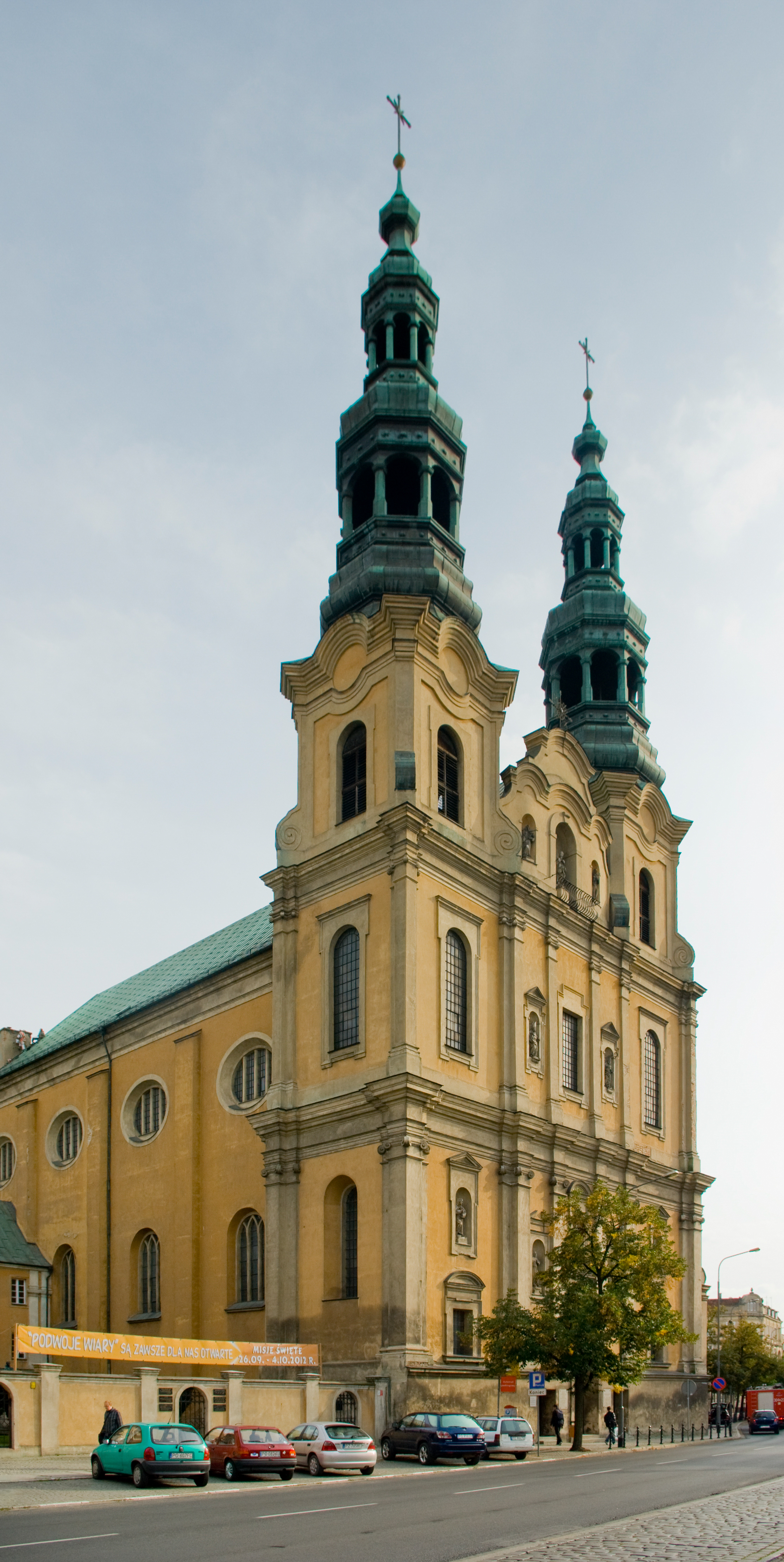
St Francis Seraphic Church

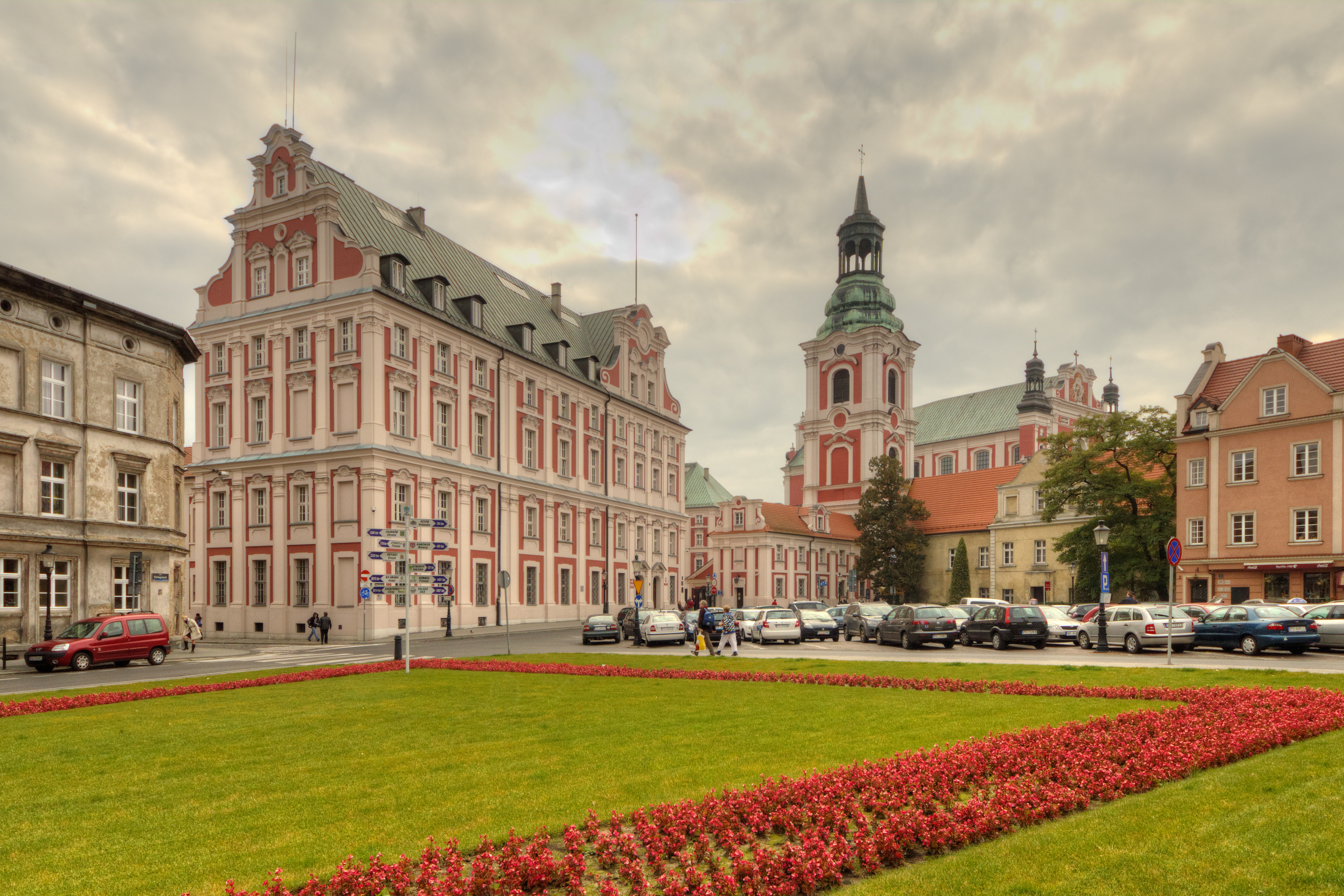
Former Jesuit College

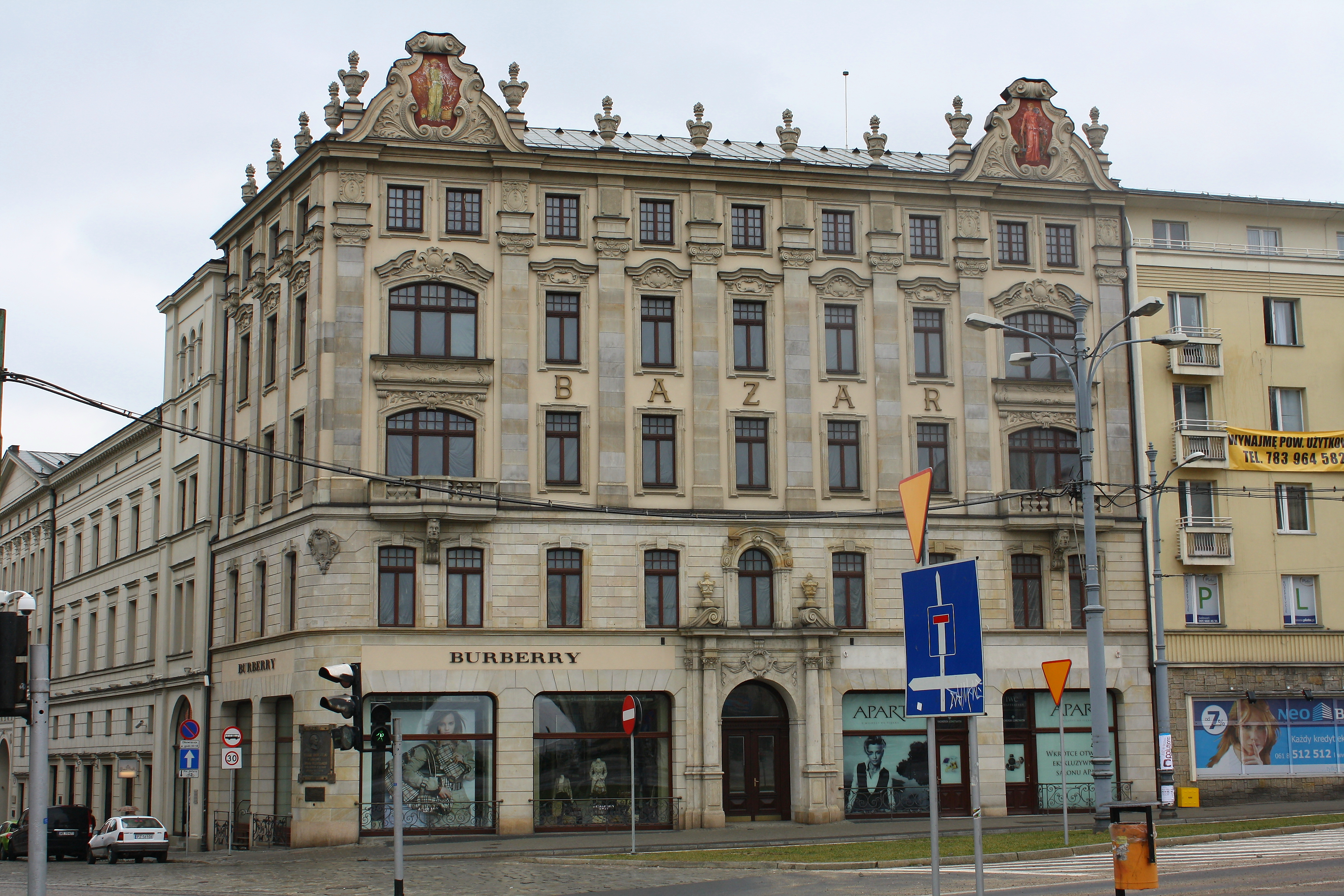
Bazar Hotel

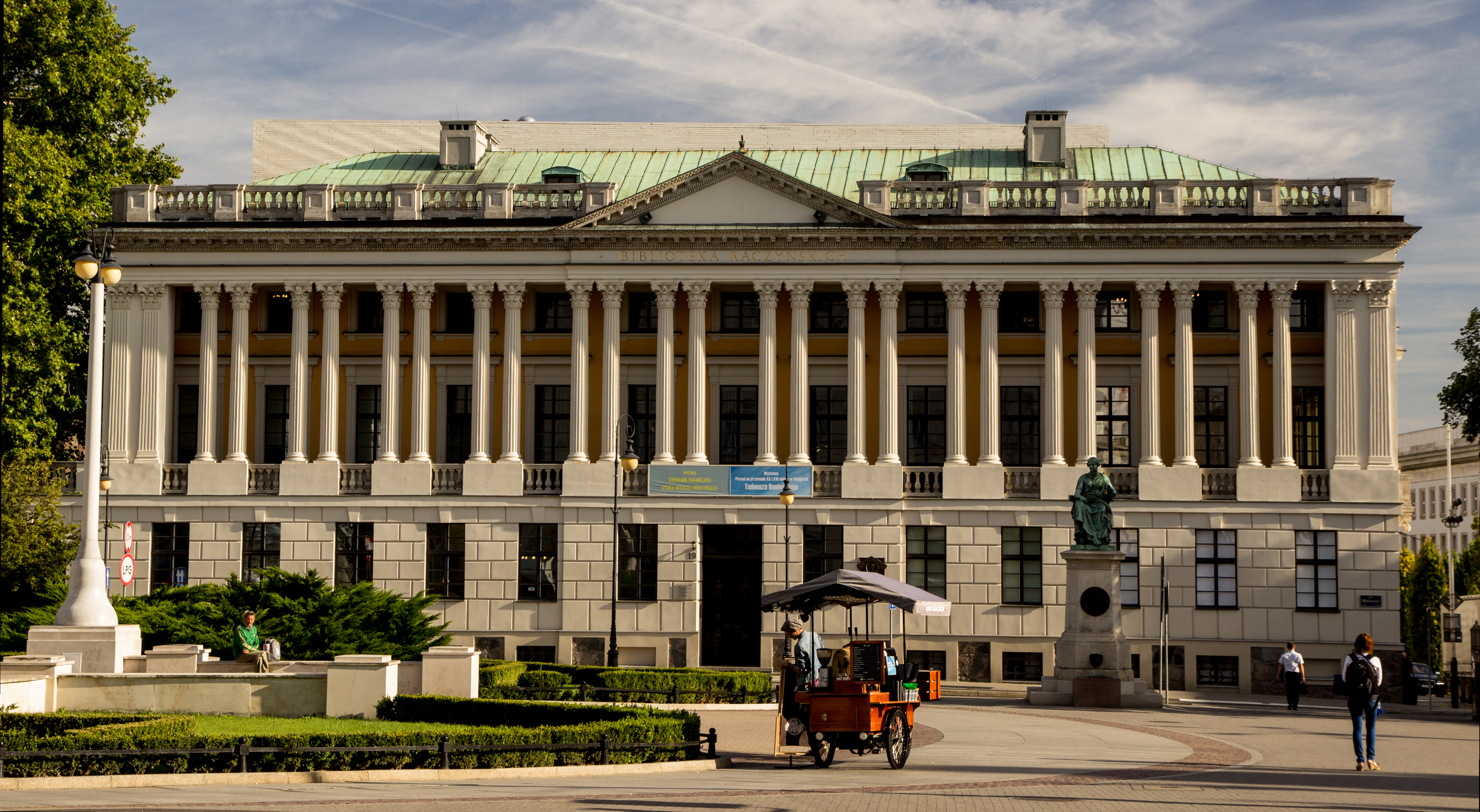
Raczyński Library

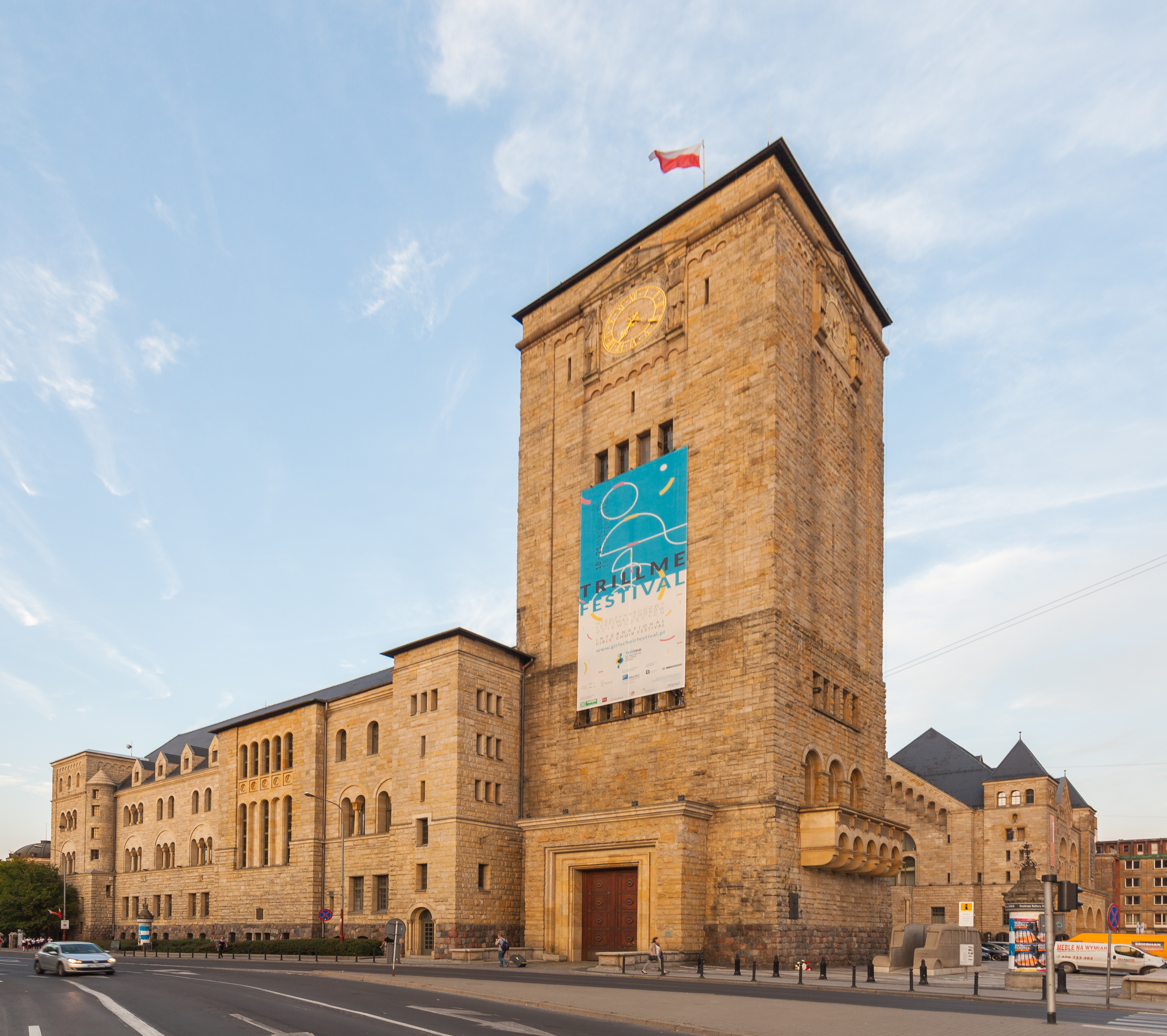
Former Imperial Castle

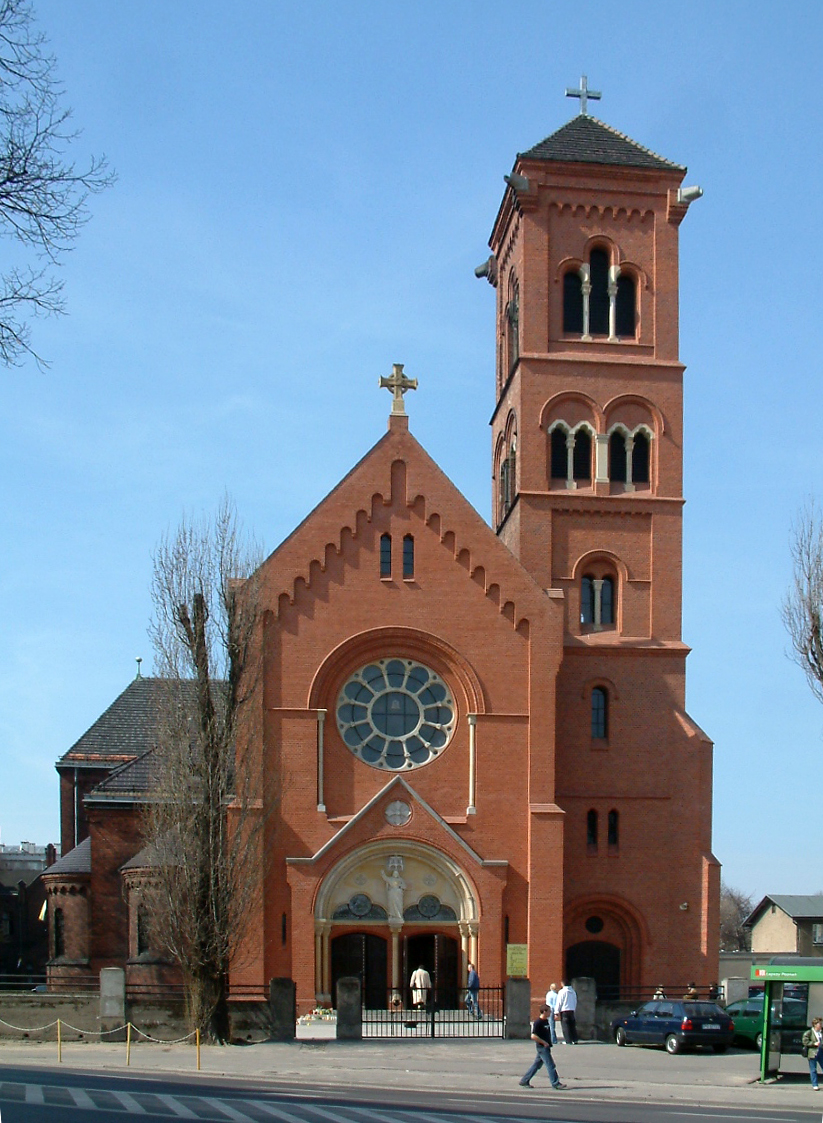
Church of the Sacred Heart of Jesus and St. Florian

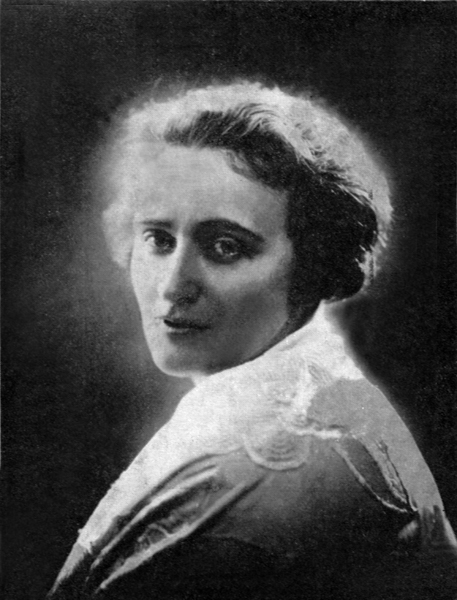
Kazimiera Iłłakowiczówna

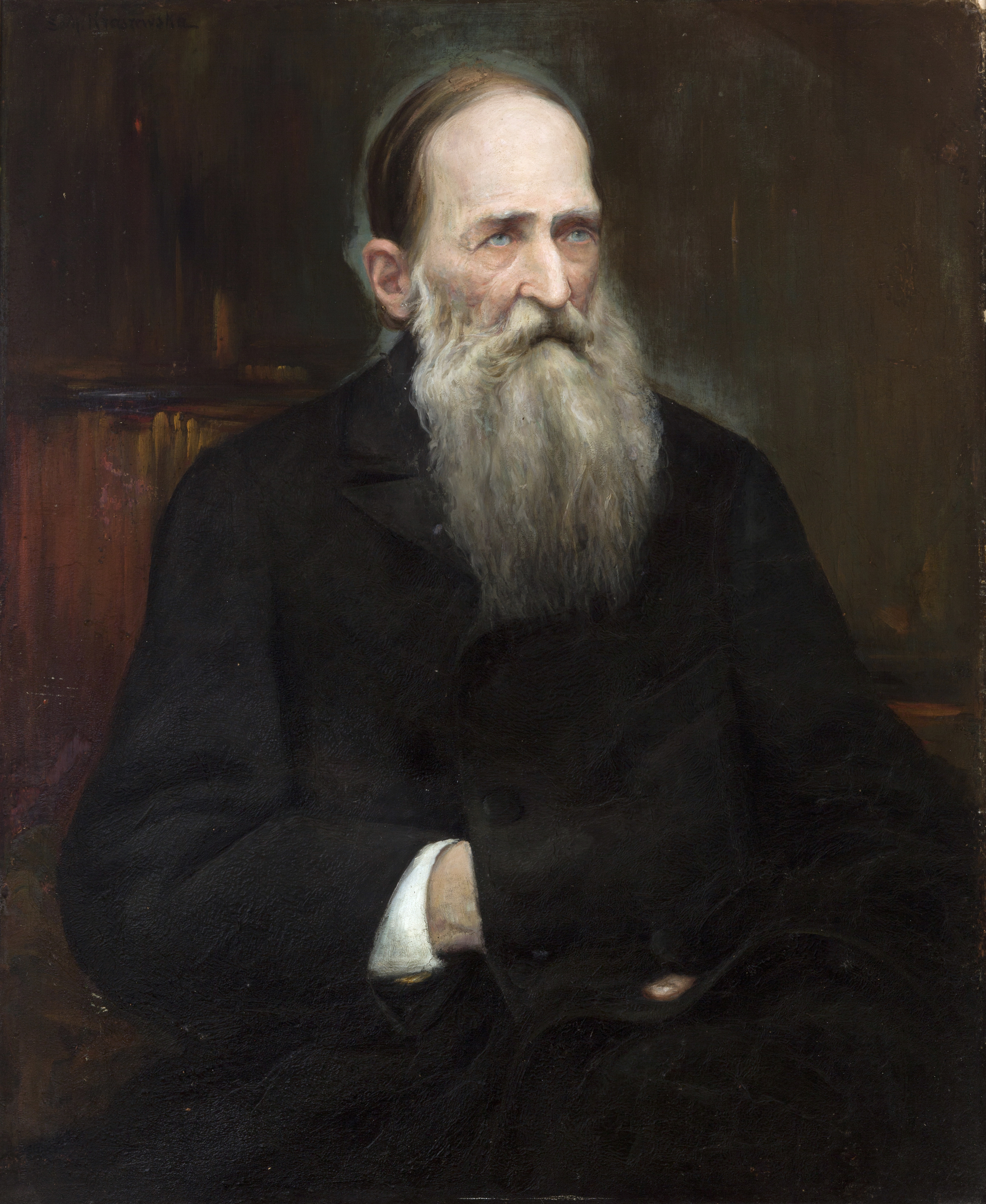
Józef Ignacy Kraszewski

The Royal-Imperial Route in Poznań (Polish: Trakt Królewsko-Cesarski w Poznaniu, German: Route der Könige und Kaiser) is a tourist walk running through the most important parts of the city and presenting the history, culture and identity of Poznań. The Route leads in a westward direction, from The Church of St. John Jerusalem behind the Wall to the Church of the Sacred Heart of Jesus and St. Florian.

The Royal–Imperial Route in Poznań is an idea of a tourist product that would combine important places and historical monuments of the city. "The Royal – Imperial Route" axis provides cultural, artistic and educational events that integrate the activities of all parties concerned and are the platform for co-operation of various entities: public administration, culture and science institutions, representatives of the academic circle, and tourist organisations. That is why "The Royal–Imperial Route" is Poznań's first complete partner project in which the City Hall motivates the other parties to work for the development of cultural tourism of the city and region.

== Thematic lines ==
- Route of history "Poland began here... – Poland began in Poznań...". The name of the theme recalls the words of Pope John Paul II, who reminded that the history of Christian Poland (and its statehood) began in Poznań, to some extent together with the European integration, or rather affiliation to the Mediterranean culture instead of Byzantine one. The thousand-year history inscribed in the areas of the old Poznań (from Ostrów Tumski to the Old Town) and the Polish state provide excellent material and inspiration to develop a tourist offer, which could be briefly described with the following sentence: in Poznań you travel to the beginnings of Poland – not only in the family context, but also in respect of the national identity.
- Route of architecture monuments "That is how Poznań was built – Route of Work and Beauty". Different architectural styles in Poznań: from Romanesque to Secession (Cathedral – Town Hall – Parish Church– Castle), and transparent development of both the urban system and cultural content, allow to guide the tourist through successive stages (cultural layers) of the city, from which the history of people who worked and lived here can be traced over the centuries.
- Artistic (Cultural) Route "Cultural inspirations – Route bustling with (cultural) life… – Entertainment/Cultural ROUTing". The artistic offer constitutes an important element of cultural tourism. Cultural programs affect the significance of the city on the map of cultural – city tourism marketing to a great extent. For that reason the elements of the integrated Tourist Product "Royal-Imperial Route in Poznań" involve many diversified product programs within this area.
- Route of Wielkopolska traditions "Not just potatoes with cottage cheese – Good Food and Fun". Emphasizing one's own local identity through presenting the customs, traditions or values to the public constitutes the only "resources" exploited for tourist purposes. Yet, presenting the tradition of Wielkopolska Region in Poznań will be a wonderful supplement to the cultural offer of the city, highlighting at the same time its genuine individual character and regionalism.

== Historic reference ==
The name of The Royal-Imperial Route has its ground in the history of the city.

"Royal" comes from the fact that Mieszko I's palatium served as a residence for the first kings of Poland, whose tombs are located in Poznań Cathedral's crypt. The cathedral is the place of burial of the following rulers:

- Mieszko I, (and his wife – Dobrawa),
- Bolesław I the Brave,
- Mieszko II,
- Casimir I the Restorer,
- Ladislaus Odonic,
- Przemysł I,
- Bolesław the Pious,
- Przemysł II.

The Royal Castle (Zamek Królewski), erected on Przemysł Hill (Góra Przemysła) at the end of the 13th century as the largest of its time in Poland, was where Polish as well as foreign kings were frequently received.

- Casimir III the Great,
- Louis I the Great,
- Jadwiga of Anjou,
- Władysław II Jagiełło,
- John I Albert
- Casimir IV Jagiellon,
- Sigismund I the Old,
- Henry of Valois,
- Sigismund III Vasa,
- John II Casimir Vasa.

Poznań was also an emperors' city:

- The first emperor to visit the city was Otto III on his way to Gniezno, where in 1000 (AD), together with the Polish sovereign, Bolesław the Brave, he offered prayers to God at the tomb of St. Adalbert, who is now the patron saint of the European Union. Henry II, Frederick I (Barbarossa) and John of Luxembourg all attempted to take Poznań. Two Tsars, Peter the Great and Alexander I, also paid state visits to the city.
- In 1806, Napoleon Bonaparte moved into the Jesuit College for few weeks, from where he commanded his army.
- The German Kaiser Wilhelm II awarded Poznań the status of "imperial-residence city". The castle erected for the Kaiser in 1910 was the last imperial residence built in Europe.

== Description of the route ==
The route shows how the city has changed and developed through the centuries and is as follows: Lake Malta – Church of St. John of Jerusalem behind the Wall – Śródka – Bishop Jordan Bridge – Ostrów Tumski (the Cathedral Island) – Chrobry Bridge – Chwaliszewo – Old Market Square – Paderewskiego Street – Wolności Square – 27 Grudnia Street – Fredry Street – Theatre Bridge – Dąbrowskiego Street – Church of the Sacred Heart of Jesus and St. Florian.

== Attractions and monuments ==
- Church of St. John of Jerusalem Outside the Walls
- Lake Malta with its sport and recreation centre
- The Maltanka Station of the narrow-gauge train in Malta Park
- Church of St. Casimir and the monastery of the Reformers
- Church of St. Margaret, the Martyr
- Former Philippine Monastery
- Bishop Jordan Bridge
- Cathedral of St. Peter and St. Paul
- Archbishop's Palace
- Church of St. Mary the Virgin in Summo
- Psalm Singers Houses
- Archdiocese Museum, Lubrański Academy Building
- Church of the Holy Heart of Jesus and Mother of God the Comforter (Jesuit Church)
- The Former Synagogue
- Workshop and Museum of Józef I. Kraszewski
- Church of the Holy Mary, the Helper of the Faithful, Salesian Society (Catherines nuns)
- "Na Piętrze" Stage (Estrada Poznańska)
- City Walls
- St. Adalberts Church with the Crypt of the Eminent Wielkopolskans
- The Citadel, Armaments Museum and Museum of the Poznań Army (formerly: the Winiary Fort)
- Church of the most Precious Blood of Christ
- City Hall – Museum /of the History of Poznań
- Weighhouse
- Bamber Woman Well
- Merchant Tenement Houses
- Wielkopolska Military Museum
- Arsenal Municipal Gallery
- The Guardhouse – Museum of the Wielkopolska Uprising 1918–1919
- Działyński Palace
- Henryk Sienkiewicz Literature Museum
- Mielżyński Palace
- Museum of Musical Instruments
- Former Royal Castle (now houses Museum of Applied Arts)
- Church of St. Anthony of Padua and Conventual Franciscan Monastery (in the cellars: a model of historic Poznań, and a model of the Piast State)
- Archaeology Museum (the former Górka Palace)
- The Ballet School andseat of the Polish Dance Theatre, Poznań Ballet (former Jesuit College)
- Bishop Stanisław's Collegiate Parish Church and former Jesuit College (now: Poznań Town Hall)
- All Saints' Church
- Ethnography Museum (the former Masonic Lodge)
- Museum of the Poznań Bambers
- Lamplighter Statue
- Church of St. Francis Seraphic and Franciscan Monastery (Monastery of the Friars Minor)
- Church of Corpus Christi
- The Old Brewery Shopping, Art and Business Centre
- Muzyczny Theatre
- Statue of Stary Marych
- St. Martin's Church
- Bazar Hotel
- National Gallery – Gallery of Paintings and Sculpture
- Raczyński Library
- Arkadia, seat of the Theatre of the Eighth Day and the City Information Centre
- Poznań University Library
- Polski Theatre
- Okrąglak Building
- Poznań Society for the Friends of the Sciences
- Church of the Holy Saviour
- Collegium Maius (former Colonization Commission building)
- Stanisław Moniuszko Grand (Wielki) Theatre
- Former Imperial Castle (now houses Zamek ("Castle") Cultural Centre)
- Monuments to Poznań Uprising of June 1956 and Adam Mickiewicz
- Adam Mickiewicz University, Collegium Minus and University Auditorium (concert hall of the Tadeusz Szeligowski Philharmonic Society of Poznań)
- New Auditorium (Aula Nova)
- Palm House
- Old Zoo
- Residence and Workshop of Kazimiera Iłłakowiczówna
- Nowy Theatre
- Art-nouveau town houses, Roosevelt Street
- Art-nouveau and timberframe buildings, Dąbrowskiego Street
- Church of the Sacred Heart of Jesus and St. Florian

== The full list of partners ==
The Royal–Imperial Route Programme is based on partnership on many levels. The Programme involves Full Partners, Associated Partners and additionally Auxiliary Partners are invited to the individual projects (e.g. schools, auxiliary self-governments, NGOs). All these institutions inform one another about their actions, projects and initiatives related to the Strategy. The Mayor of Poznań controls the proper implementation of the Strategy's provisions. All works related to the implementation of the Strategy are co-ordinated by the Programme Office which operates within the structures of the Poznań City Hall.

- "Zamek" Cultural Centre
- Estrada Poznańska Stage
- Poznań Philharmonic
- Polish Dance Theatre – Poznań Ballet
- Animation Theatre
- Nowy Theatre
- Eighth Day Theatre
- Polski Theatre
- Wielki Theatre
- "Arsenal" Municipal Gallery
- Archaeological Museum
- National Museum in Poznań
- Wielkopolska Museum of the Struggle for Independence
- State Archive in Poznań
- Raczyński Library
- Metropolitan Curia
- University of Economics
- University of Medical Sciences
- Academy of Fine Arts
- Academy of Music
- The Adam Mickiewicz University
