= New Synagogue (Poznań) =

Synagogue in Poznań, Poland

New Synagogue in Poznań
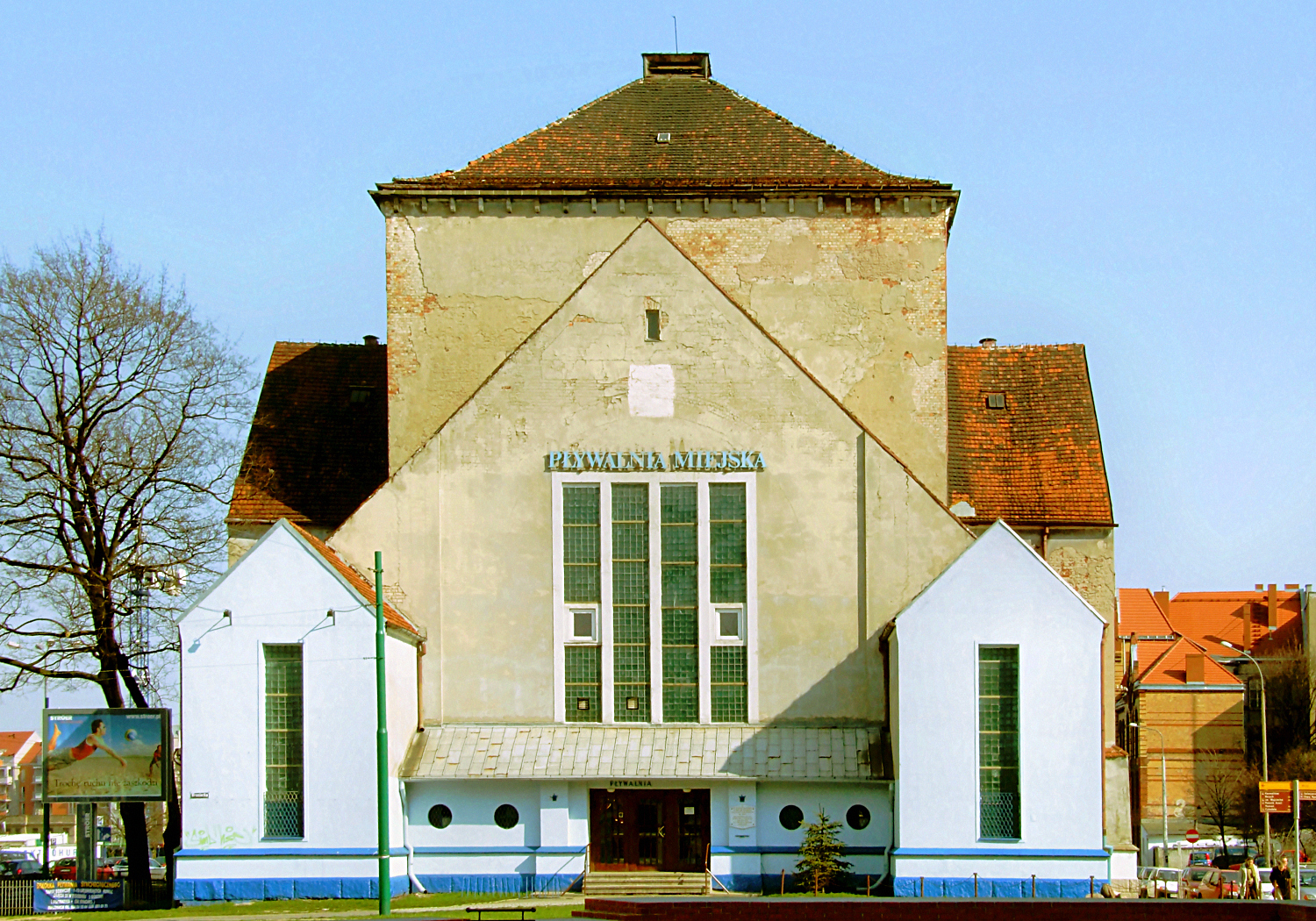
- Appearance as of 2007

- Location within Poland

Religion
- Affiliation: Judaism
- Status: closed in 1940

Location
- Location: Poznań
- Country: Poland
- Interactive map of New Synagogue in Poznań
- Coordinates: 52°24′39.0″N 16°56′06.5″E

Architecture
- Architects: Wilhelm Cremer, Richard Wolffenstein
- Completed: 1907
- Materials: brick

New Synagogue is a synagogue located in Poznań at the corner of 17 Wroniecka Street and Stawna Street, near Rabbi Akiva Eger Square. It is currently the only freestanding synagogue remaining in Poznań. During the occupation, in 1941, it was converted into an indoor swimming pool for Wehrmacht soldiers; during this renovation, the building was devastated and altered. The synagogue is one of the historical monuments and attractions on the Poznań Royal-Imperial Route tourist trail.

== History ==
=== Before the war ===
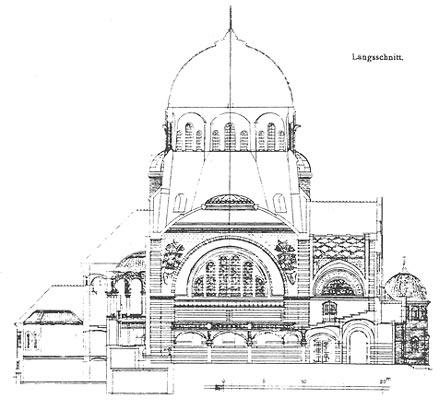
Synagogue project – longitudinal section

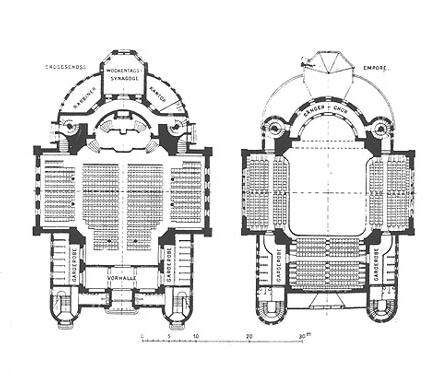
Synagogue project – ground floor and first floor plan

The first idea for building a new synagogue for the Orthodox Jewish community (in Poznań, aside from the Old Synagogue, there was also a Synagogue of the Association of Brothers of the Community) emerged in 1880. However, the building committee was established only in 1902 through the efforts of Rabbi Wolf Feilchenfeld. It was decided to construct a synagogue with a capacity for between 1,100 and 1,200 worshippers. In a competition announced in 1904, seven designs were submitted, and the project by the Berlin firm Cremer & Wolffenstein won.

The plot on which the synagogue was to be built was exchanged in 1904 with the Salomon B. Latz Foundation for three communal synagogues on Żydowska Street, which were to be demolished. Additionally, two plots belonging to the city were purchased. The cornerstone was laid on 6 May 1906.

The synagogue was constructed on a square cross-shaped plan and crowned with a dome covered in copper sheeting. Its architecture combined Romanesque Revival and Moorish Revival styles with a richly decorated interior. At its center was the Torah ark, with the bimah in front, separated from the prayer hall by an openwork balustrade.

The ceremonial opening of the synagogue took place on 5 September 1907 at 11:30 AM. Rabbi Wolf Feilchenfeld opened the doors and invited guests inside. Then, the Torah scrolls were brought in, and the Shema prayer was recited for the first time. To conclude the ceremony, Rabbi Philipp Bloch of the reformed community offered a prayer for the homeland and the emperor. The entire project, including the purchase of the plot and the construction of the synagogue, cost over 850,000 marks.

=== World War II ===
During World War II, on 1 September 1939, a ceremonial service was held in the synagogue with the participation of Poznań's rabbi, Jakub Sender, praying for the victory of the Polish Army. On September 9, the last prayer service took place at 9:00 AM.

After German forces entered Poznań, the synagogue underwent progressive devastation. On 15 April 1940, the last Star of David was removed. In the same year, it was converted into an indoor swimming pool for Wehrmacht soldiers, which gave the building its current shape. During the conversion, the interior was entirely destroyed, the structure simplified, domes dismantled, and all openings altered.

=== Post-war period ===
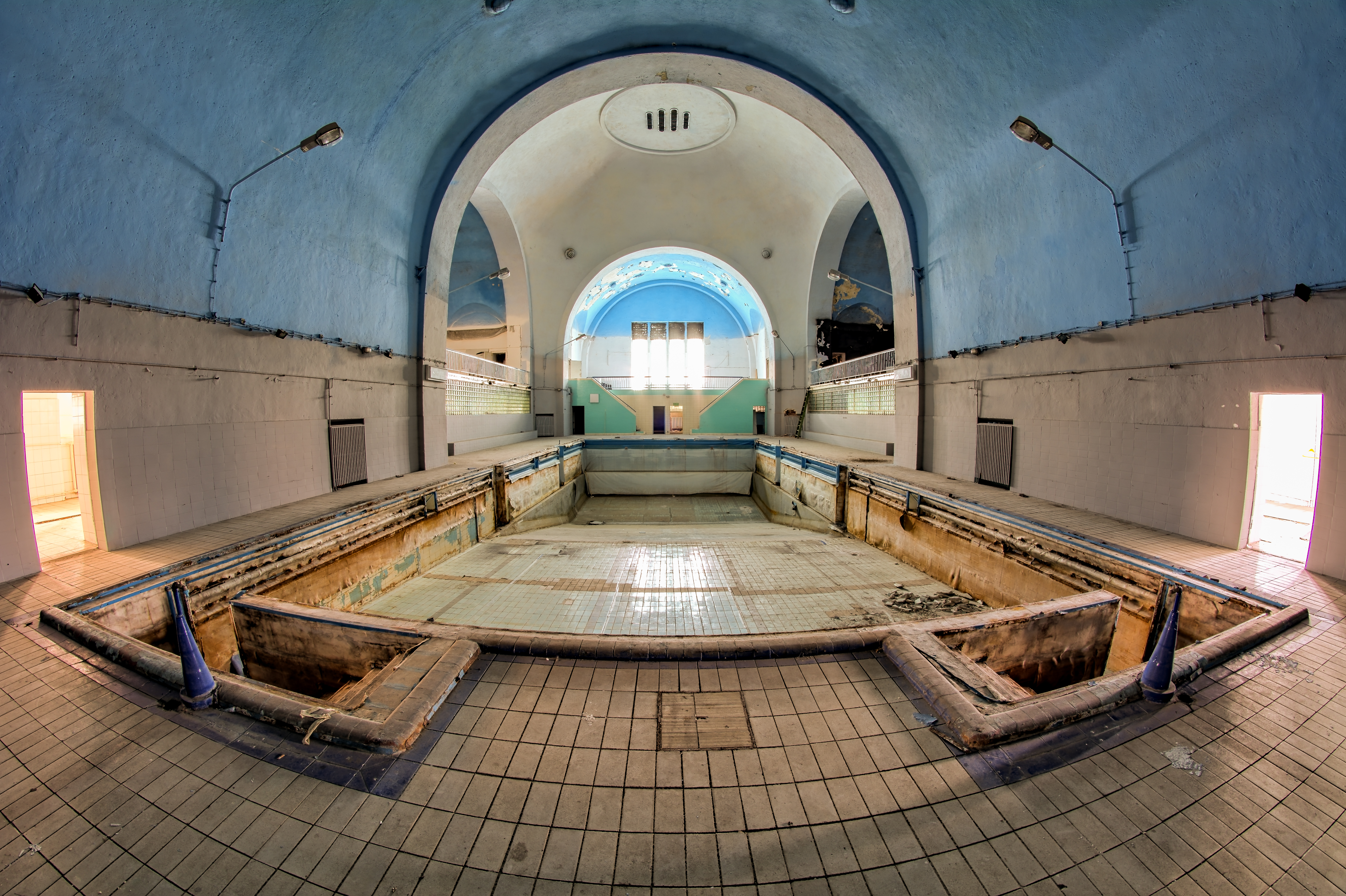
Interior of the building in 2017

The interior of the building reminded visitors of its history as a place of worship only through a commemorative plaque at the entrance, unveiled in 2004 by the Foundation for the Development of School Sports. The plaque, in Polish and English, reads:

This building, erected in 1907, was a synagogue and served as a place of worship until 1939.

An earlier commemorative plaque was installed at the synagogue in the early 1990s, thanks to the efforts of John and Daniel Marcus, funded by the For International Education corporation. Made of brass by sculptor Piotr Andruszko, it hung only for a few years before likely being stolen by scrap metal hunters.

Long-standing efforts to transform the building into a museum were hindered by unclear ownership issues, as both the Union of Jewish Religious Communities in Poland, on whose land the former synagogue is now located, and American groups representing members of the former Poznań Jewish community, sought rights to the synagogue.

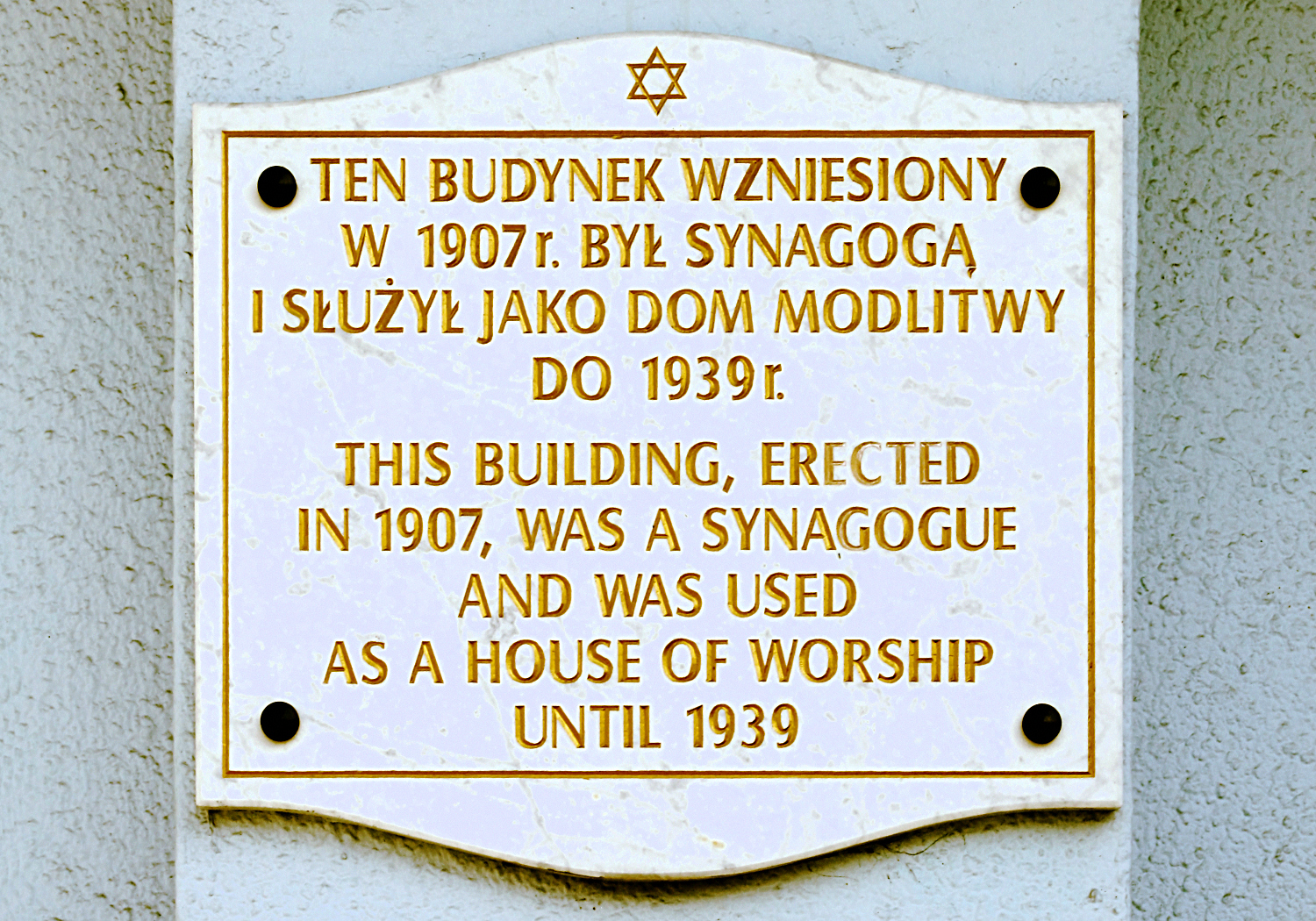
Commemorative plaque

Finally, in mid-2002, the authorities of Poznań transferred ownership of the synagogue building and the adjoining square to the Union of Jewish Religious Communities in Poland. The local community wishes to transform the synagogue into a Center for Judaism and Tolerance after renovations, but funds for this project are lacking. Since 2011, the building has ceased to function as a swimming pool.

The Jewish community plans to restore the synagogue’s pre-war appearance and create a memorial room within it dedicated to the Righteous Among the Nations honored by Yad Vashem for rescuing Jews. Additionally, the main hall would serve as a prayer area and house the Jewish Theater. However, the building has yet to be officially registered as a historic site, which restricts fundraising for its renovation.

In March 2007, a large Star of David appeared above the "Municipal Swimming Pool" sign on the synagogue’s façade, painted by Poznań-based traveler Maciej Pastwa and Irena Herszkowicz. The authors explained that the star symbolized a reawakening of memory regarding the building's true purpose. The Poznań Jewish community board was outraged by the act, reported it to the police as unauthorized, and had the star painted over within a week.

In May 2007, students from the University of Fine Arts in Poznań conducted a voluntary and free inventory of the synagogue.

In December 2023, city authorities passed a local development plan permitting the synagogue building to be raised to a height of 50 meters, potentially for apartments or a hotel. Despite attempts to repeal this zoning plan, it remained in effect. On 24 January 2024, Greater Poland Voivode Agata Sobczyk announced that the National Institute of Cultural Heritage had issued a positive opinion on including the synagogue in the heritage register. Nevertheless, on 1 February 2024, an inspector from the Municipal Heritage Conservator’s Office reported that part of the roof covering had been removed from the building. The demolition was halted. In February 2024, the Office of the Greater Poland Voivodeship Heritage Conservator stated that "there is a strong likelihood that the synagogue will be recognized as a historic site". However, they noted that after considering comments and suggestions from all parties, "it may turn out that the building will not be added to the register".

=== Dispute over the synagogue ===
In early 2006, Marcin Libicki, a Member of the European Parliament from the Law and Justice party, proposed demolishing the synagogue and redeveloping the land on which it stood.

According to him, the city should buy the synagogue building, which he considered to be devoid of value, from the Jewish Religious Community and demolish it, redeveloping the land in accordance with the project to restore the city walls and other revitalization plans for this part of the Poznań Old Town. Libicki noted that the synagogue was part of the German Kulturkampf policy, intended to limit the influence of Polishness and Catholicism in Poznań.

Marcin Libicki's proposal provoked significant controversy, a wave of protests, and shock among members of the local Jewish community, city authorities, and historians from Poznań. Poznań's Mayor, Ryszard Grobelny, declared that the demolition of the former synagogue was unacceptable, and that the city could not afford to purchase it for an amount that would allow the community to create a place of worship and cultural activity.

=== Atlantis, 9.09.1939, Alfabet ===
One of the individuals involved in the effort to preserve the New Synagogue in Poznań is Janusz Marciniak, a painter and interdisciplinary artist, professor at the University of Fine Arts in Poznań. His installations and performances in the submerged synagogue were a form of memory about the Jewish chapter in the history of Poznań and an attempt to solidify the symbolic function of the building as the only self-standing Holocaust monument in this part of Europe. Janusz Marciniak realized three projects: Atlantis (2004), 9.09.1939 (2005), and Alfabet (2006).

Atlantis (an installation of blue candles arranged in the shape of the Star of David on water) accompanied the Meditation for Peace – a performance by the Academic Choir conducted by Jacek Sykulski as part of the VII Day of Judaism celebrations (15 January 2004). The installation 9.09.1939, made of candles on water, recreated the fragment of the star arrangement above the synagogue on the date and time of the last service. The installation was shown during the VIII Day of Judaism (16 January 2005) and was combined with a performance by the Choir of the Synagogue under the White Stork from Wrocław.

The Alfabet performance, created for the IX Day of Judaism (15 January 2006) and presented during the XVI International Theater Malta Festival Poznań (4 July 2006), was a continuation of the mystery play for those who once prayed in this place. In the first version of the performance, Edward Lubaszenko performed, and in the second, Aleksander Machalica. The Atlantis and Alfabet projects were realized with the help of the European Association for Jewish Culture and the Signum Foundation.

=== Bar mitzvah underwater ===
From 1 to 2 May 2007, an experimental happening was filmed inside the synagogue, created by Noam Braslavski, an Israeli artist living in Berlin. The film was produced in collaboration with the University of Fine Arts in Poznań and performers.

The aim of the film was to recreate rituals in the synagogue underwater. In the pool, three ceremonies were staged: a bar mitzvah, a Jewish wedding, and kiddush. The actors in the film were dressed as Orthodox Jews. The men wore black hats to which fake payots made of artificial beard were attached, white shirts, black pants, and a short cloth resembling a tallit. The women wore black, loose skirts and wide, short-sleeved shirt blouses.

=== Synagogue redevelopment project ===
In early July 2007, a preliminary project to transform the synagogue into the Center for Judaism and Dialogue was published. The authors were architects Stefan Bajer from the Assmann Polska Design Group and Krzysztof Kwiatkowski from the University of Fine Arts in Poznań.

The project proposed a complete reconstruction and the restoration of the synagogue’s pre-war appearance. The only innovation would be a glass dome, about 40 meters high, housing a café and a viewing terrace. Other planned facilities included a concert-theater hall with seating for 750 people, the Museum of the History of Poznań Jews, a hall for the Righteous Among the Nations, a restaurant, temporary exhibition rooms, a library, an educational and information center, a bookstore, a shop, and a Synagogue of the Week, to be used by the Poznań Jewish community. For larger services and events, the synagogue’s small space was to be expanded using movable elements, incorporating the entire concert hall.

The construction of the center was to proceed in two stages: the first would involve adding a new part of the building, while the second would involve remodeling the existing part and adding the glass dome. Due to the investment cost of 50 million PLN, the plans were not realized, and before 2020, the building was sold to the Warsaw-based company Omers.

=== Tzadik Poznań Festival ===
From 9 to 11 August 2007, the Tzadik Poznań Festival took place, marking the first large cultural event in the Poznań synagogue. The festival was inspired by, among others, the poem Miasto (City) by Ryszard Krynicki. The organizers of the festival included the International Theatre Festival MALTA Foundation and the Multikulti Project.

On August 9, pianist Jamie Saft performed, accompanied by Bester Quartet. Other performances included Koby Israelite Band, Bester Quartet, and Lautari. On August 10, the poetic performance Słowo święte, słowo przeklęte (Sacred Word, Cursed Word) took place, featuring Ewa Lipska, Ryszard Krynicki, and Piotr Matywiecki, enriched by improvisations from Mateusz and Marek Pospieszalski.

=== Virtual synagogue ===
In May 2008, Krzysztof Kwiatkowski, from the Packaging Design Studio at the Poznań University of Fine Arts, published a two-year project in which he created a virtual reconstruction of the synagogue. His inspiration came from the work of German scholars who used a similar approach to reconstruct synagogues destroyed in Germany during Kristallnacht.

The virtual reconstruction was based on several black-and-white photos, a color photograph of the synagogue obtained in Berlin, and a few drawings, which had helped a design firm win the competition to build the synagogue. In the future, the artist plans to create a virtual museum where anyone will be able to visit the building. He also intends to digitally reconstruct other, now non-existent synagogues in Poznań.

=== Architecture ===
The synagogue's masonry, oriented, and free-standing building was constructed on a Greek cross plan, with the eastern arm ending in an apse. Additional rooms surrounded the apse from the north, east, and south, forming a semi-circular eastern façade. The western arm was extended by a three-part vaulted vestibule, preceded by a recessed entrance. To the north and south, the western wing was flanked by cloakrooms and staircases placed in semi-circular avant-corps.

The building's facades were decorated with oriental motifs. The interior was covered by barrel vaults, and at the intersection of the arms, there was a dome with a diameter of 17 meters and a height of 20 meters. Smaller domes were placed at the building's corners. The walls were adorned with decorative polychromy featuring geometric and plant motifs. In the center, beneath the dome on the eastern wall, there was a richly decorated Torah ark, accessed by semi-circular stairs located on all sides. The entire area was separated from the rest of the hall by a latticework balustrade decorated with marble. The synagogue had 1,300 seating places: 700 for men and 600 for women (in two side matronea).
