= Church of Saint John of Jerusalem outside the walls =

Roman Catholic parish church in Poznań, Poland

Coordinates: 52°24′34″N 16°57′32″E

Church of Saint John of Jerusalem outside the walls Kościół św. Jana Jerozolimskiego za murami (in Polish)
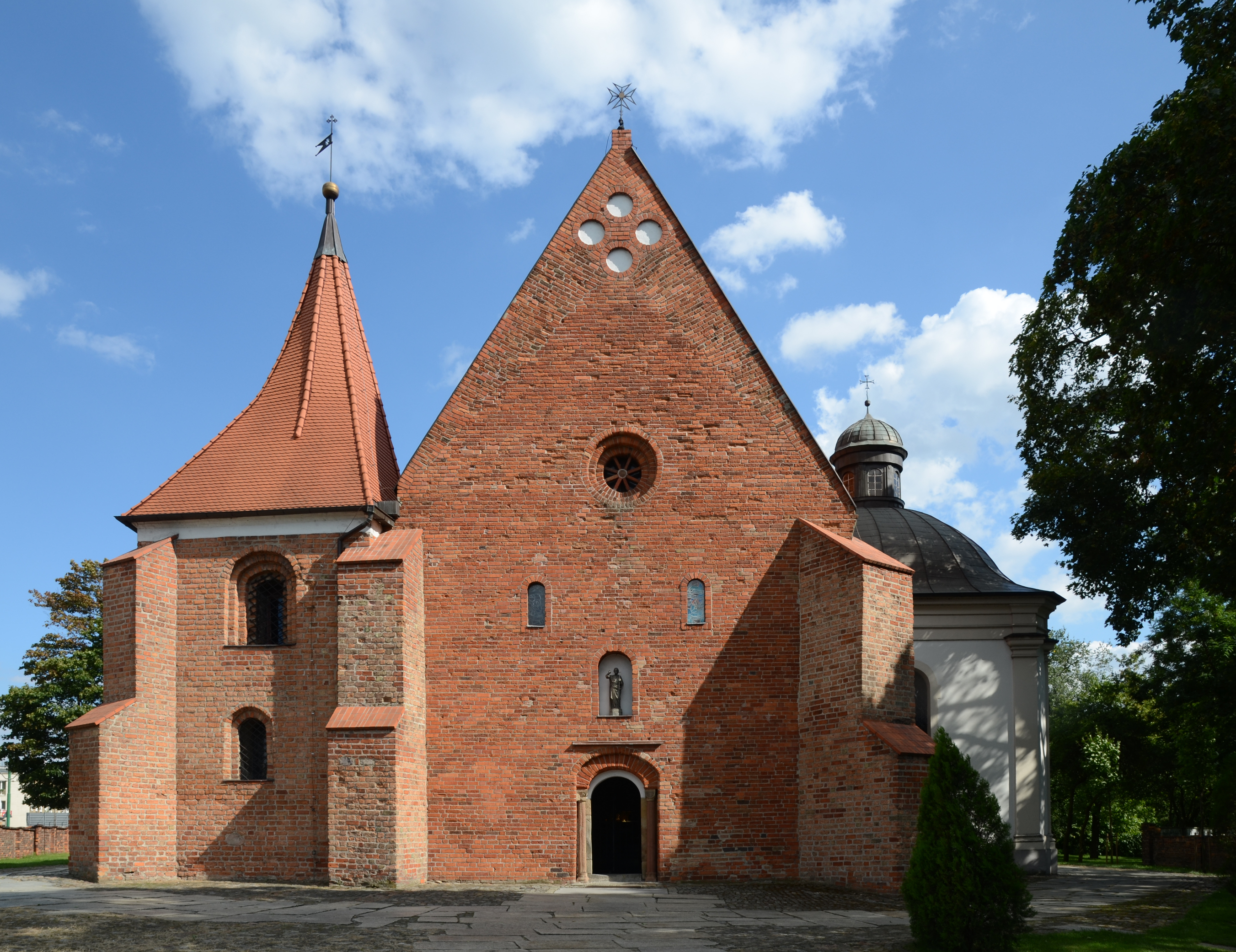

Religion
- Affiliation: Roman Catholic
- Diocese: Nowe Miasto

Location
- Location: Poznań, Poland
- Interactive map of Church of Saint John of Jerusalem outside the walls Kościół św. Jana Jerozolimskiego za murami (in Polish)

Architecture
- Style: Romanesque, Brick Gothic, Baroque (chapel)
- Completed: 11th century
- Materials: Brick, Stone

The Church of Saint John of Jerusalem outside the walls (Polish: Kościół św. Jana Jerozolimskiego za murami) is a Roman Catholic parish church in the city of Poznań in western Poland. The original church on this site was built at the end of the 11th century, making it one of the oldest churches within the present boundaries of Poznań.

It stands on the south-eastern corner of the Rondo Śródka roundabout, between the neighbourhoods of Śródka and Komandoria, within the city's Nowe Miasto district. It is close to the north-west corner of Lake Malta. The epithet "Outside the Walls" refers to the fact that it lay outside Poznań's medieval defensive walls.

The church is dedicated to St. John of Jerusalem (John the Baptist), the patron saint of the Knights Hospitallers, to whom the church belonged until 1832 (and to whom it has now been restored).

== History ==
A church, dedicated to St. Michael, stood on the site near the fork of the roads leading to Śrem and Giecz at the end of the 11th century. According to Jan Długosz, on 6 May 1170 Duke Mieszko III and the bishop of Poznań set up a pilgrims' hospice there. In 1187 the church and hospice were granted to the Order of the Knights Hospitallers. Around the beginning of the 13th century the Order began construction of a new church, which is essentially the building which survives to this day. It was one of the first brick-built churches in Poland. At some point before 1288 the church was re-dedicated to the Order's patron saint, St. John of Jerusalem (John the Baptist), although the older name was still sometimes used as least until 1360. The Order was also granted land to the east and south of the church, now occupied by the Komandoria district and Lake Malta. Both these names are connected with the Hospitallers: komandoria means a commandry of that Order, while the island of Malta was once the Order's home.

Following fire damage in the late 15th century the church was rebuilt in Gothic style. Around 1512 an aisle, a tower and a timber ceiling were added. In 1736 a Baroque chapel was added on the south side. In 1832 the Prussian government abolished the Order, and the church became a parish church. During the Second World War it was used for storage, and it was damaged during the Battle of Poznań in 1945. It was restored in 1948, with attempts to restore the original Romanesque architectural style.

In 1992 the church was returned to the Order of Knights Hospitallers (the parish provost is also the chaplain of the Order). The Order has opened an ambulatory care centre for cancer patients there.

== Description of the building ==
The church has buttressed walls, two naves and a pitched roof. The tower, only slightly higher than the nave, has an asymmetric roof. The Baroque chapel on the east side (Holy Cross Chapel, kaplica Śwętego Krzyża) has a cupola with a lantern.

The oldest, Romanesque, walls are built in Flemish bond. The Romanesque western portal has two columns: that on the left dates from the 11th century (it stands "upside down", with its base upwards), while the right-hand column is a reconstruction. Above the portal is a figure of John the Baptist. On the same wall is a Romanesque rosetta window. An original Romanesque window can also be seen on the eastern wall of the chancel (it became visible after a more modern vestry was demolished). The church is topped with a Maltese cross.

The remains of an old church cemetery can be found within the walls surrounding the church.

== Interior ==
Both naves have a stellar vault from the late Gothic period. The chancel has a late Romaesque cruciform vault. The vaults display frescos painted in 1949 by Stanisław Teisseyre.

The chancel has a late Gothic triptych made in a local workshop around 1520, and significantly restored after sustaining damage in the Second World War. It shows the sacra conversazione between the Virgin Mary, John the Baptist and Saint Stanisław. With the wings closed it shows the martyrdom of St. Stanisław and the beheading of John the Baptist and Saint John the Evangelist.

Another altar can be found in the aisle. In its centre is a picture of the mourning of Christ, many times repainted.

In Holy Cross Chapel is a Baroque altar from 1737. In its centre is a crucifix from the mid-17th century, once standing on the road to Śródka, and regarded as miraculous. It is normally covered by a picture of the Sacred Heart of Jesus. At the sides are figures of John the Baptist and St. Stanisław. Beneath the chapel is a crypt in which two Hospitaller commanders are buried: Michał Stanisław Dąbrowski (died 1740) and Andrzej Marcin Miaskowski (died 1832).

A sandstone font stands in the aisle, dating from 1522. It is decorated with tracery and a picture of the Baptism in the Jordan, made in 1615.

At the western end of the nave is a 19th-century choir, above which is a neo-Gothic organ front made in 1948.
