= Śródka, Poznań =

Historic district of Poznań, Poland

Coordinates: 52.4108°N 16.9538°E

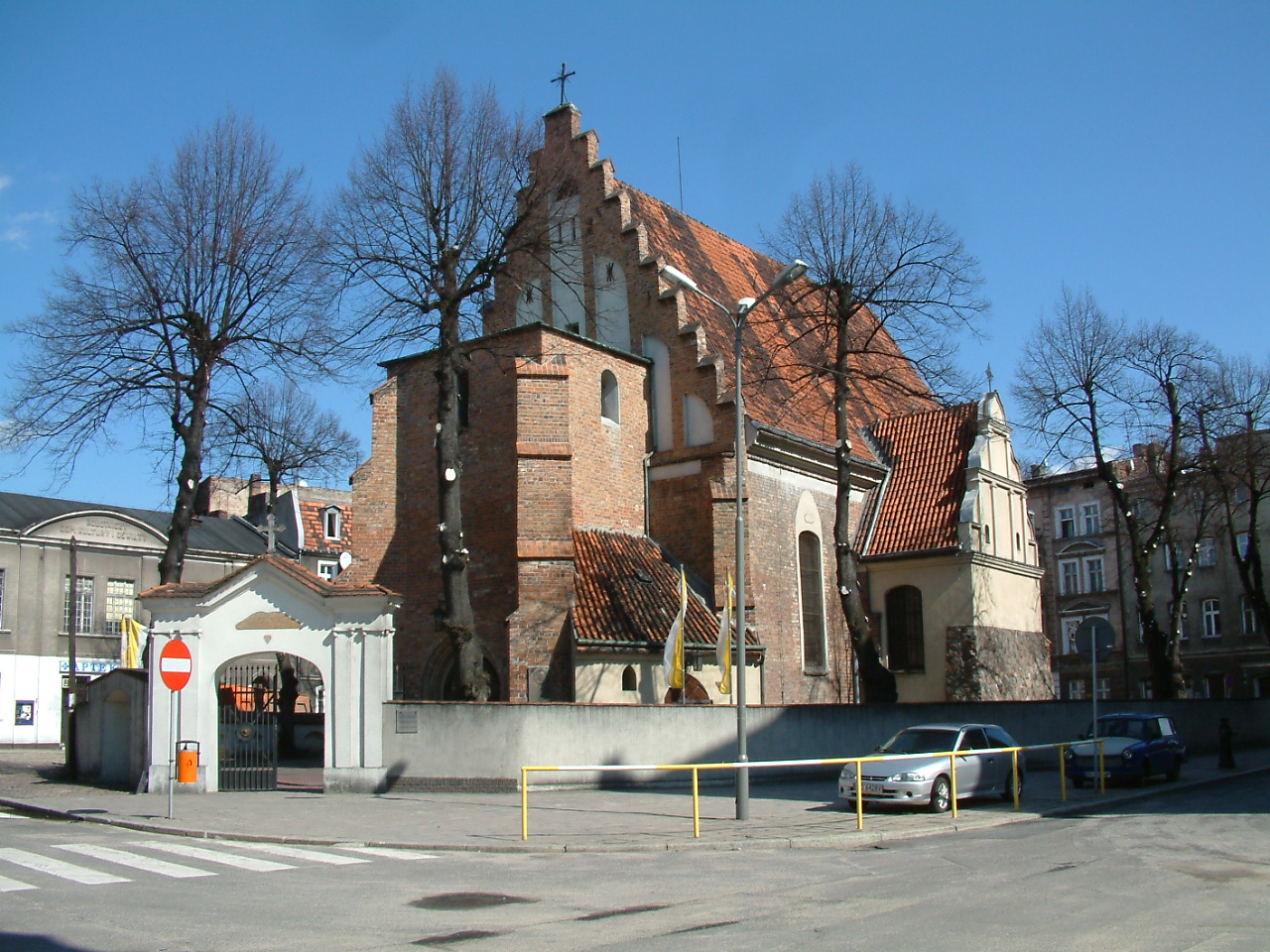
St. Margaret's Church

Śródka [ˈɕrutka] is a historic neighbourhood of the city of Poznań in western Poland. It lies on the right bank of the Warta river, opposite the island of Ostrów Tumski where the city's cathedral is situated. It belonged to the former district of Nowe Miasto; in the current administrative division of Poznań, Ostrów Śródka is part of an osiedle which also includes Ostrów Tumski and the neighbourhoods of Zawady and Komandoria.

Coat of arms of Śródka

Archaeologists have found evidence of settlement in Śródka which may date from the ninth century. By 1231 Sródka was a ducal settlement, and in 1288 it was granted to the bishops of Poznań. It obtained town rights in the 15th century (Ostrówek, at its western end, was a separate town), and was incorporated into the city of Poznań in 1800. Its name is related to the Polish word środa ("Wednesday"), this being the day of the weekly market once held there.

The district is centred on Rynek Śródecki (Śródka Marketplace), in the centre of which stands the 16th-century St. Margaret's church. On the north-west corner of the square is an Oratory of Saint Philip Neri, founded in 1665, the present building dating from the late 18th century. The small Malta cinema, sharing its name with nearby Lake Malta, was housed in the building next to the Oratory on the north side of the square, until its closure on 10 May 2010 (it is due to reopen in new premises in Jeżyce later in the year).

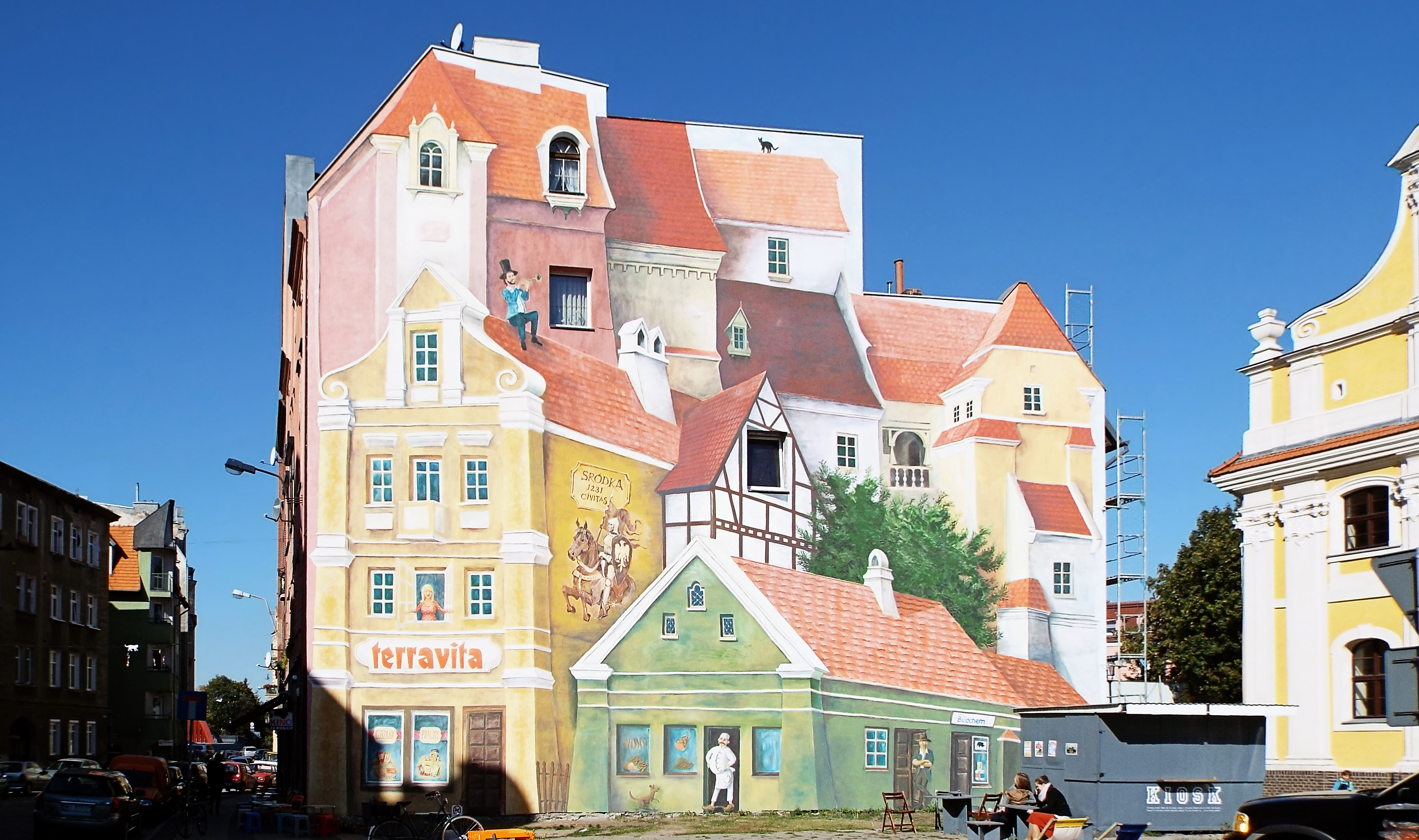
Śródka Tale Mural in 2015

Since 2015 the Śródka Tale Mural painted on one of its tenement houses, makes up an important landmark of Śródka Marketplace. The mural refers to a history of the neighbourhood and features some local characters such as a butcher, a trumpeter as well as Władysław Odonic, the Duke of all Greater Poland.

On the eastern edge of Śródka is the church of St. Kazimierz, built for the Franciscans in 1685, with a monastery added in 1704. The monastery was dissolved by the Prussian authorities in 1794. The church currently belongs to the Polish branch of the Old Catholic Church, and the former monastery building is used as a school for the deaf.

A main road runs just south of Śródka, connecting it with Ostrów Tumski and central Poznań to the west, and with the roundabout called Rondo Śródka at the district's south-east corner. This road was built in the 1960s, with the demolition of some buildings on the southern edge of Śródka. Since 7 December 2007 Śródka has also been linked with Ostrów Tumski by a footbridge ("Bishop Jordan's Bridge", Most biskupa Jordana), constructed from the former main span of the now reconstructed St. Roch road bridge which crosses the Warta further south. A bridge previously existed in this place until 1969.

The ancient Church of St. John of Jerusalem Outside the Walls lies on the south-east corner of Rondo Śródka, just outside the district of Śródka itself.

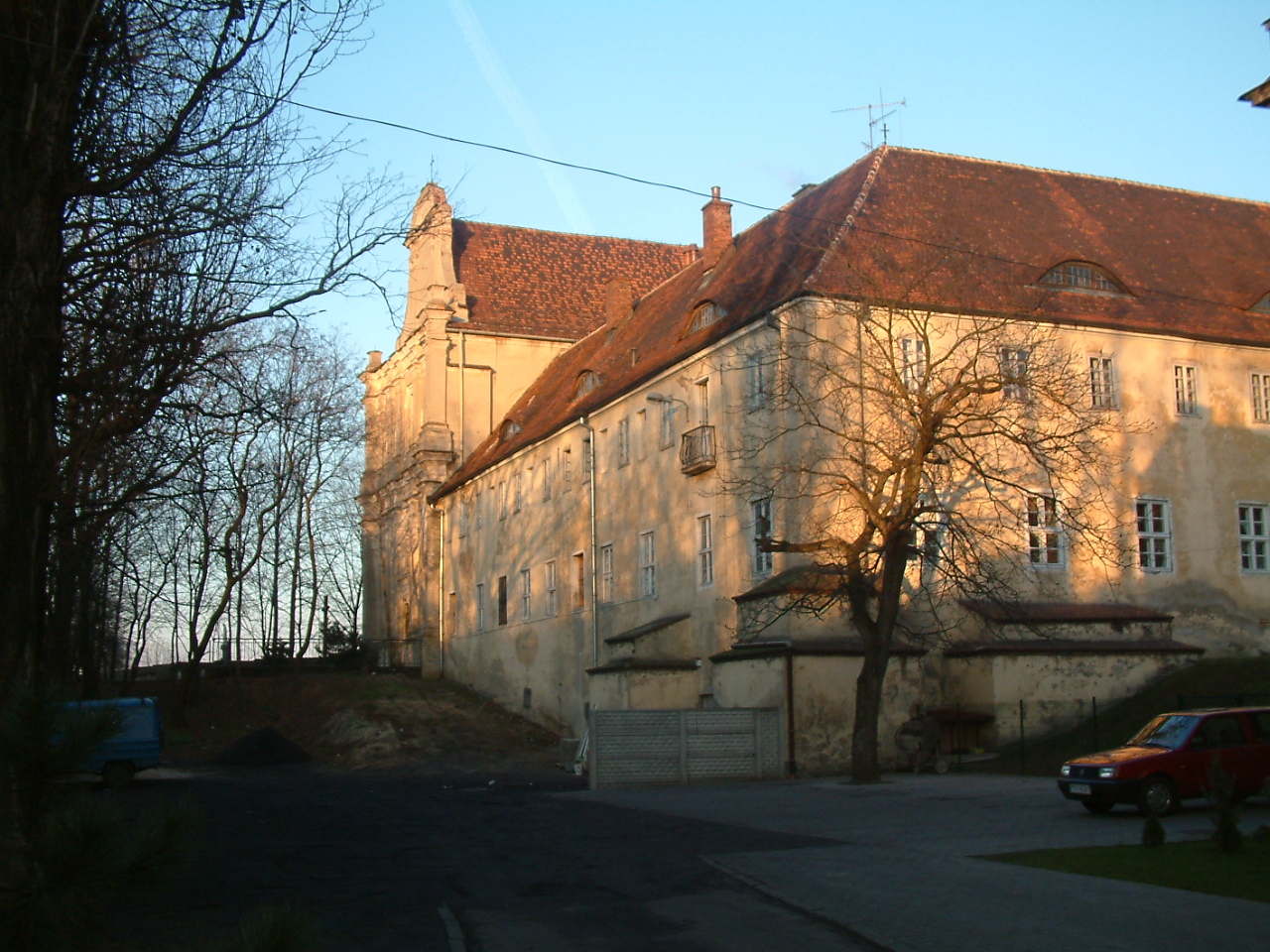
Church of St. Kazimierz, with the former monastery in the foreground

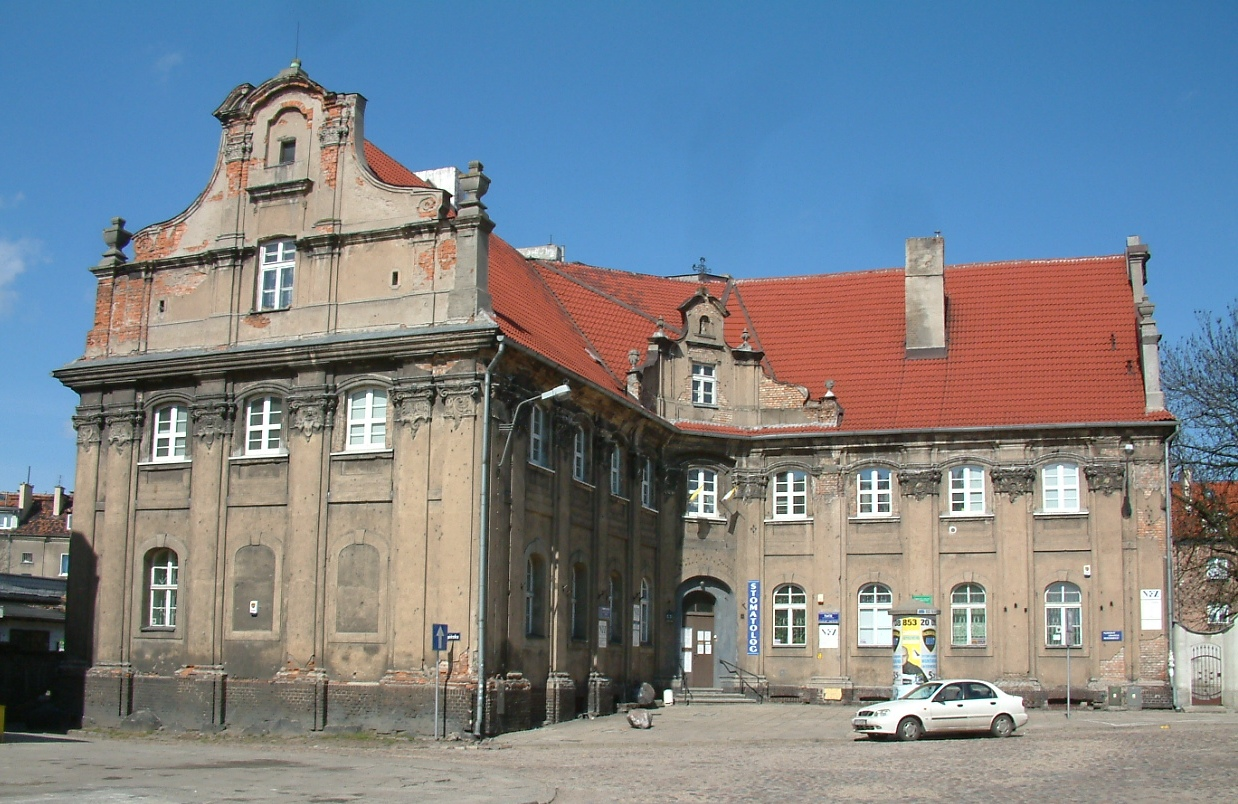
Oratory of Saint Philip Neri

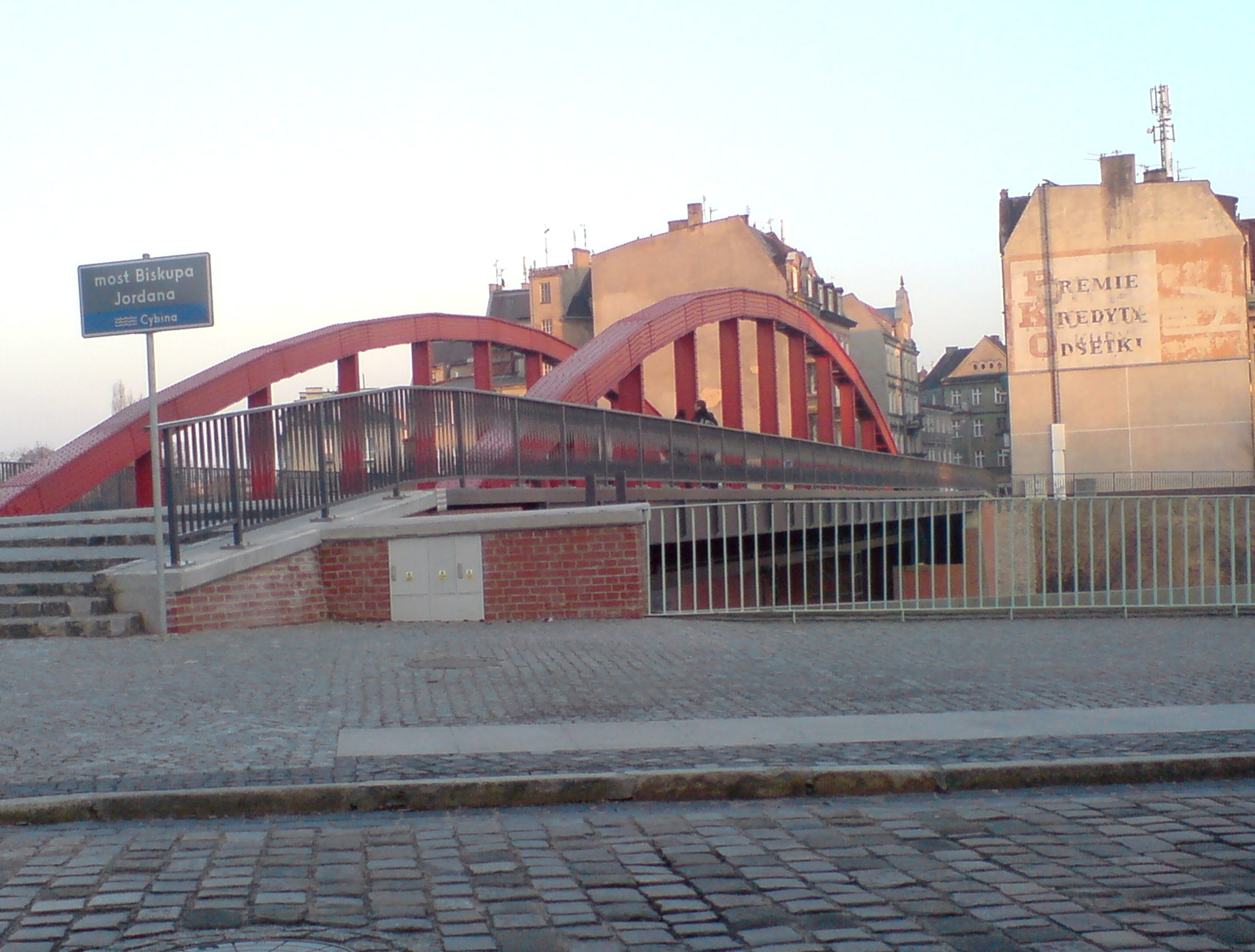
Bishop Jordan's bridge, viewed from Ostrów Tumski towards Śródka

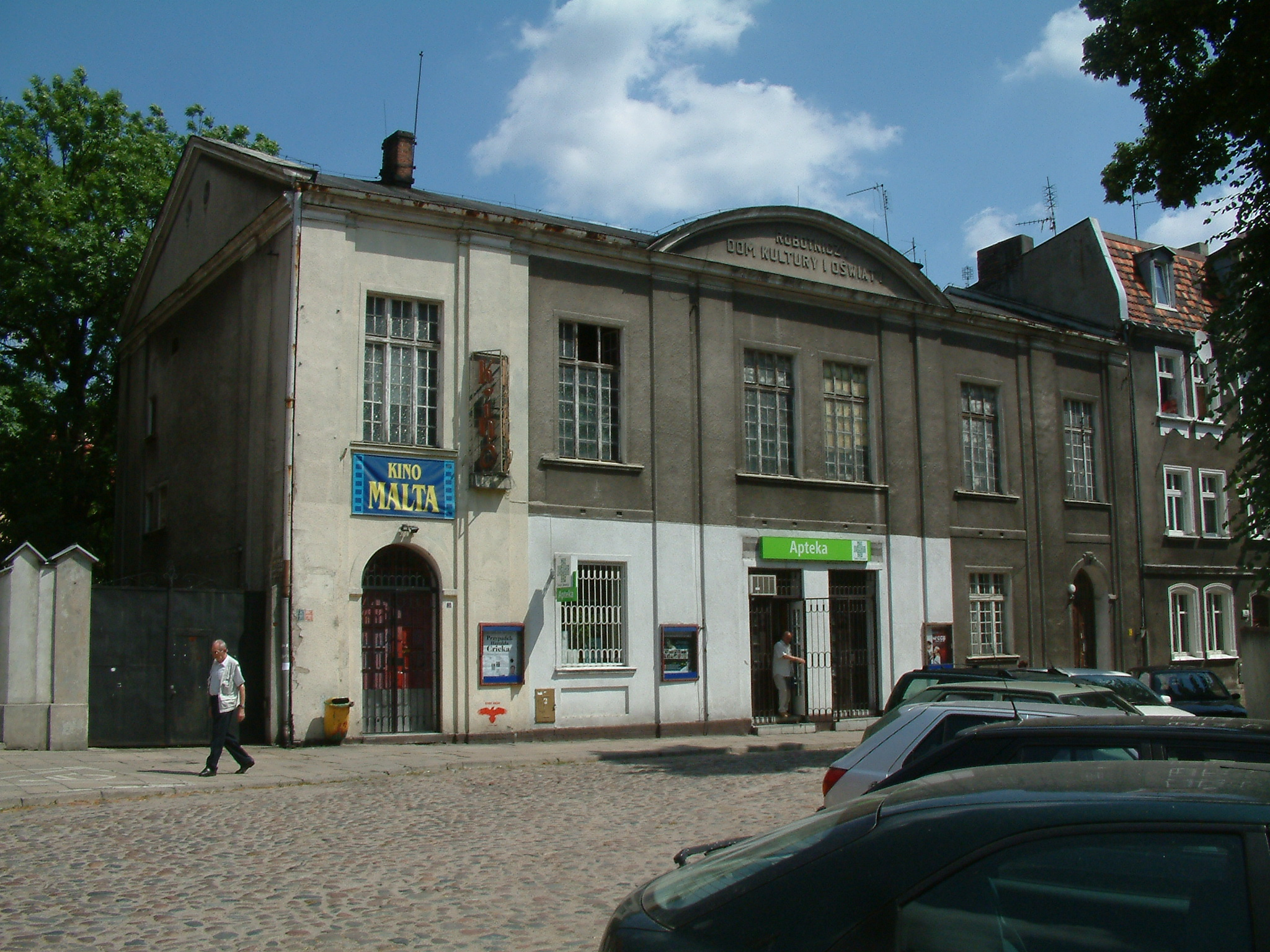
The Malta cinema prior to its closure in 2010

== See also ==
- History of Poznań
