= Estate of Father Jerzy Popiełuszko =

Coordinates: 52.23084°N 16.51507°E

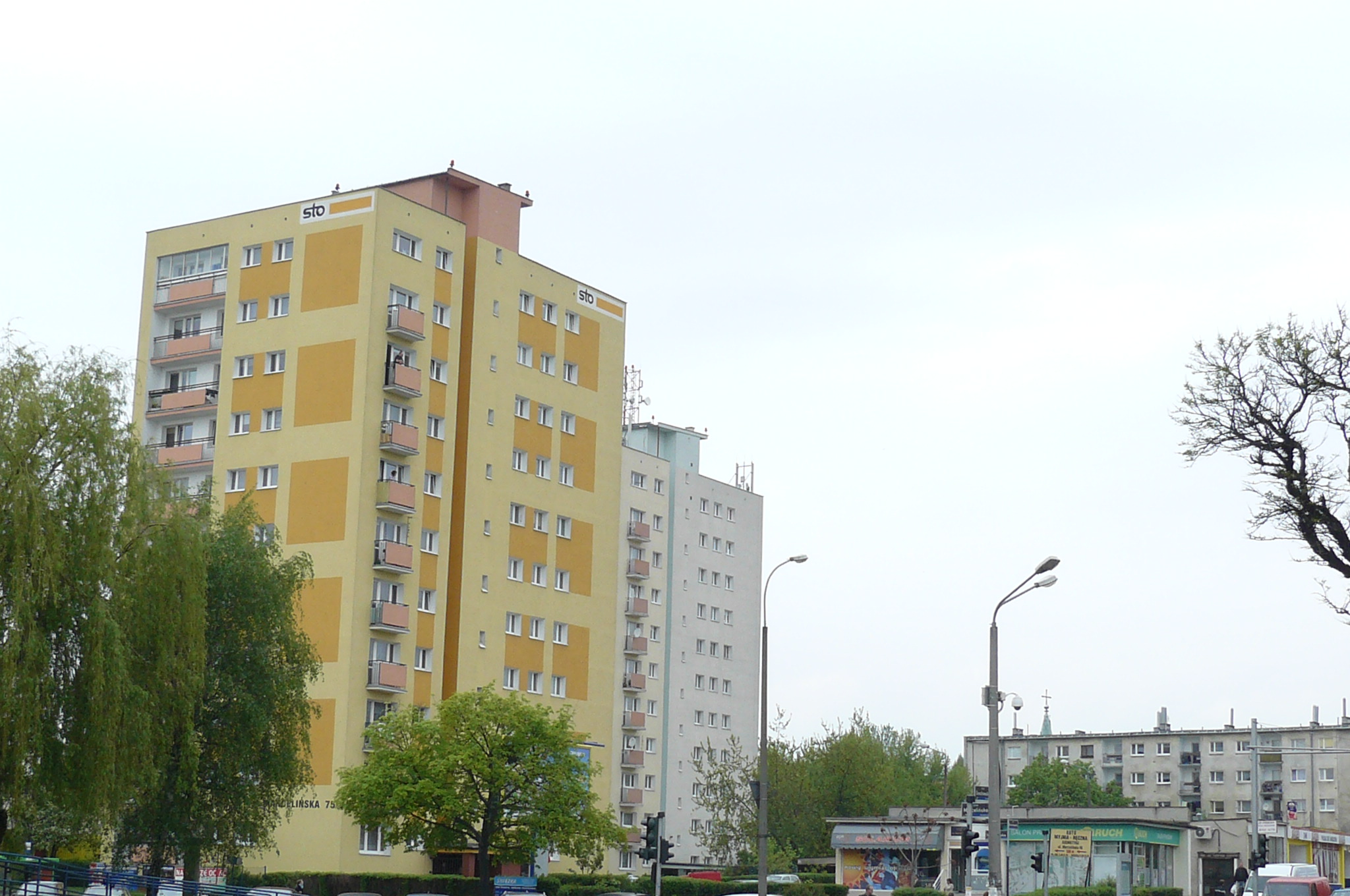
Estate of Father Jerzy Popiełuszko

The Father Jerzy Popiełuszko Housing Estate (formerly the Karol Świerczewski Housing Estate and the Grunwald Housing Estate) is a residential estate in Poznań and also part of the City Information System, located in the local government district of Grunwald Północ in Grunwald. It was the first large housing estate in Poznań.

== Borders ==
According to the Municipal Information System, the area unit of the Rev. Jerzy Popiełuszko Housing Estate is located within the following boundaries:

- from the east: Grochowska Street,
- from the south: Marcelińska Street,
- from the west: Bułgarska Street,
- from the north: Bukowska Street.

== Characteristics and objects ==
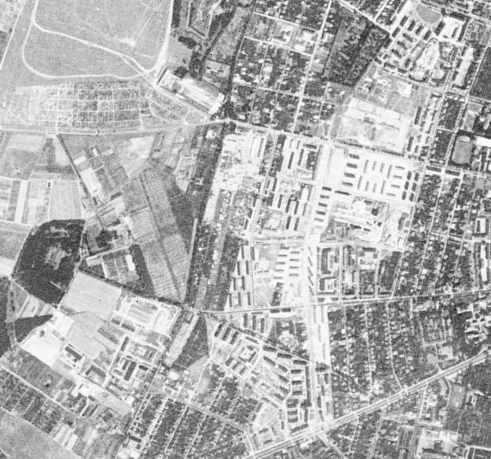
Satellite image of blocks of flats under construction in Grunwald (1965)

It is a housing estate of multi-family blocks built between 1958 and 1970, between Bukowska Street (to the north), Grochowska Street (to the east), Marcelińska Street (to the south) and Bułgarska Street (to the west), designed by Mirosława Dworzańska, Bogdan Celichowski, Włodzimierz Wojciechowski, Zdzisław Podoski and Wojciech Kasprzycki for 1,700 flats. Colloquially, the estate is considered to include all blocks of flats in this area, including those east of Grochowska Street.

The housing estate, as an auxiliary unit of local government, was established on 28 September 1993. It covers an area of 1.2 km² and has a population of approximately 12,000. The buildings consist mainly of multi-storey blocks of flats from the 1960s, supplemented by commercial and service facilities. In addition, St. George's Church is located in this area. Until 2009, there was also an original monument to Karol Świerczewski on Grochowska Street in the form of a several-metre-long bayonet stuck in the ground (accompanied by smaller structures in the vicinity). It was demolished amid controversy – protests were raised by, among others, the Walter Civic Movement. The monument was created in 1975 and was the work of Ryszard Skupin and Anna Krzymańska.

The dominant feature of the complex is the twelve-storey building at 49a Grochowska Street (currently in the Kasztelanów district), constructed from so-called Żerań brick (concrete wall elements one storey high) on a reinforced concrete frame. The first two low-rise buildings (formerly the Grunwald housing estate) feature an experimental insulation layer made of aerated concrete and Suprema (cement-chipboard panels).

Before the estate was built, the area was home to allotment gardens called Przyroda (Nature), inhabited in part by people whom the authorities at the time referred to as social outcasts. The clearing of the land, demolition of the slums and displacement of the population took place amid protests, with the use of force and the assistance of police units. Initially, it was planned to construct all buildings using Żerań brick technology, but ultimately it was decided to use large panels, which was a political decision inspired by Prof. Bohdan Lewicki, a proponent of Soviet solutions in Polish housing construction.

== Education ==
There are two primary schools in the estate: Primary School No. 88 named after Poznańskie Koziołki at 53 Swoboda Street and Primary School No. 91 named after Józef Wybicki at 4 Promyk Street.

== Communication ==
The estate can be reached by bus lines 145, 148, 150, 159, 163, 169, 177, 182, 191, 729 and night lines 240 and 242.

== See also ==
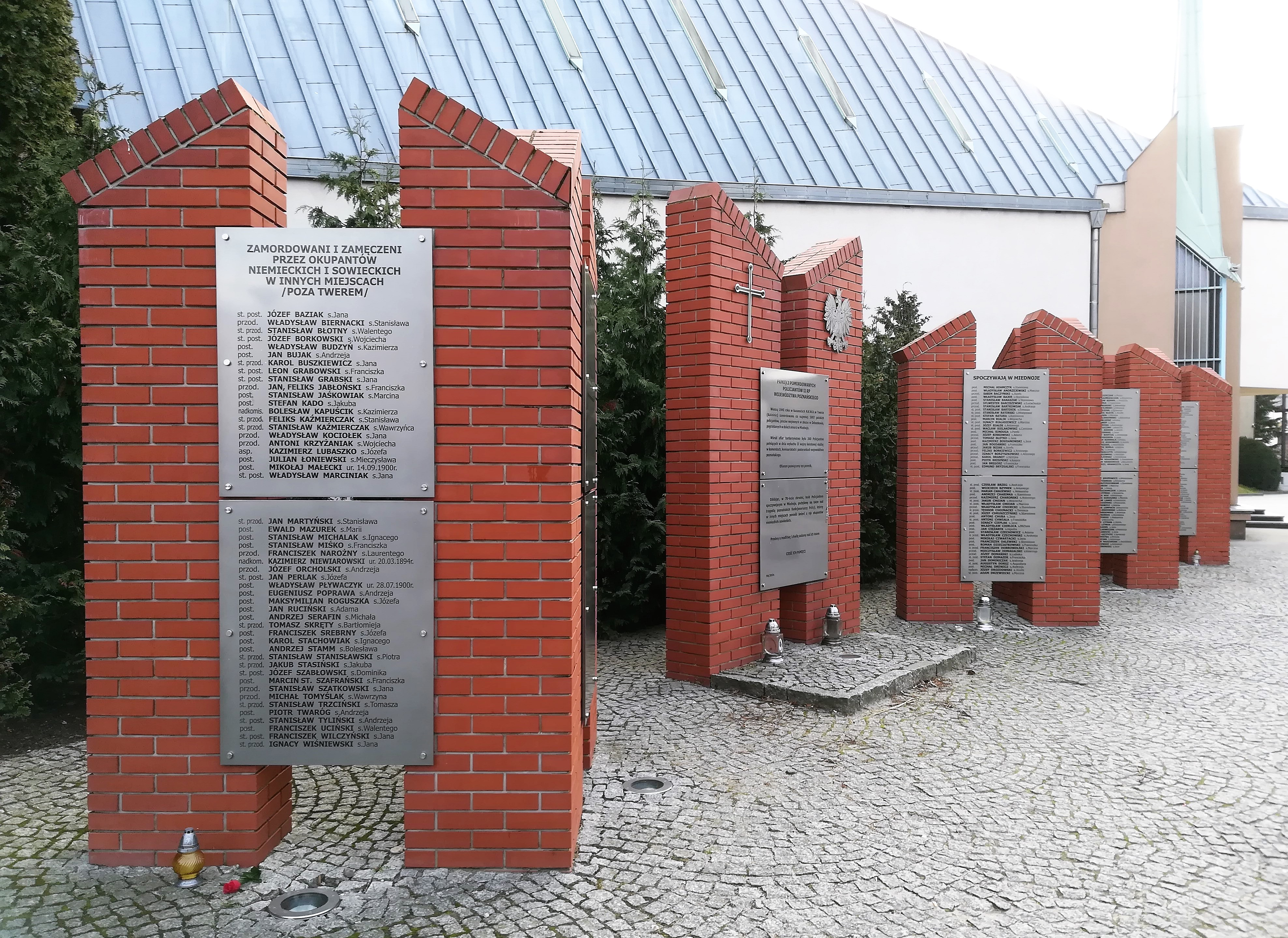
Monument to the Murdered Police Officers of the Second Polish Republic in the Poznań Province, located next to St. George's Church (2019)

- Jerzy Popiełuszko

== Bibliography ==
- Poznań – atlas aglomeracji 1:15.000, wyd. CartoMedia/Pietruska & Mierkiewicz, Poznań, 2008, ISBN 978-83-7445-018-8
- Janusz Pazder, O poznańskich pomnikach po 1918 roku, w: Kronika Miasta Poznania, nr 2/2001, Wydawnictwo Miejskie, Poznań, 2001, s.50, ISSN 0137-3552
- http://bip.city.poznan.pl/bip/public/bip/samorzady.html?co=print&sa_id=33 – rada osiedla
