= Poznań Old Town =

Poznań Old Town Stare Miasto
- Neighbourhood
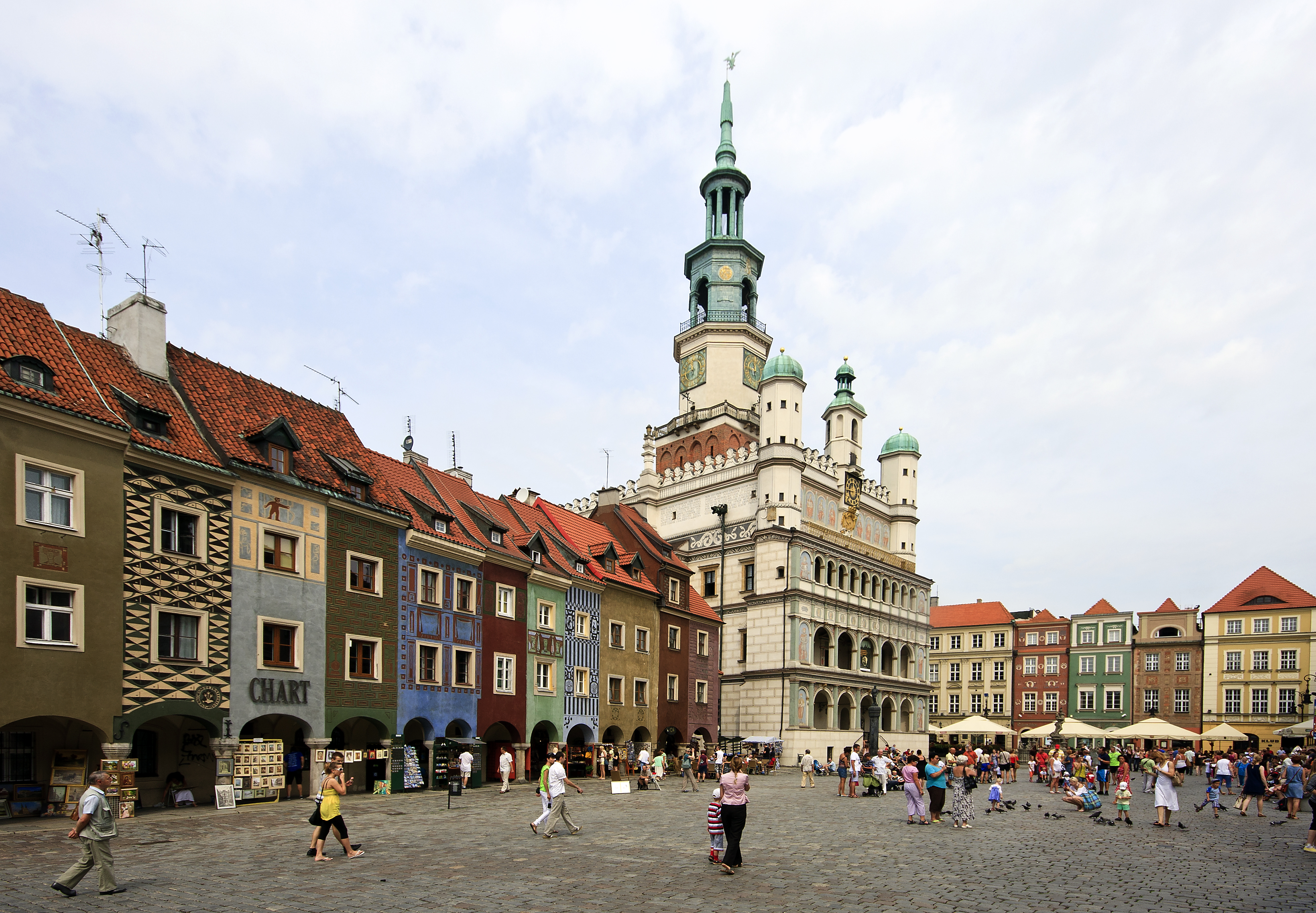
- Main Square in the Poznań Old Town

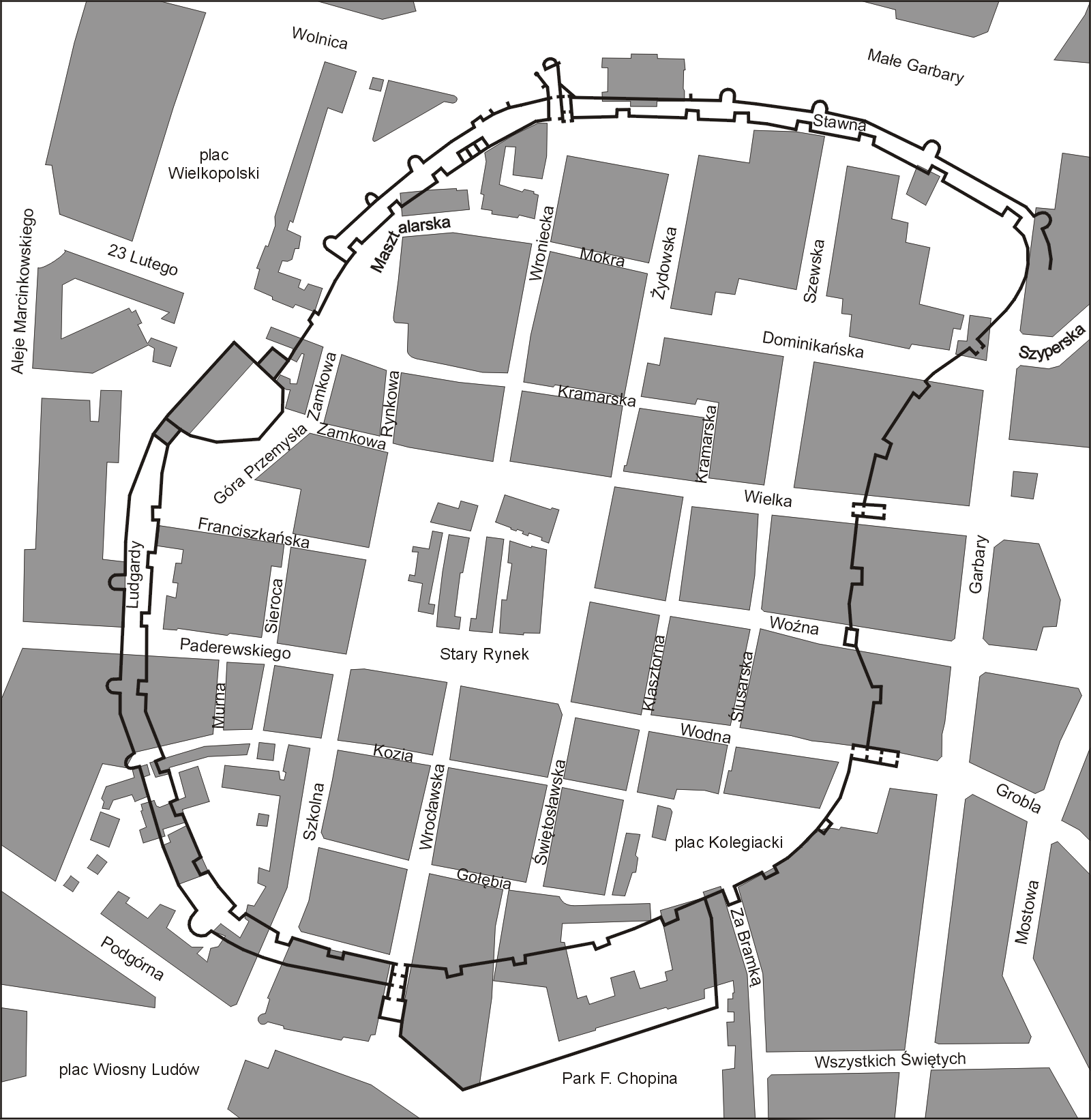

- Location within Poland Location within Greater Poland Voivodeship
- Coordinates: 52°24′30″N 16°56′4″E
- Country: Poland
- City: Poznań
- Established: 1253

Area
  - Total: 0.21 km^{2} (0.081 sq mi)
- Time zone: UTC+1 (CET)
  - Summer (DST): UTC+2 (CEST)

Historic Monument of Poland
- Designated: 2008-11-28
- Part of: Poznań – historic city center
- Reference no.: Dz.U. 2008 nr 219 poz. 1401

Poznań Old Town is the centermost neighbourhood of the city of Poznań in western Poland, covering the area of the once walled medieval city of Poznań. It is called Stare Miasto in Polish, although that name may also refer to the wider administrative district of Stare Miasto, which extends to most of the city centre and northern parts of the city.

The Old Town is centred on Stary Rynek, the Old Market Square where the historic Poznań Town Hall (Ratusz) stands. It represents the glory of Poznań, from its foundation in 1253. One of Town Hall's towers hosts two small billy goats, which butt their heads together every day at noon. At the western end of the Old Town is the Przemysł Hill (Góra Przemysła) on which the King's castle once stood. The medieval Royal Castle in Poznań has been reconstructed between 2011 and 2016.

The city walls were taken down when the city expanded in the early 19th century, but the street layout of the Old Town still corresponds closely to that of the former protected city, with a grid of narrow streets. Surviving fragments of the walls, some of which have been further reconstructed, can be seen on Stawna Street, Ludgardy Street, next to Chopin Park in the south of the Old Market Square and best parts are on Masztalarska street in the north.

Poznań Old Town is listed as one of Poland's official national Historic Monuments (Pomnik historii), as designated November 28, 2008, along with other portions of the city's historic core. Its listing is maintained by the National Heritage Board of Poland.

== Old Market Square ==
Old Market Place is the center and oldest part of the Old Town of Poznań.

== Streets in the Old Town ==
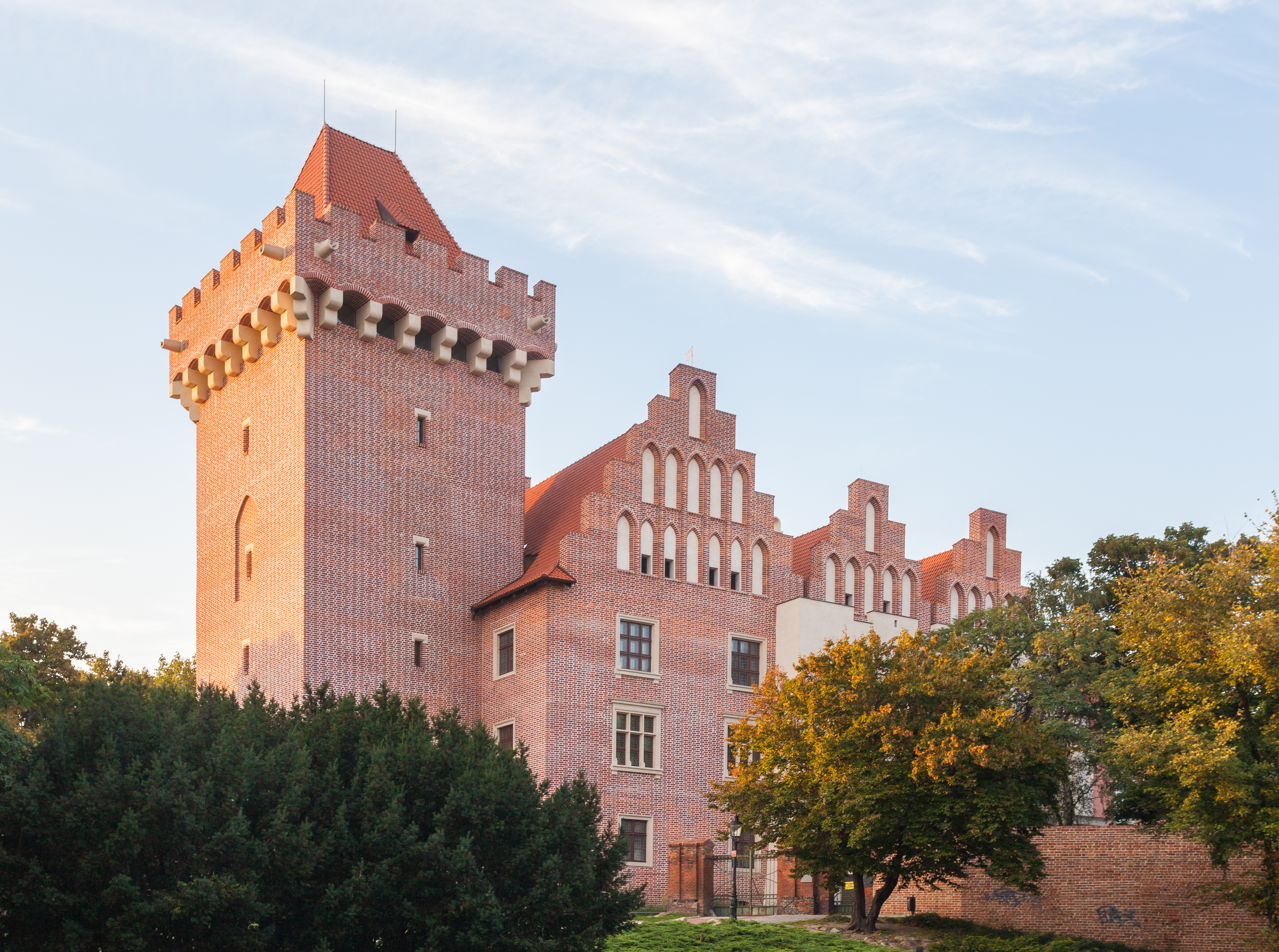
Royal Castle after its total reconstruction

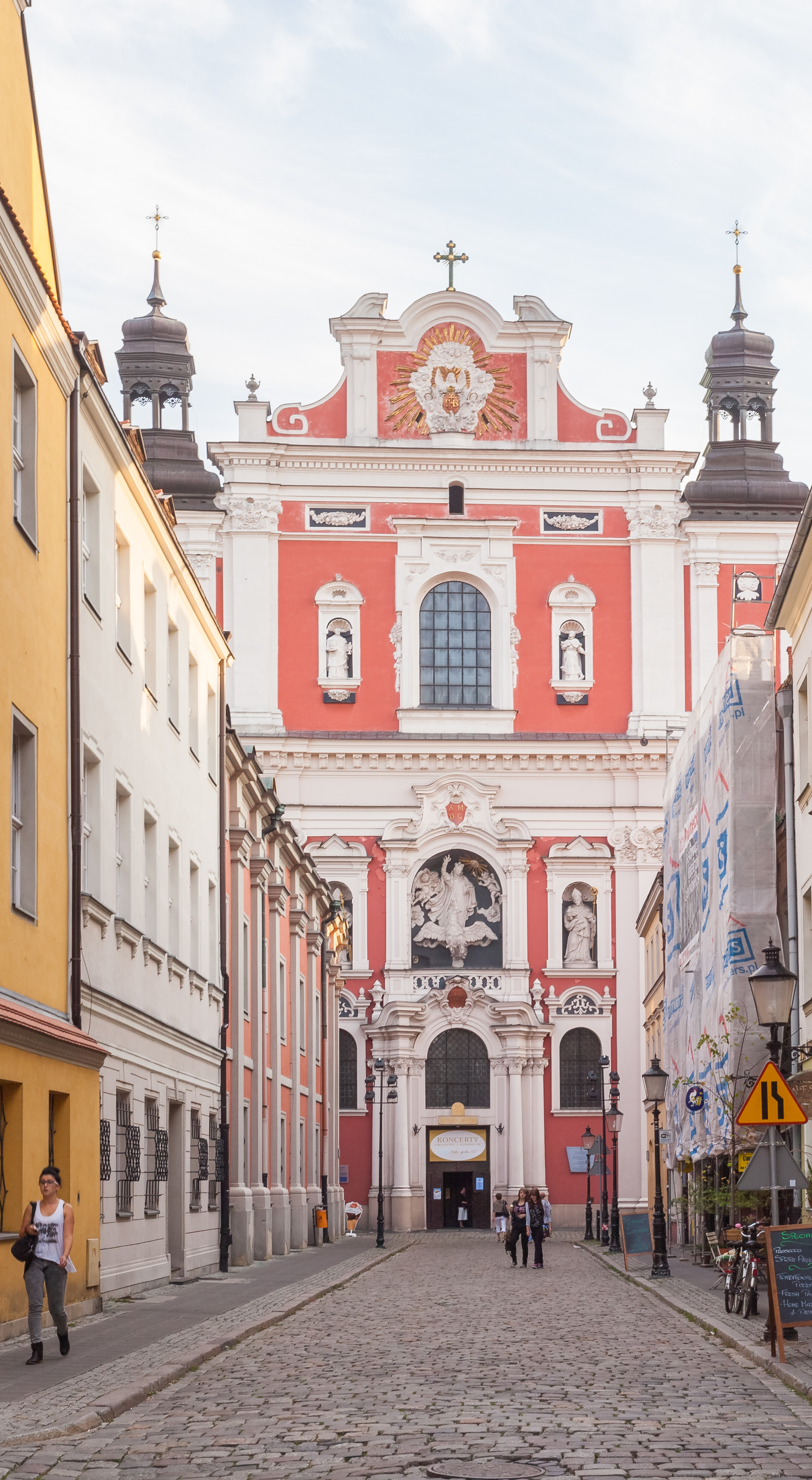
View of the Fara church from ul. Świętosławska

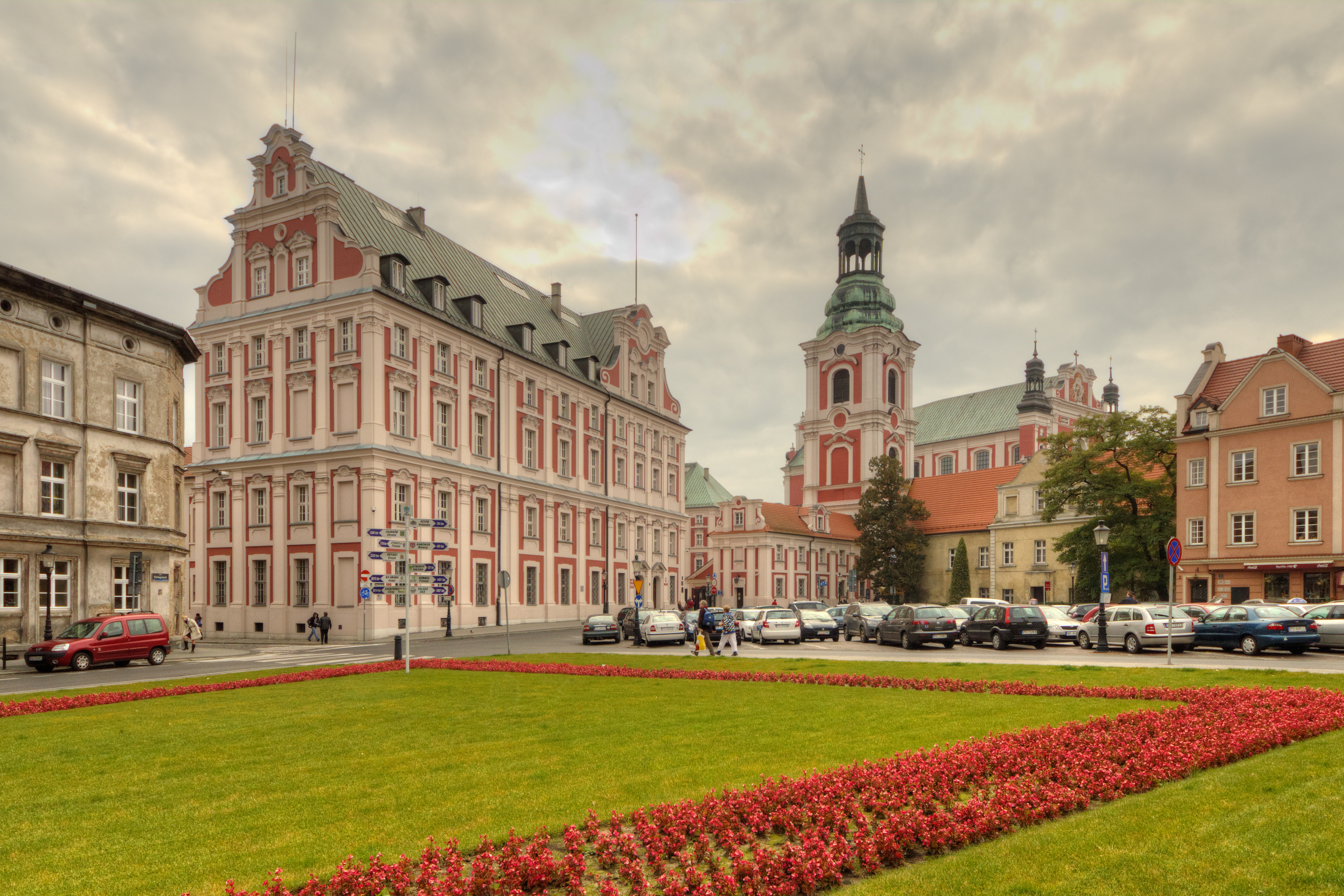
The former Jesuit College

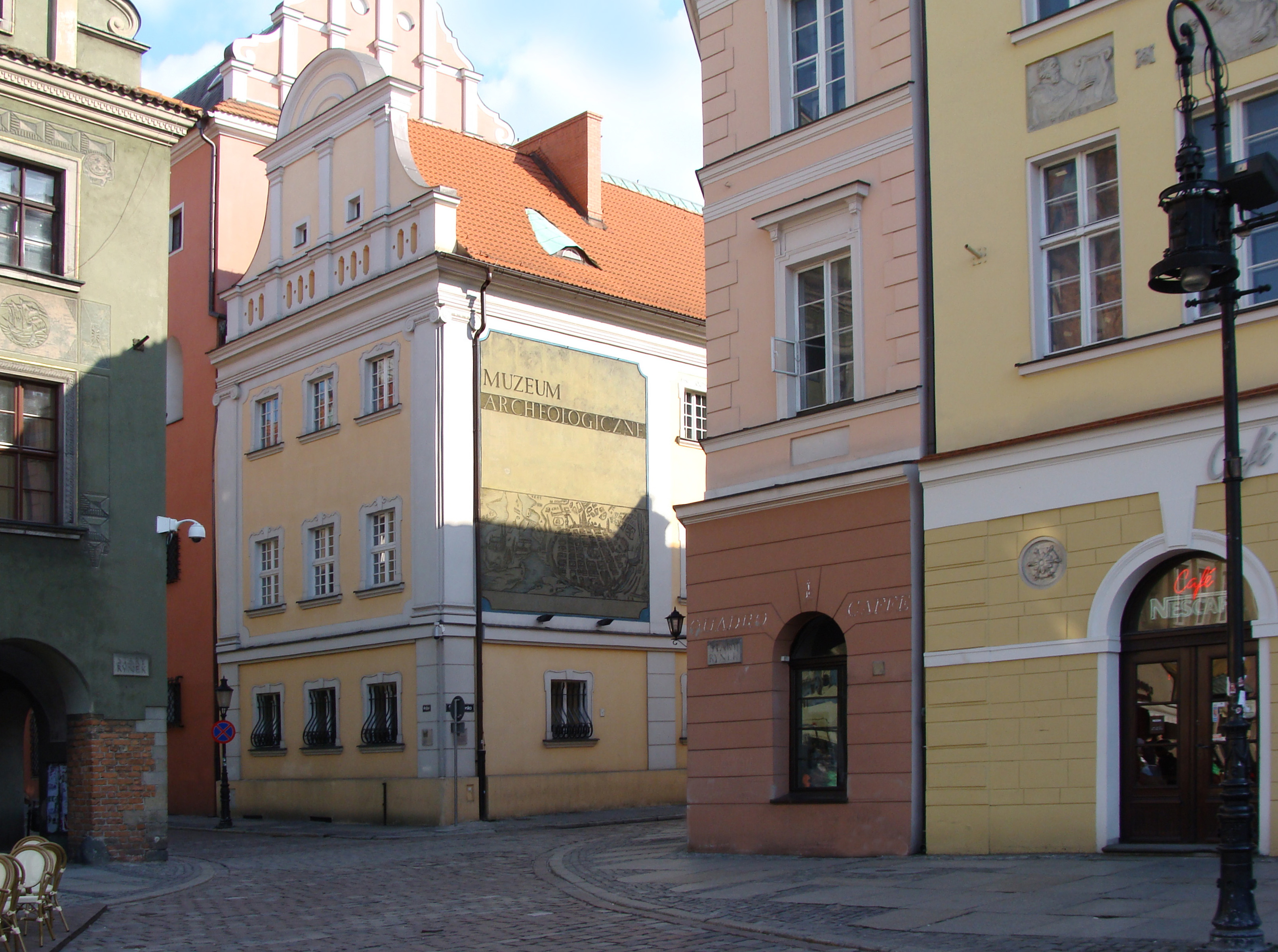
The Górkas' palace (now the archaeological museum) seen from the market square

The following is a list of present-day names of streets within the area of the former walled city (ul. stands for ulica, meaning "street").

Streets to the north of the market square:

- ul. Stawna ("Pond Street"), approximately following the line of the northern section of the former town walls.
- ul. Masztalarska ("Stableman Street"), running west and then south at the north-east corner of the Old Town. Part of a bastion from the town wall system (mostly reconstructed) stands adjacent to the street. There is also a section of wall, again mostly reconstructed, running between Masztalarska and Stawna (up to the Wronki Gate).
- ul. Mokra ("Wet Street"), connecting Wroniecka and Żydowska.
- ul. Dominikańska ("Dominican Street"), running east from Żydowska.
- ul. Kramarska ("Stallkeepers' Street"), parallel to the north edge of the market square.
- ul. 23 Lutego ("February 23rd Street"), an extension of Kramarska, leading west out of the Old Town neighbourhood (its name commemorates the day of victory in the 1945 Battle of Poznań).
- ul. Szewska ("Tailors' Street"), running north and south from Dominikańska.
- ul. Żydowska ("Jewish Street"), running north from the north-east corner of the square. The north-eastern part of the town was formerly the Jewish Quarter.
- ul. Wroniecka ("Wronki Street"), running north, centrally in relation to the square. It led to the Wronki Gate (Brama Wroniecka), beginning a northward route which crossed the Warta river at Wronki.
- ul. Rynkowa ("Market Street"), a short street between the north-west corner of the square and Kramarska.

Streets to the east of the market square:

- ul. Wielka ("Great Street"), running east from the north-east corner of the square. It led to the "Great Gate" (Brama Wielka), the main eastern exit from the town towards the cathedral.
- ul. Woźna ("Carriage Street"), running east, centrally in relation to the square.
- ul. Wodna ("Water Street"), running east from the south-east corner of the square. It led to the "Water Gate" (Brama Wodna), which gave access to the island of Grobla; the name alludes to the river. On the street close to the market square is the former "palace" of the Górka family, now an archaeological museum.
- ul. Klasztorna ("Abbey Street"), parallel to the east side of the square.
- ul. Ślusarska ("Metalworkers' Street"), parallel to and east of Klasztorna.

Streets to the south of the market square:

- ul. Kozia ("Goat Street"), parallel to the south side of the square. It was probably named after a sign showing goats (the name was originally applied to ul. Świętosławska).
- ul. Gołębia ("Pigeon Street"), parallel to and south of Kozia.
- ul. Jaskółcza ("Swallow Street"), connecting Szkolna and Wrocławska, south of Gołębia, on the line of the former walls.
- ul. Szkolna ("School Street"), running south from the south-west corner of the square.
- ul. Wrocławska ("Wrocław Street"), running south, centrally in relation to the square.
- ul. Świętosławska, running south from the south-east corner of the square, to the Fara (traditional parish church). It is named after St. Świętosław, the church's patron.
- Plac Kolegiacki, a square at the east end of Kozia and Gołębia, with the former Jesuit College, which now serves as the city government's offices, on its southern side.
- ul. Za Bramką ("Beyond the Gate"), leading south from Plac Kolegiacki.

(For ul. Klasztorna, which extends as far as Gołębia, see above.)

Streets to the west of the market square:

- ul. Paderewskiego ("Paderewski Street"), running west from the south-east corner of the square. This street was extended westwards at the time of the demolition of the city walls at the start of the 19th century, to connect the Old Town with the new district around today's Plac Wolności. Its present name is linked to the speech given by Ignacy Paderewski at the Bazar hotel (whose building stands at the western end of the street) in December 1918, precipitating the Greater Poland Uprising.
- ul. Franciszkańska ("Franciscan Street"), running west, centrally in relation to the square. A Franciscan monastery stands there.
- Góra Przemysława ("Przemysław's (Przemysł's) Hill"), a street named after the hill on which the Royal Castle stood, running on the slope of that hill, between Zamkowa and Franciszkańska.
- ul. Zamkowa ("Castle Street"), a short street leading west and then north, from the north-west corner of the square.
- ul. Sieroca ("Orphan Street"), parallel to the west side of the square.
- ul. Murna ("Wall Street"), connecting Paderewskiego and Kozia.
- ul. Ludgardy, connecting Paderewskiego and Franciszkańska, on the line of the former walls. A monument to the Greater Poland Uprising (1918) stands there.

== See also ==
- History of Poznań
- Museum of the History of Poznań
