= Posen speeches =

Himmler's 1943 speeches to Nazi officials

Authorised by Heinrich Himmler himself, this original page of the final edition of his speech made on 4 October 1943 bears the Reichsführer-SS's statements to his audience that the extermination of the Jews, a policy of the Nazi state, is being carried out.

The Posen speeches were two speeches made by Heinrich Himmler, the head of the SS of Nazi Germany, on 4 and 6 October 1943 in the town hall of Posen (Poznań), in German-occupied Poland. The recordings are the first known documents in which a member of the Hitler cabinet publicly spoke of the ongoing extermination of the Jews in extermination camps. They demonstrate that the German government wanted, planned, and carried out the Holocaust.

== Overview ==
The Posen speeches of October 1943 are eight of 132 speeches obtained in various forms which the head of the SS, Heinrich Himmler, conducted before officials of the Nazi Party. The first speech was given before 92 SS officers, the second before Reichsleiters and Gauleiters, as well as other government representatives. They constitute some of the most important of Himmler's speeches during the war, as they demonstrate Himmler's role as "Architect of the Final Solution" and a visionary of an elite race to be henceforth supported by the SS state.

Although the genocide of the Jews was not the central topic in either of them, both carry historical significance in reference to it. Himmler dispensed with the usual euphemisms and spoke explicitly of the extermination of the Jews via mass murder, which he depicted as a historical mission of the Nazis. This connection became clear in five further speeches made between December 1943 and June 1944 to commanders of the Wehrmacht.

In the literature, only the first speech was known as the "Posen Speech" until 1970. The second speech, uncovered at that time, is often mistaken as the first or equated with it.

== Historical context ==
Himmler gave the speeches at a time when German military setbacks were mounting and the Nazi political and military leadership were privately expressing alarm. At the Casablanca Conference in January, 1943, the Allies had decided that the only acceptable outcome of the war was Germany's unconditional surrender. The Soviet victory in the Battle of Stalingrad on 2 February 1943 was a turning point in the war. US President Franklin D. Roosevelt announced the prosecution of those mainly responsible for war and genocide on 12 February, which the US Congress agreed to on 18 March. Allied troops landed on Sicily on 7 July 1943 and successfully invaded the Italian mainland on the 3 September, and after the Italian armistice on 8 September, gradually advanced northward. On 1 October, Naples was freed from German occupation.

German hopes of regaining the military initiative on the Eastern front were dashed by the failure of the Battle of Kursk in early July, and the resultant massive Soviet counter offensive ushered in permanent German retreats for the remainder of the war. In the week 27 July – 3 August 1943, Allied air raids attacked Hamburg in Operation Gomorrah, and the armament centre of Peenemünde was heavily damaged by Operation Hydra on the night of 17–18 August, critically disrupting V-weapons development. At the same time resistance against German forces in the Western occupied territories grew, and a state of emergency was declared in Norway (17 August) and Denmark (29 August). German dissidents planned Germany's reorganisation (the Kreisau Circle) and assassination attempts on Adolf Hitler (particularly the 20 July plot). A scorched earth policy was brought in on 4 September for retreats on the Eastern Front, and martial law against those in the armed forces who refused to follow orders, initially introduced by the General Government on 2 October.

In the same period, the destruction of the Jews became the most important goal. In the spring of 1943, Sonderaktion 1005 was in full operation, the exhumation and incineration of those murdered by the Einsatzgruppen across the whole Eastern Front, whose death toll had so far reached 1.8 million Jews. Himmler ordered the liquidation of all Jewish ghettos in German-occupied Poland on 11 June, and all Soviet ones on 21 June. As of 25 June, four new crematoria and gas chamber installations were completed in Auschwitz-II Birkenau at Auschwitz concentration camp. On 1 July all Jews in the Reich were placed under police law. On 24 August 1943 Himmler was appointed as Minister of the Interior, and thus all police forces in the Reich and occupied territories were subordinated to him. By 19 October, Operation Reinhard was to be terminated and the affiliated extermination camps dismantled.

Nonetheless, acts of resistance against the destruction of the Jews occurred. There were prisoner rebellions in Treblinka (2 August 1943) and Sobibor (14 October 1943). Jews of the Białystok Ghetto mounted an insurrection against their liquidation (16–23 August), and the Danes helped most of the Danish Jews planned for arrest to escape.

== Speech of 4 October 1943 ==
Himmler did not prepare most of his speeches beforehand, but used terse handwritten notes instead. Since the end of 1942 his verbal lectures were no longer documented in shorthand, but recorded via phonograph onto wax master plates. These recordings were then typed up by SS-Untersturmführer Werner Alfred Wenn, who corrected obvious grammatical errors and supplemented missing words. Himmler then added his own handwritten corrections, and the thus authorised version was copied up via typewriter in large characters and then filed away.

Of Himmler's three-hour speech of 4 October 1943, 115 pages of the final typewritten edition (one page was lost) were discovered among SS files and submitted to the Nuremberg trials as document 1919-PS. On day 23 of the hearing, a passage (which however did not concern the Holocaust) was read out. A live recording of this speech survives, allowing for the differences between the spoken and the copyedited version to be examined. They are minor, and in no case distortionary.

=== Addressees, reason and purpose ===
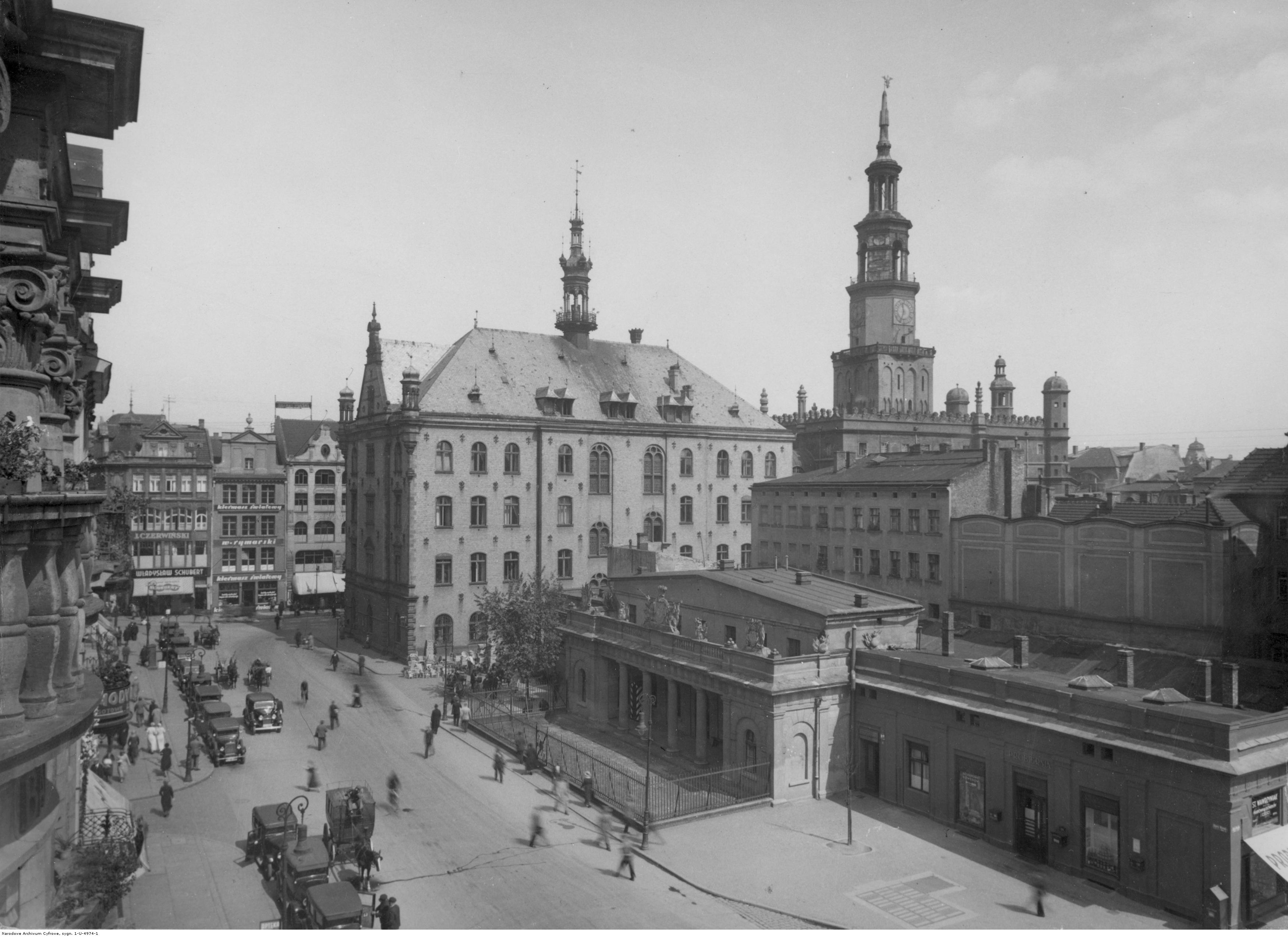
Posen's town hall, where the conference took place (heavily damaged during WWII)

Himmler gave the first speech in the town hall of Posen, and not in the imperial palace as is often erroneously assumed. Of the SS's leadership cadre, 33 Obergruppenführer, 51 Gruppenführer and eight Brigadeführer from the whole of the Reich were present. Many of these came from areas of occupied eastern Europe. Large parts of the speech therefore concerned the increasingly precarious situation on the Eastern Front, while attempting to explain Soviet military successes as being due to a claimed combination of Communist ruthlessness and the weaknesses of Germany's allies.

Only about two minutes of the speech concerns the destruction of the Jews. Himmler assumes that his audience is experienced with mass shootings, ghetto liquidations and extermination camps, and accordingly, already possesses knowledge of them. The speech is to justify the crimes already perpetrated, and to commit its listeners to the "higher purpose" bestowed upon them. Around 50 officers not present were sent a copy of the speech and had to confirm their acknowledgment of it.

=== On the course of war ===
After a tribute to the war dead, Himmler gave his view of the war so far. The tough Soviet resistance could be attributed to the political commissars, the German invasion of the Soviet Union was a preemptive strike and due to failure by Germany's allies, a chance for victory in 1942 was wasted. Himmler speculated over the Soviet army's potential, spoke disparagingly of the "Vlasov shivaree" (der Wlassow-Rummel), expatiated on the inferiority of the Slavic race, and included thoughts as to how a German minority can prevail over it.

In later passages, Himmler claimed Italy's army had been contaminated with communism and was sympathetic to the Western allies. He also touches upon the situation in the Balkans and other occupied territories, whose acts of resistance he disregards as irritating pinpricks. The war in the air and sea is also mentioned, as well as the domestic front (die innere Front) and factors from it such as enemy radio broadcasters and defeatism stemming from air raids.

Subsequently, Himmler turns to the situation on the enemy's side, speculating over the relationship between the United Kingdom and the United States and their resilience and readiness for war. He goes into extensive detail about variances in the SS, individual divisions, police organisations, and outlines his duties regarding economic operations of the SS and being a minister of the Reich.

=== Eastern Europe, Soviet prisoners of war ===
In his outline of the course of the war in the east, Himmler comments on the deaths of millions of Soviet prisoners of war and forced labourers. Like in pre-war speeches, and in accordance with Hitler's remarks in Mein Kampf, he speaks of how the eradication of the Slavic Untermensch is a historical and natural necessity. There is to be no place for sentiment:

One basic principle must be the absolute rule for the SS men: We must be honest, decent, loyal and comradely to members of our own blood and to nobody else. What happens to a Russian, to a Czech, does not interest me in the slightest. What other nations can offer in the way of good blood of our type, we will take, if necessary, by kidnapping their children and raising them here with us. Whether nations live in prosperity or starve to death interests me only so far as we need them as slaves for our culture; otherwise, it is of no interest to me. Whether 10,000 Russian females fall down from exhaustion while digging an antitank ditch interests me only insofar as the anti-tank ditch for Germany is finished.

=== "Extermination of the Jewish people" ===
"Die Ausrottung des jüdischen Volkes"
An excerpt of this speech where Himmler discusses the ongoing extermination of the Jews.

Himmler explicitly speaks of the genocide of the Jews, framing it as a legitimate war measure, something which had not been previously done by a representative of the Nazi Party up until this point (though Goebbels came close to uttering the word Ausrottung before catching himself during the Sportpalast speech eight months earlier):

I am now referring to the evacuation of the Jews, the extermination of the Jewish people. It's one of those things that is easily said: 'The Jewish people are being exterminated', says every party member, 'this is very obvious, it's in our program, elimination of the Jews, extermination, we're doing it, hah, a small matter.' And then they turn up, the upstanding 80 million Germans, and each one has his decent Jew. They say the others are all swines, but this particular one is a splendid Jew. But none has observed it, endured it. Most of you here know what it means when 100 corpses lie next to each other, when there are 500 or when there are 1,000. To have endured this and at the same time to have remained a decent person — with exceptions due to human weaknesses — has made us tough, and is a glorious chapter that has not and will not be spoken of. Because we know how difficult it would be for us if we still had Jews as secret saboteurs, agitators and rabble-rousers in every city, what with the bombings, with the burden and with the hardships of the war. If the Jews were still part of the German nation, we would most likely arrive now at the state we were at in 1916 and 17 [...]

Himmler then praises the mindset of the SS man, devoting approximately 30 of the 116 pages to their virtues as well as their duty of becoming Europe's ruling class in 20 to 30 years.

== Speech of 6 October 1943 ==
Of the second Posen speech, Himmler's terse notes are available, as well as a version recorded via shorthand then typed up and corrected in detail, and the final version as authorised by Himmler himself. The speech in each of these stages resided in the files of the Personal Staff Reichsführer-SS (Persönlicher Stab Reichsführer-SS), which were seized in their entirety by U.S. authorities in 1945. The text of the speech was recorded into microfilm by the U.S. and released to the Bundesarchiv. Analysis of these previously unavailable documents by historian Erich Goldhagen in 1970 in Koblenz revealed a speech hitherto unknown. It was printed in its entirety for the first time in 1974 in Bradley Smith's and Agnes Peterson's book of selected Himmler speeches.

At the end of September 1943, the party chancellery invited all Reichsleiters and Gauleiters, the head of the Hitler Youth Artur Axmann and Reich ministers Albert Speer and Alfred Rosenberg to a conference. The conference began on 6 October at 9 o'clock in the morning with Speer's reports, his speakers, and four big industries for armament production. Talks from Karl Dönitz and Erhard Milch followed. Himmler held his speech from 17:30 to 19:00. The second speech is shorter than the first, but contains a slightly longer and more explicit passage regarding the genocide of the Jews.

=== Beginning of the speech ===
Himmler begins by discussing partisans in Russia and support from the Russian Liberation Army, Andrey Vlasov's collaborationist forces. The widespread idea that there would be a 300-kilometre wide belt dominated by partisans behind the German front is considered false. Frequently expressed is the view that Russia can only be conquered by Russians. This view is considered to be dangerous and wrong. Slavs are to be considered unreliable on a matter of principle, and for that reason, Russian Hiwis may only be employed as combatants in mixed units.

The danger of infiltrated parachutists, fugitive POWs and forced labourers is considered marginal, since the German population is in an impeccable way and grants the opponent no shelter, and the police have such dangers under control. A request by Gauleiters for a special force against the insurgency in the country is considered to be unnecessary and unacceptable.

=== On the "Jewish question" ===
Himmler then reveals to "this most secret circle" his thoughts on the Jewish question, which he describes as "the most difficult decision of my life".

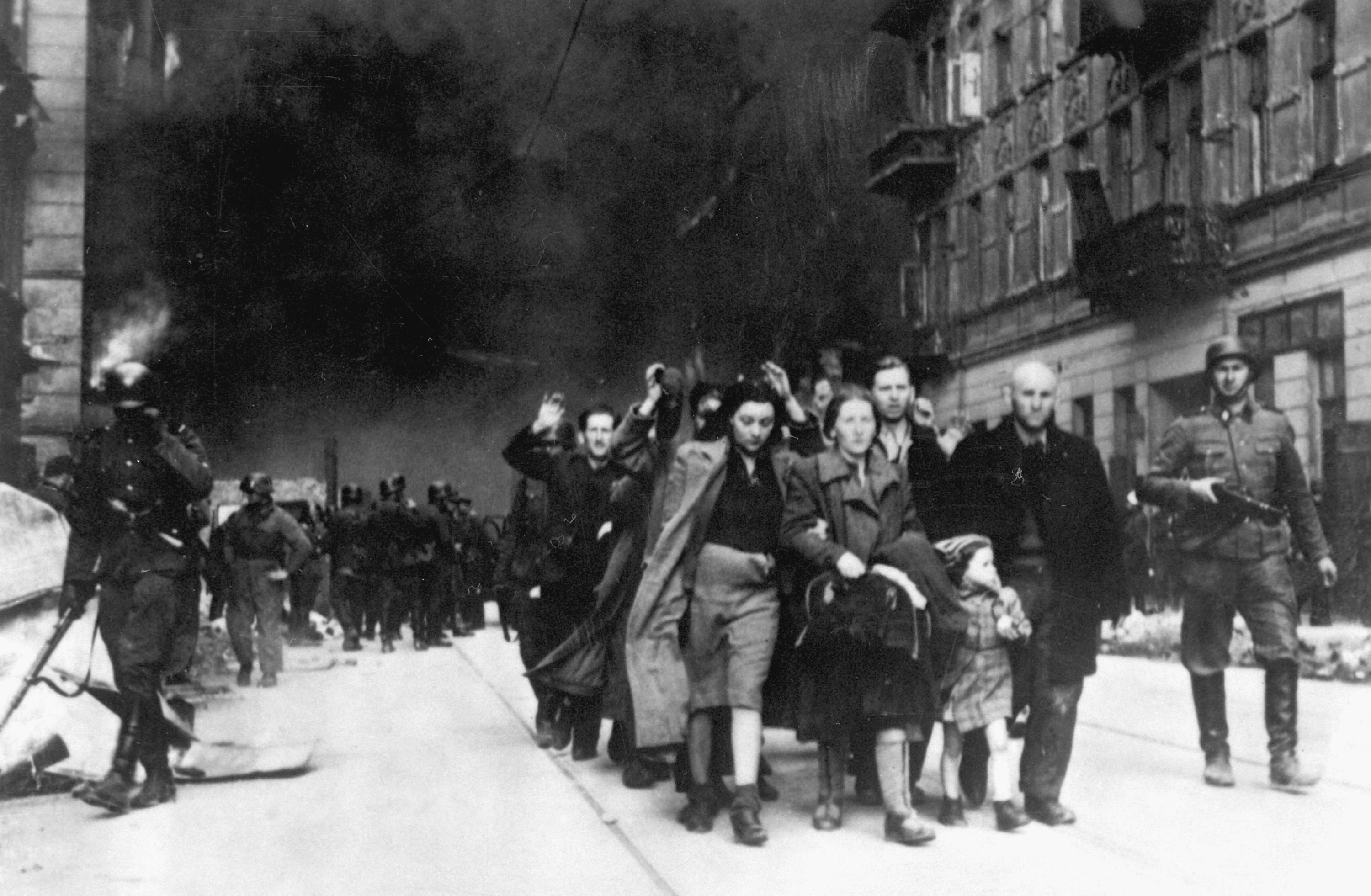
Stroop Report original caption: "Forcibly pulled out of dug-outs". Captured Jews are led by German troops to the assembly point for deportation after the Warsaw Ghetto Uprising, 1943

I ask of you that that which I say to you in this circle be really only heard and not ever discussed. We were faced with the question: what about the women and children? – I decided to find a clear solution to this problem too. I did not consider myself justified to exterminate the men – in other words, to kill them or have them killed and allow the avengers of our sons and grandsons in the form of their children to grow up. The difficult decision had to be made to have this people disappear from the earth. For the organisation which had to execute this task, it was the most difficult which we had ever had. [...] I felt obliged to you, as the most superior dignitary, as the most superior dignitary of the party, this political order, this political instrument of the Führer, to also speak about this question quite openly and to say how it has been. The Jewish question in the countries that we occupy will be solved by the end of this year. Only remainders of odd Jews that managed to find hiding places will be left over.

Himmler then discusses the Warsaw Ghetto Uprising (19 April – 16 May 1943) and the heavy battles during it:

This entire ghetto was producing fur coats, dresses, and the like. Whenever we tried to get at it in the past we were told: Stop! Armaments factory! Of course, this has nothing to do with Party Comrade Speer. It wasn't your doing. It is this portion of alleged armaments factories that Party Comrade Speer and I intend to clear out in the next few weeks.

This last sentence seems to refer to the upcoming Operation Harvest Festival where the remaining Jewish forced laborers in the Lublin District of German-occupied Poland were liquidated. 43,000 Jews were murdered in this operation on 3–4 November 1943.

Himmler discusses the July 1943 ouster of Benito Mussolini, which is to have led to defeatism. A few death sentences imposed on the basis of making corrosive remarks are to serve as dissuasive warnings for thousands of others; party members must display exemplary behaviour. Himmler then discusses his newly acquired duties as Reich Minister of the Interior. (Hitler appointed him to this position on 24 August 1943, replacing Wilhelm Frick.) By Hitler's orders, party organisation and administrative organisation are henceforth two separate pillars. Decentralized decisions are considered important, but centralised arrangements take precedence in the strained war situation. As a result, Himmler makes broad criticism of the personal politics of Gauleiters. In the last part of his speech, he goes into the benefits of the Waffen-SS. Himmler closes by discussing how the German national boundary will be pushed 500 km eastwards, that the 120 million German people will be educated among many other future aims, and then ends with the appeal:

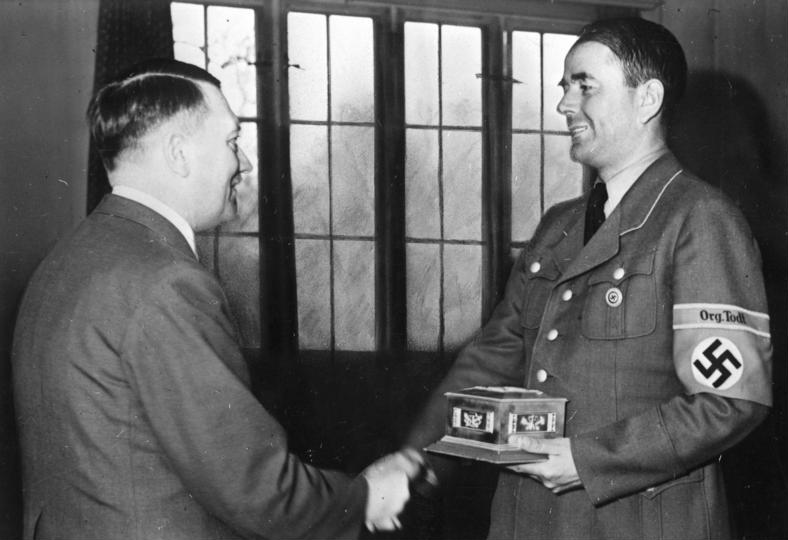
Albert Speer awarded an Organisation Todt ring by Adolf Hitler – May 1943

When we see this then we will never lose our belief, never will we become disloyal, never will we be cowardly, never in bad spirits, but we will strive to be worthy to have lived under Adolf Hitler and been allowed to fight with him.

Albert Speer, Reich minister for arms and munition since 1942, was, since 2 September 1943 as Reich minister for armament and wartime economy, responsible for all German armament production. This used Jewish forced labourers who were partly exempted from being deported to their extermination until 1943. After 1945, Speer always maintained that he left the conference before Himmler made his speech and knew nothing of the Holocaust. Historians cite Himmler's direct second-person reference to Speer as proof of his presence.

== Further speeches ==
A handwritten memo from Himmler's speech on 26 January 1944 in Posen to Generals of fighting troops reads:

Largest stabilisation in the G.G. since the solution to the Jewish question. – Race war. Total solution. Not allowing avengers to rise against our children.

5 May 1944 - Himmler's Posen Speeches excerpt

On 5 May 1944 Himmler explained to Generals in Sonthofen that perseverance in the bombing war has only been possible because the Jews in Germany have been discarded.

The Jewish question has been solved within Germany itself and in general within the countries occupied by Germany. [...] You can understand how difficult it was for me to carry out this military order which I was given and which I implemented out of a sense of obedience and absolute conviction. If you say: 'we can understand as far as the men are concerned but not about the children', then I must remind you of what I said at the beginning. [...] In my view, we as Germans, however deeply we may feel in our hearts, are not entitled to allow a generation of avengers filled with hatred to grow up with whom our children and grandchildren will have to deal because we, too weak and cowardly, left it to them.

1944-05-25 - Heinrich Himmler - Rede vor Vertretern der deutschen Justiz in Kochem 1h 44m

Applause can be heard on a recording of another speech given to Generals in Sonthofen on 24 May 1944, when Himmler says:

Another question which was decisive for the inner security of the Reich and Europe, was the Jewish question. It was uncompromisingly solved after orders and rational recognition. I believe, gentlemen, that you know me well enough to know that I am not a bloodthirsty person; I am not a man who takes pleasure or joy when something rough must be done. However on the other hand, I have such good nerves and such a developed sense of duty – I can say that much for myself – that when I recognise something as necessary I can implement it without compromise. I have not considered myself entitled – this concerns especially the Jewish women and children – to allow the children to grow into the avengers who will then murder our children and our grandchildren. That would have been cowardly. Consequently the question was uncompromisingly resolved.

On 21 June 1944 Himmler spoke to Generals educated in the Nazi world view in Sonthofen, mentioning the Jewish question again:

It was the most terrible task and the most terrible order which could have been given to an organisation: the order to solve the Jewish question. In this circle, I may say it frankly with a few sentences. It is good that we had the severity to exterminate the Jews in our domain.

=== Historical reception ===
The destruction of the Jews was to be kept secret from those outside the Nazi regime, but could only be organised and carried out with the participation of all relevant state and party executives. The Posen speeches offer a retrospective look at the mass killings already carried out, and show how these and further killings were ideologically justified by the Party. The extermination of the "internal enemy" (innerer Feind), the Jewish race, had become an objective of the war, and success in this field was to compensate for other defeats accrued in the course of the war.

Saul Friedländer highlights Himmler's self-image as an unconditionally obedient executor of Hitler's plans for the Germanic "Lebensraum in the east".

The Reichsführer frequently describes the extermination of the Jews as a heavy responsibility assigned by the Führer. There is thus no debate: this task calls for unremitting devotion and a spirit of continual self-sacrifice of him and his men.

Konrad Kwiet comments on Himmler's association of the "heaviest task" the SS ever had to perform with the Anständigkeit (decency) that had been preserved of it:

It is precisely this monstrous combination of murder and morality, of crime and decency at the core of the perpetrator's mentality. In the scope of the Nazi ethic, an entirely new concept of decency was created and made as a duty. Hannah Arendt coined the term "banality of evil", other authors emphasize the "normality of crime". Almost all perpetrators were characterized by their ability to return to the routine of every day life, and to lead a "normal" life after perpetrating murder. Most reacted with surprise, confusion and anger when they were prosecuted and reminded of the past. Ignorance and innocence were stressed before the court. The murderers were – with exceptions – spared from the traumatic experiences that survivors were left with.

Hans Buchheim comments that the accused perpetrators very probably lacked a mens rea ("guilty mind"). Himmler's revaluation of soldierly virtues was not a total negation of moral norms, but a suspension of them for the exceptional situation of the extermination of the Jews, which had been passed off as a historical necessity. Therefore, Himmler endorsed the murder of the Jews not by instruction, but via the "correct" ideological motives, while letting similar murders committed out of sadism or selfishness be prosecutable.

Historian Dieter Pohl states:

Traditional institutions of the Nazi state secretly began the search for a defence strategy for the post-war period in 1943: one had not been informed, and the SS was exclusively to blame.

The unsparing portrayal of the genocide in Himmler's speech is thus interpreted as a means to formally render senior SS and Nazi functionaries as co-conspirators and accomplices in the perpetration of the Holocaust.

Joseph Goebbels alludes to this view in his diary entry of 2 March 1943:

As always in the circles of the party, it is the duty of the Führer's closest friends to gather around him in such times of need [...] Above all with the Jewish question, we are so fixed on it that there is no longer any escape. And that's good. A movement and a people that have broken the bridges behind them fight from experience much more unreservedly than those that still have the possibility to retreat.

In an entry dated 9 October 1943, Goebbels commented on Himmler's second speech, at which he was present:

Regarding the Jewish question, he [Himmler] gives a very unadorned and frank picture. He is of the conviction that the Jewish question can be solved by the end of this year. He advocates the most radical and most severe solution, namely to exterminate Jewry, bag and baggage. Of course, if brutal, this is a consistent solution. Because we must take on the responsibility of entirely solving this question in our time. Subsequent generations will doubtlessly no longer dare address this problem with the courage and obsession as we are able to do today.

=== Holocaust denial ===
Holocaust deniers have frequently attempted to negate Himmler's speeches as proof of the Holocaust. In particular, where Himmler – in his speech of 4 October 1943 – refers to the "Ausrottung des jüdischen Volkes" (extermination of the Jewish people), they will read the verb ausrotten (literally to "root out", aus = out; rott = root) and its related noun Ausrottung to offer a much more benign interpretation, i.e., Himmler was merely referring to the deportation of Jews and a desire to "root them out", as opposed to their mass destruction.

Ausrotten can mean "to stamp out/to root out", but only figuratively, e.g., in contexts of concepts or ideals. In the context of living things (such as a people or race), ausrotten accordingly means destroying something so that it cannot return. David Irving considers the usage of the word "Ausrotten" vitally important and also agrees that the term was referring to eradication. He confirms this in an interview from 2007 when he compares its usage with Goebbels' half-word "Ausrott..." during the Sportpalast speech from February 1943. In the subsequent paragraph, Himmler compares his disdain for individuals gaining personally (e.g. stealing) from Jewish victims, and the necessity to prevent this personal gain, to becoming sick and dying "from the same bacillus that we have exterminated" (weil wir den Bazillus ausrotten, an dem Bazillus krank werden und sterben). This use of ausrotten can be read as killing or extermination in the context of living things, because arguing for the deportation of bacteria would make no sense. The reference to a bacillus in this statement is figurative, however, in line with Nazi rhetoric that encouraged dehumanizing concepts of Jews as a pathogen or malignant presence, rather than people.

In the "Ausrottung des jüdischen Volkes" paragraph, Himmler says:

Original

... wir hatten die Pflicht unserem Volk gegenüber das zu tun, dieses Volk, das uns umbringen wollte, umzubringen.

Translated

... we had the duty to our people to do it, to kill this people who wanted to kill us.

Himmler thus confirms that the context is explicitly physical extermination, since umbringen simply has no meaning other than "to kill". Because of this, critics explain that Holocaust deniers will arbitrarily select words from the dictionary that have nothing to do with the given context, such as cherry-picking the definition for Unkraut (weeds) and erroneously applying it to Volk (people).

In the second speech in Posen, critics point to the fact that he defines the meaning of ausrotten, where the operative word is umbringen.

Original

Es trat an uns die Frage heran: Wie ist es mit den Frauen und Kindern? Ich habe mich entschlossen, auch hier eine ganz klare Lösung zu finden. Ich hielt mich nämlich nicht für berechtigt, die Männer auszurotten – sprich also, umzubringen oder umbringen zu lassen – und die Rächer in Gestalt der Kinder für unsere Söhne und Enkel groß werden zu lassen. Es mußte der schwere Entschluß gefaßt werden, dieses Volk von der Erde verschwinden zu lassen.

Translated

We came to the question: How is it with the women and children? I decided to find a clear solution here as well. I did not consider myself justified to exterminate the men – in other words, to kill them or have them killed – and allow the avengers of our sons and grandsons in the form of their children to grow up. The difficult decision had to be taken to make this people disappear from the earth.

Holocaust deniers will also offer erroneous translations of ausrotten by analysing the word's compounds, on the basis that "aus" and "rotten" are cognate with the English "out" and "root". To native German speakers, this is simply wrong. Critics compare this attempted etymological explanation to an attempt to cite the Latin origins of "ex" (out of) and "terminus" (borders) and on that basis, claim that "exterminate" means deportation, which would be equally nonsensical to native English speakers.

Critics point out that German Holocaust deniers do not dare suggest a translation to a German audience where ausrotten does not mean physical extermination, citing instances of German deniers dismissing failed etymological analysis by English speakers by responding to confirm that ausrotten means complete destruction, and material written by German deniers where, in the context of people, ausrotten and vernichten are used synonymously.

Germar Rudolf and Udo Walendy have claimed that the recording of the first speech is a forgery: Himmler's voice was actually that of a 1945 Allied voice imitator. However, the discovery of the second Posen speech in the Koblenz Bundesarchiv rendered allegations of falsification completely irrelevant. Himmler's explicit statements, such as making the decision to make the Jews "disappear from the earth", leave no room for alternative interpretation.

=== Artistic references ===
In Romuald Karmakar's 2000 film The Himmler Project, the actor Manfred Zapatka reads the entire speech of 4 October 1943 word for word according to the recording, including all the nuances and incidents also recorded and the repetitions where Himmler loses his place while reading from a prepared manuscript. During the film, Zapatka wears no uniform and simply stands in front of a grey wall.

Heinrich Breloers multipart television film Speer und Er contains a debate as to whether Albert Speer was present during Himmler's speech on 6 October 1943.

In Jonathan Littell's The Kindly Ones, the first-person narrator, Maximilian Aue, cannot remember whether Speer was present or not, but does cite Speer's remark that he (Speer) remembered many officers being terribly drunk. As Speer arrived in the morning for his speech, this would actually mean Speer was still present during the evening's dinner, after Himmler's second Posen speech.

== See also ==
- Incitement to genocide
- New Order (Nazism)
- Bibliography of the Holocaust § Primary Sources
