= Poznań Town Hall =

Historic city hall in Poznań, Poland

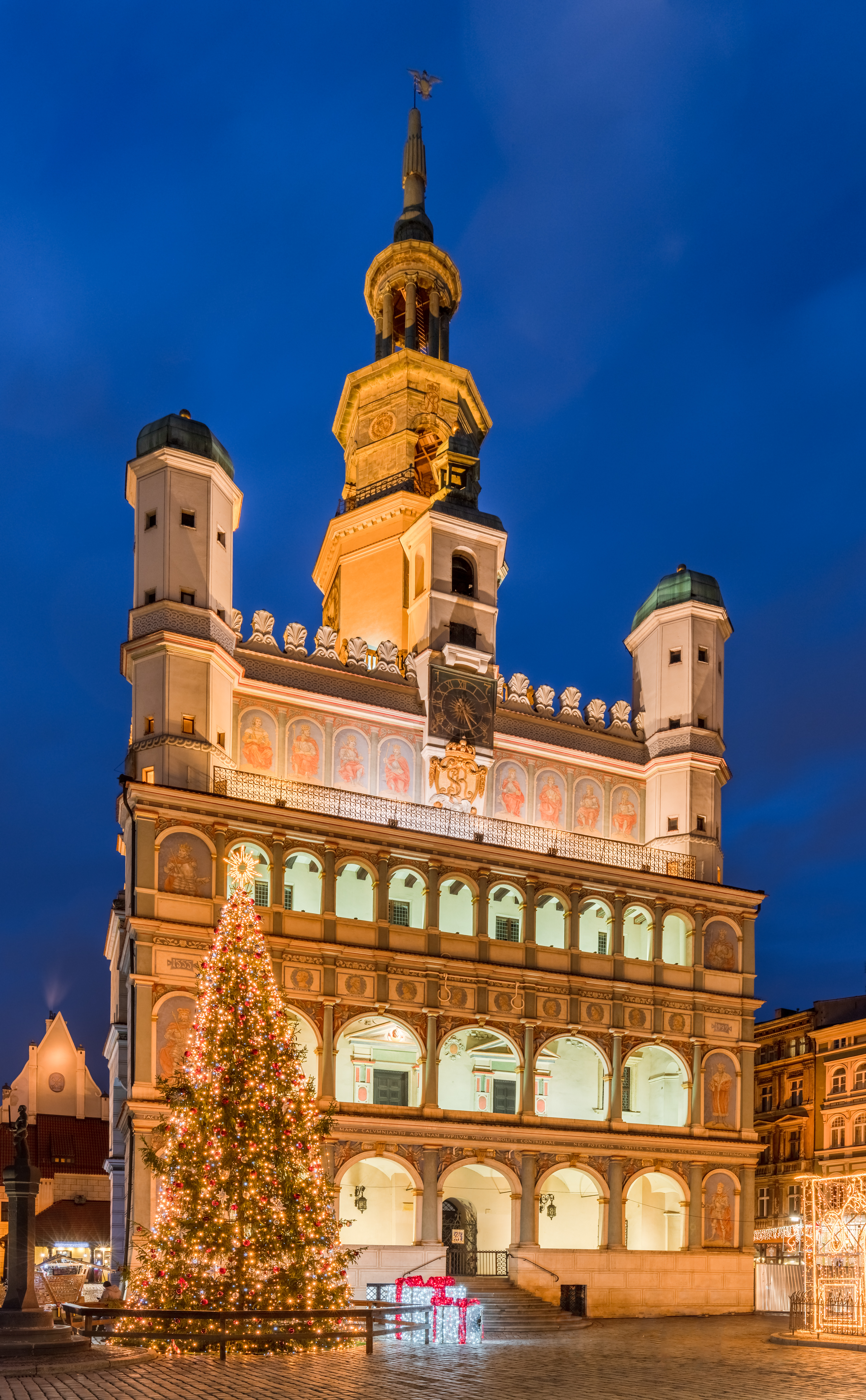
- Main façade of the building with arcade loggia
- Interactive map of the Poznań Town Hall area

General information
- Architectural style: Late Renaissance (Mannerism)
- Location: Poznań, Poland
- Coordinates: 52°24′31″N 16°56′3″E
- Construction started: 1550
- Completed: 1560

Design and construction
- Architects: Giovanni Battista di Quadro; Major reconstruction

Historic Monument of Poland
- Designated: 2008-11-28
- Part of: Poznań – historic city center
- Reference no.: Dz.U. 2008 nr 219 poz. 1401

Poznań Town Hall (Polish: ratusz w Poznaniu) is a historic city hall in the city of Poznań, Poland, located at the Poznań Old Town in the centre of the Old Market Square. It used to serve as the seat of local government until 1939, and now houses a museum. The town hall was originally built in the late 13th century following the founding of the medieval city in 1253; it was rebuilt in roughly its present-day form, in Mannerist style, with an ornate loggia, by Giovanni Battista di Quadro from 1550–1560. The display of mechanical fighting goats, played out daily at noon above the clock on the front wall of the building, is one of the city's main tourist attractions.

== History ==
The town hall was originally constructed as the administrative building of the city founded on the left bank of the Warta in 1253 (see History of Poznań). It was completed around 1300, during the reign of Wenceslaus II of Bohemia, and was first documented in Latin in 1310 as Domus Consulum. It was a one-storey Gothic building built upon a raised quadrangle. The cellars remain from this period of construction. The building was extended in the 15th century, and at the turn of the century a tower was built at the north-western corner. The interior was remodeled between 1504 and 1508.

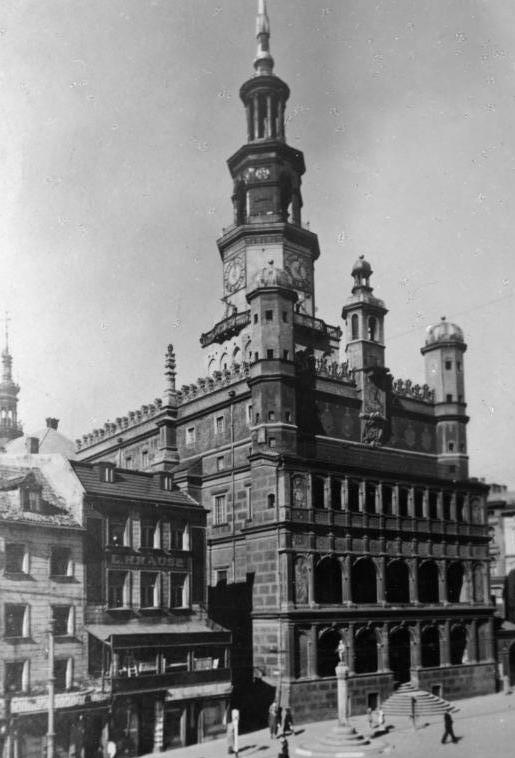
The Town Hall in around 1910, under the German Empire

In 1536 Poznań suffered a major fire, which seriously damaged the town hall. Repair work was carried out from 1540 to 1542, particularly to the tower, but it remained unsafe. In 1550 the city council commissioned Giovanni Battista di Quadro to carry out major repairs. The work lasted until 1560. Di Quadro added an upper storey, extended the building towards the west, and added attic walls and a three-storey loggia. A new clock (installed 1551) was made with three full faces and one half-face, and with goats added as a "comic element" (see next section).

In 1675 the tower, clock and goats were destroyed by lightning. The tower was rebuilt in 1690 to a height of 90 metres (300 ft). The top of the tower was destroyed by a hurricane in 1725. From 1781–1784, the building had a large renovation thanks to the efforts of the city's "Committee of Good Order", and it obtained the basic form which it presents today. A Classical-style tower roof was designed by Bonawentura Solari, topped by a white eagle with a two-metre wingspan. On the eastern elevation Franciszek Cielecki painted Jagiellonian kings, and under the central turret a cartouche was placed with the king's initials: SAR (Stanislaus Augustus Rex).

The next major renovation lasted from 1910–1913 (during a period of German rule), when black rustication was used to give the building a more "northern German" style. The original late renaissance polychromy was destroyed. An additional storey was added and the goats, which had been absent since 1675, were restored to the tower in 1913. In October 1943 the Town Hall was the scene of Heinrich Himmler's Posen speeches. Following major damage in the Battle of Poznań (1945), the Town Hall was again rebuilt in 1945–1954, when the Renaissance character of the elevations was restored (and extracts from the constitution of the Polish People's Republic were added to the text displayed on the attic wall). The eagle, which had been kept hidden during the war, was returned to the tower in 1947. The mechanism that drives the goats was replaced in 1954, and again at the end of the century. Renovation carried out in 1992–2002 largely restored the building to its post-1784 appearance.

== The goats and bugle call ==
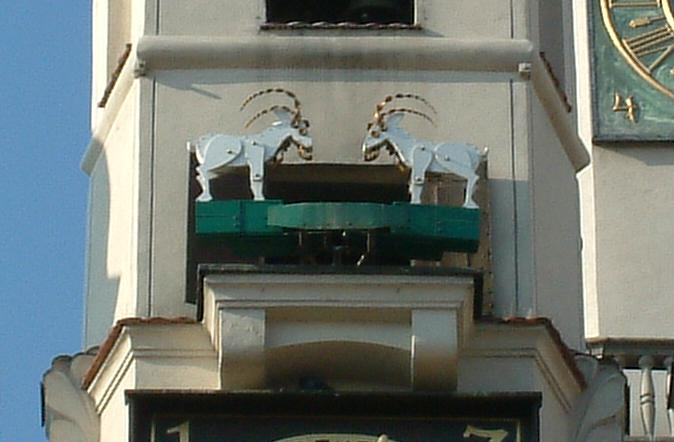
The mechanized goats (koziołki), which butt heads daily at noon

Today the mechanical goats' butting display is performed daily at noon, preceded by the striking of the clock and the playing of a traditional bugle call (hejnał). At other hours between 7 am and 9 pm the same call is played on a carillon, installed in the tower in 2003. The daily appearance of the goats is one of Poznań's best-known tourist attractions.

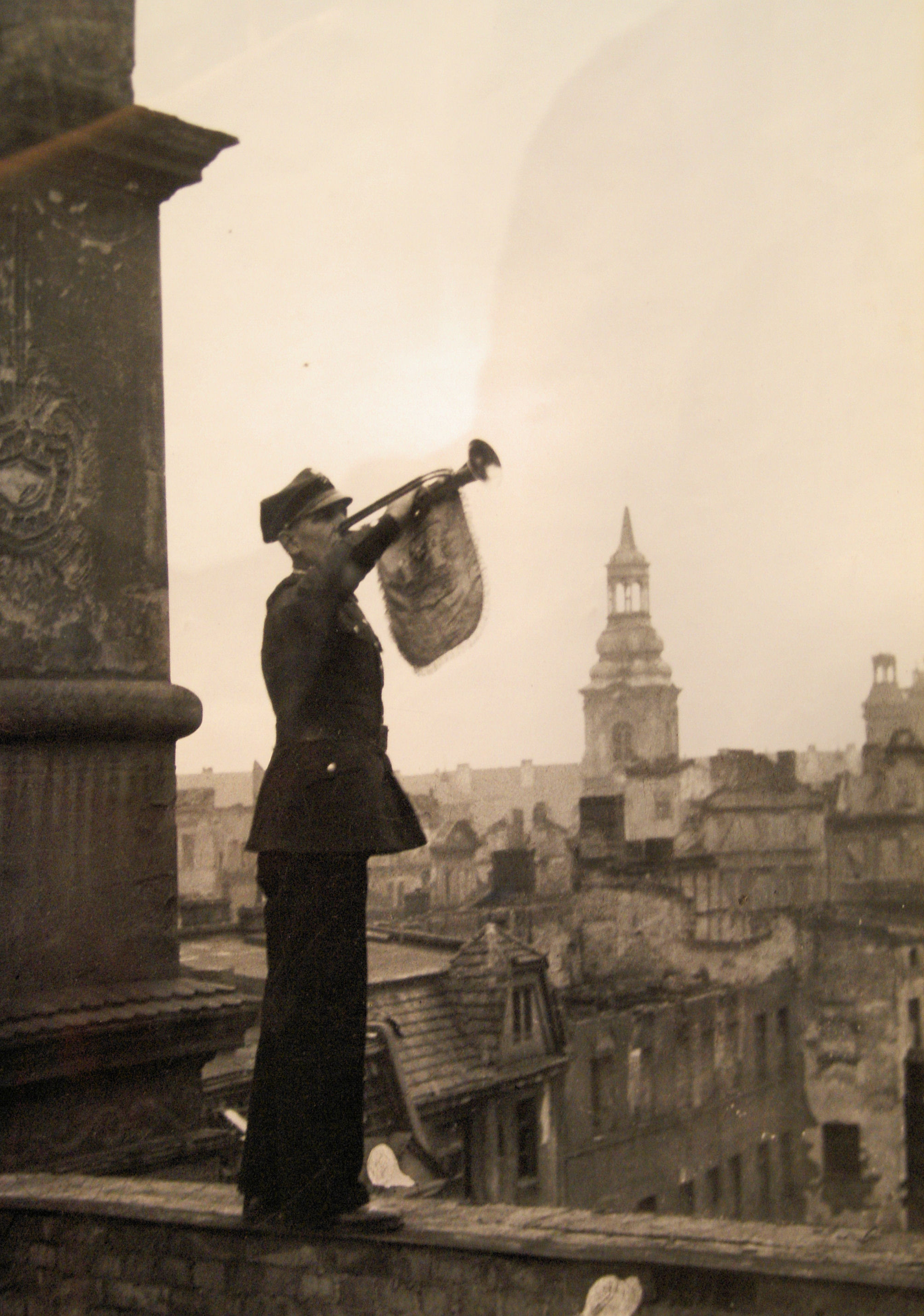
Poznań bugle call

A legend behind the original addition of the goats to the clock mechanism states that a cook, while preparing a banquet for the voivode and other dignitaries, had burnt a roast deer, and attempted to replace it by stealing two goats from a nearby meadow. The goats escaped and ran up the town hall tower, where they attracted the attention of the townspeople when they began to butt each other (according to some versions, this drew attention to a fire which might otherwise have done significant damage). Because of the entertainment provided, the voivode pardoned both the cook and the goats, and ordered that two mechanical goats be incorporated into the new clock being made for the building.

Another legend is associated with the hejnał. This says that Bolko, son of the tower's trumpeter, once took care of a raven whose wing had been shot through. The boy was then awoken at night by a gnome wearing a crown and purple cape, who thanked the boy for his kindness and handed him a small gold trumpet, telling him to blow it when in danger. After these words the gnome transformed into a raven and flew away. Years later, after Bolko had taken his father's place as trumpeter, when an attacking army was scaling Poznań's walls, Bolko remembered the present, ran to the top of the tower and began to play the trumpet. Dark clouds began to gather on the horizon, which turned out to be an enormous flock of ravens that fell upon the attacking army and forced it to retreat. The trumpet was lost when Bolko dropped it in his astonishment, but the call which he played is still performed.

== Rooms ==
The interior of the town hall consists of cellars, a ground floor and two upper storeys. The building currently serves as a Museum of the History of the City of Poznań (Muzeum Historii Miasta Poznania), a subdivision of the National Museum in Poznań.

=== Cellars and ground floor ===
The cellars were built between the 13th and 14th centuries. There was originally one large room with a supporting column in the centre; this was later divided into four rooms. Keystones feature the coat of arms of Poznań (crossed keys) and the Bohemian coat of arms (white lion with double tail) of Wenceslaus II. Until the 17th century the cellars were used to store goods, and in the 17th and 18th centuries they contained a prison and torture chamber. In the 19th century they were in use as a restaurant. They were later used as museum rooms, and are currently being renovated.

The ground-floor rooms were originally built in Gothic style, but rebuilt in Renaissance style by G. B. di Quadro; only one room retains the original vault. The architect also added two rooms with lunette vaults. One of the original uses of these rooms was for the town archives.

=== Upper floors ===
The second floor of the building was originally used for utility functions; following World War II damage it was rebuilt as exhibition space, with ceilings modelled on those from the houses on the Old Market Square. However the first floor contained the grandest rooms, used for official purposes by the city's authorities – these include the Great Hall (Vestibule), the Royal Hall and the Courtroom, described below.

==== Great Hall ====
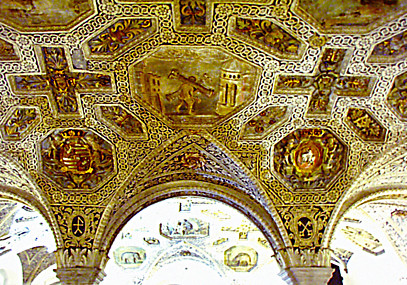
Renaissance stucco decorations in the Great Hall

The Great Hall or Vestibule is designed in Renaissance style by G. B. di Quadro. It was originally used for important sittings of the city court. Over the entrance is a quotation from Aristotle's Politics, and on the hall side a quotation from the Third Psalm. The hall retains its original vaults with lunettes, supported by two columns and by corbels. The coffers and columns are ornamented (the ornamentation on the ceiling is sgraffito). The coffers in the northern part of the room have polychrome stucco decoration showing Hercules and Samson, David and Goliath, and Marcus Curtius. The lower coffers show the coats of arms of Poland, Lithuania, the House of Sforza (Bona Sforza was Polish queen consort to 1548), the Habsburgs (Catherine Habsburg was queen consort from 1553) and Poznań, as well as an angel holding a board with the date 1555, the year the work was completed. Artists' signatures, house marks and representations of their tools can also be found. The southern part contains representations of animals and legendary creatures (elephant, lion, leopard, eagle, rhinoceros, griffin, Pegasus) and deities signifying heavenly bodies (the sun, the moon, Mercury, Venus, Mars, Jupiter and Saturn in the Ptolemeic system. Also in cross-shaped coffers are the heads of Moses and of Christ, the latter accompanied by another house mark.

On the western wall are two portals dating from 1508, which combine Gothic and Renaissance features. Gold-plated doors contain the Bohemian coat of arms, possibly dating from the time of Wenceslaus II. Notable exhibits include a Venetian globe (1688), and busts of Roman emperors from the third and fourth centuries, excavated in Italy in the 18th century.

The hall is currently used for concerts and for special weddings.

==== Royal Hall ====
The Royal Hall (Sala Królewska) was once richly decorated similarly to the Great Hall, and was used for meetings of the city council. It was partly restored in 1954 following war damage. Its name derives from the portraits of kings which once decorated the hall (the portraits on display today come from the National Museum's collections). The hall features a Renaissance sandstone fireplace (1541), moved here from the adjoining weighing house when that building was demolished in 1890 (it was rebuilt in its original style after World War II). There is also a portal dating from 1536, moved from a house on the Old Market Square (Stary Rynek 87).

==== Courtroom ====
The sala sądowa (courtroom) was used for minor court hearings. It retains Renaissance "mirror vaults", with polychrome decoration dating from between the late 16th and early 19th centuries. On the northern wall are personifications of four continents. On the wall to the right of the entrance is the painting Aeropagus Maioris Poloniae by Wacław Graff, which alludes to a court of 1726. Opposite the entrance is a marble statue of king Stanisław II Augustus, dating from 1783.

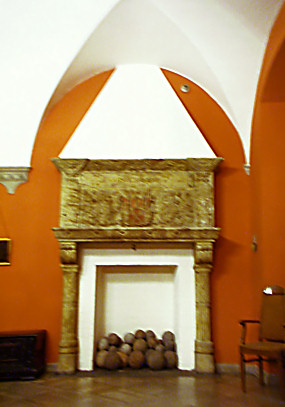
Fireplace in the Royal Hall

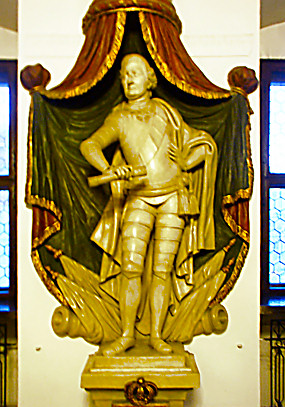
Poniatowski's statue in the Courtroom

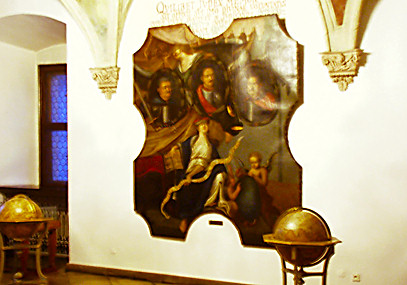
Aeropagus Maioris Poloniae

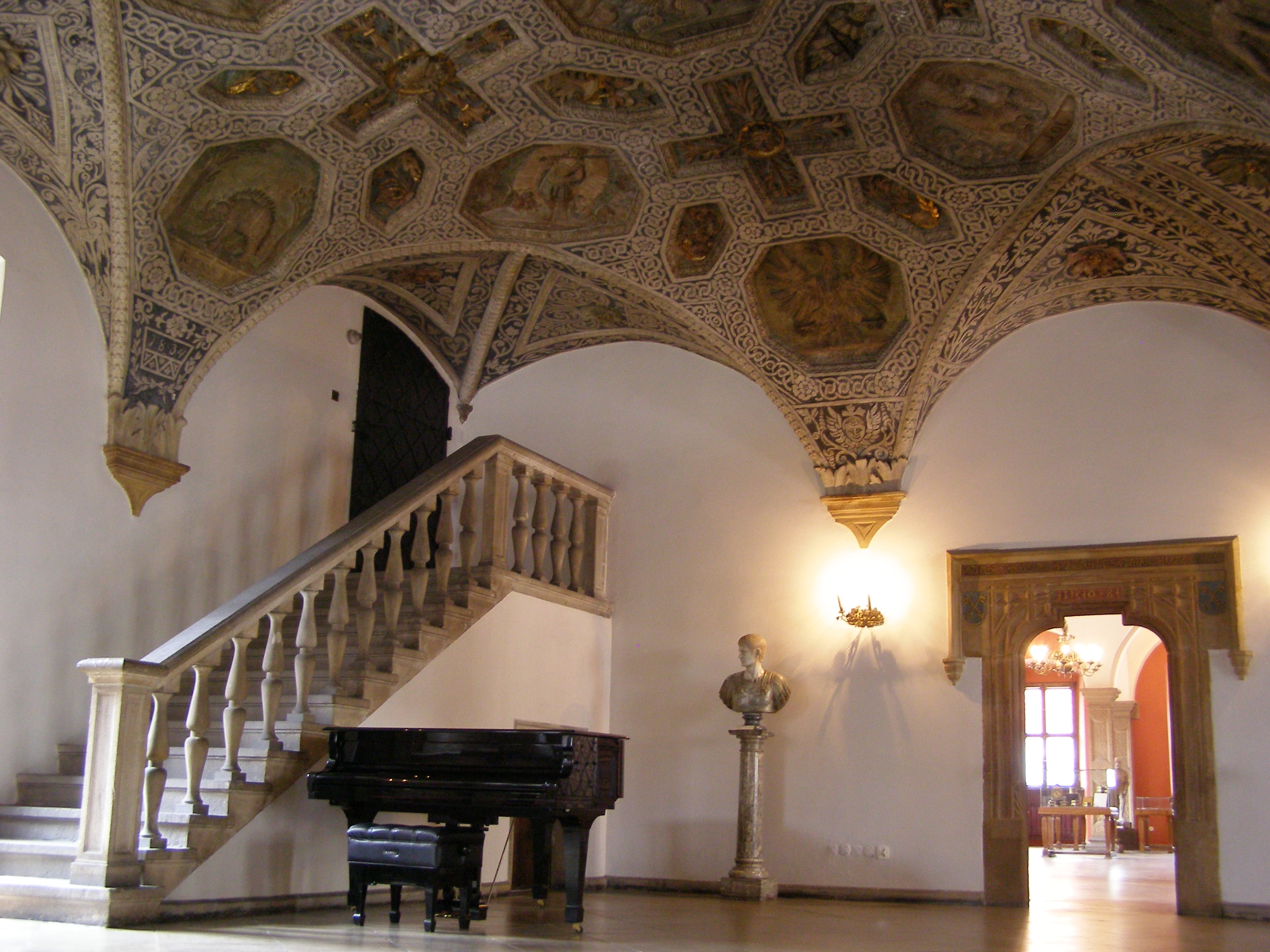
The Great Hall (reception)

== External features ==
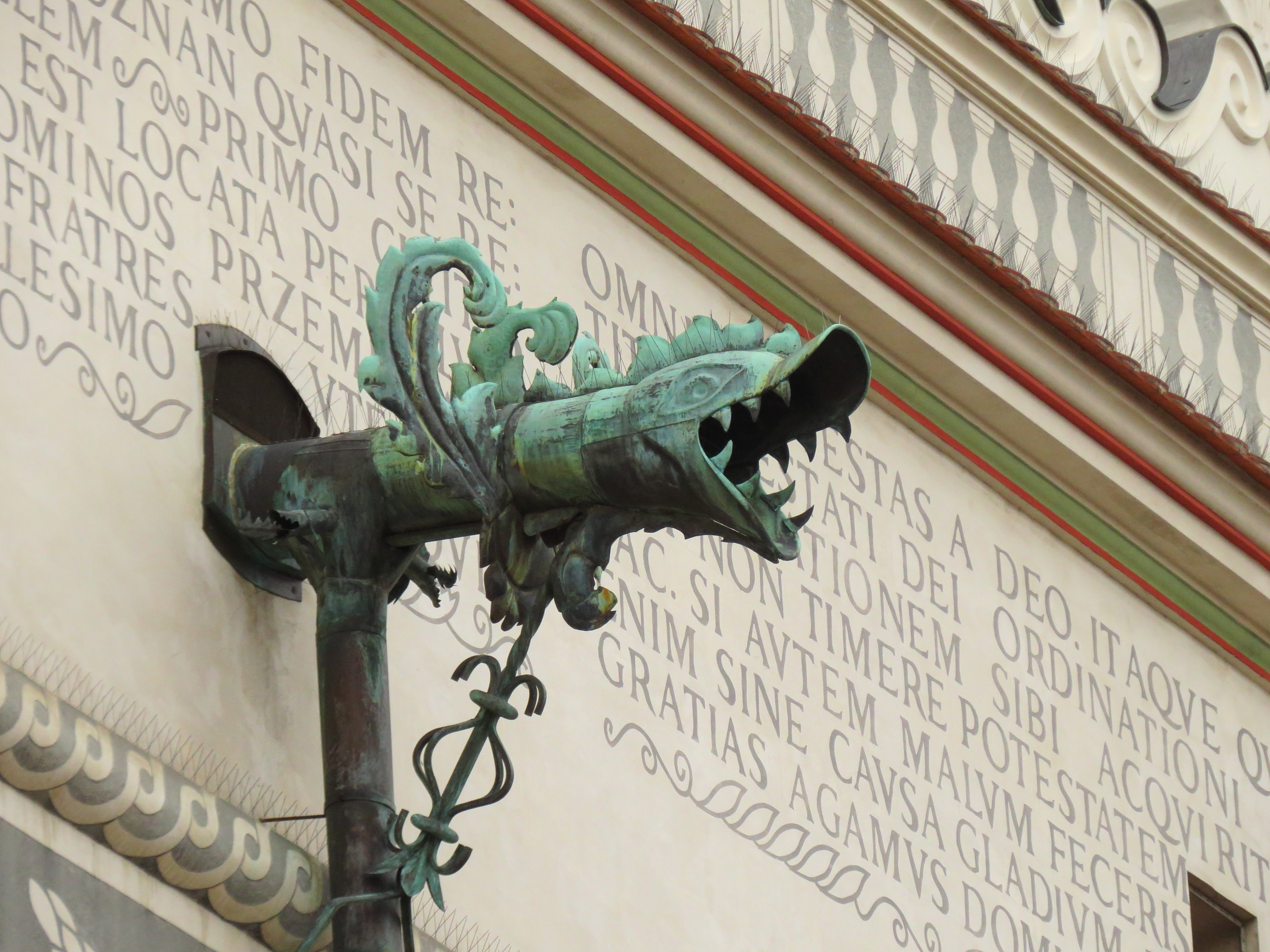
One of the dragon-headed gargoyles on the exterior

The front of the building, facing east, features an ornately decorated, three-storey loggia. Between the arcade columns on the ground floor are five pairs of female figures, the first four pairs representing virtues: patience (paciencia), with a lamb and prudence (prudencia) with a mirror; charity (charitas) with two children and justice (iusticia) with scales and a sword; faith (fides) with a chalice and sword and hope (spes) with a thurible and the sun; and courage (fortitudo) with a broken column and temperance (temperancia) pouring water from a vase into a bowl. The last pair is of two famous women from the Ancient World: Lucretia (Lucrecia) with a spear through her own breast, and Cleopatra (Cleapairi), with snakes twisted around her arms.

Between the ground and first floors runs a fresco in Latin text serving as a warning to judges. Below the first floor there is a series of medallions with figures from the Ancient World: the brothers Gaius Gracchus and Tiberius Sempronius Gracchus, Lucius Junius Brutus, Archimedes, Vitruvius, Virgil, Homer, Justinian I, Horace, Spartacus, and the tyrannicides Harmodius and Aristogeiton.

Above the loggia is an attic wall, which features a list of rulers of the Jagiellonian Dynasty from Władysław II Jagiełło and Jadwiga of Poland to Sigismund II Augustus. In the centre is a small tower, at the foot of which the goats appear for their daily display. Below this is a clock, connected with the mechanism that controls the goats. Below that is the monogram of Stanisław II Augustus ("SAR").

== See also ==
- List of mannerist structures in Central Poland
- Museum of the History of Poznań
