= Giovanni Battista di Quadro =

Italian renaissance architect

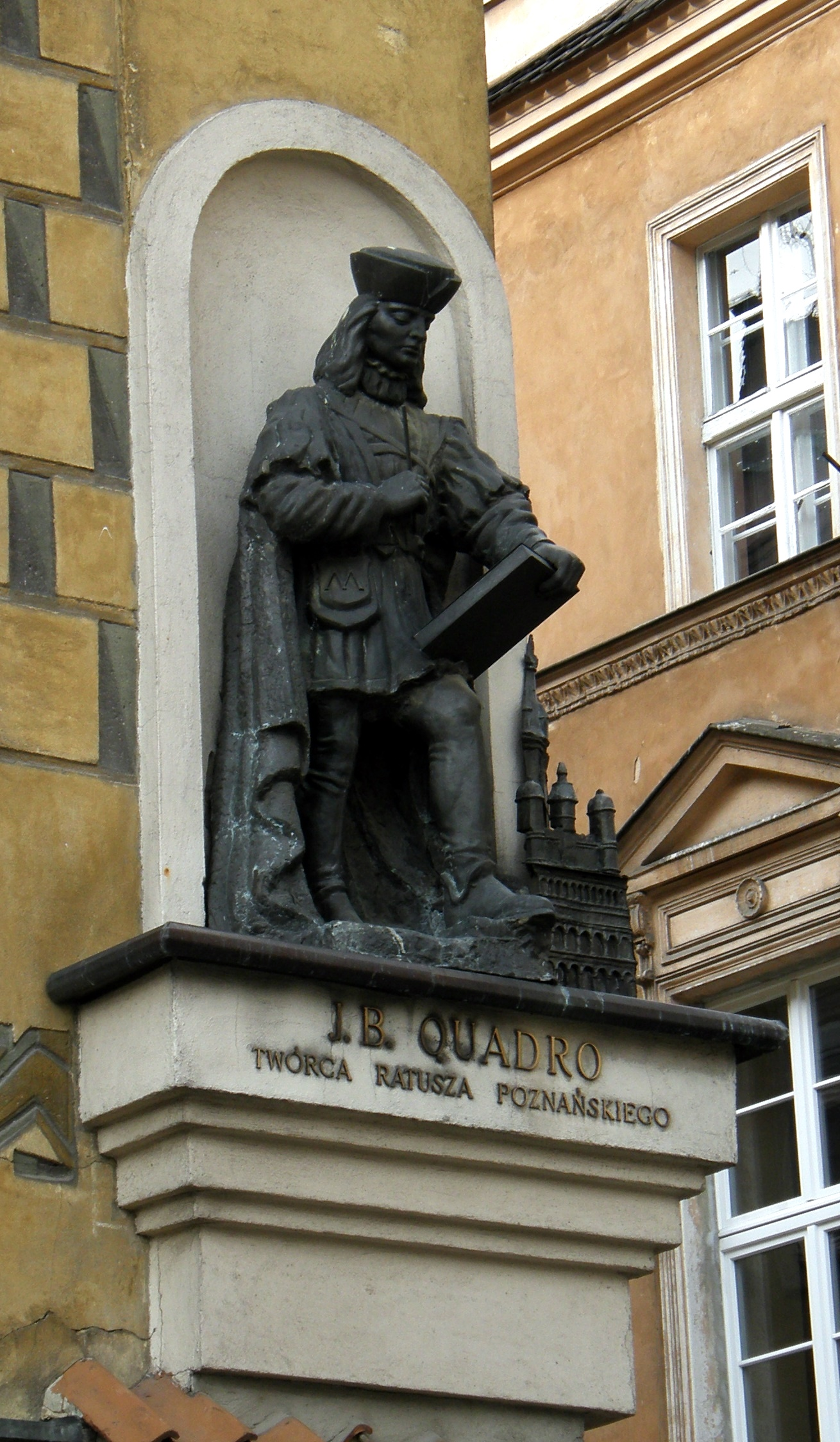
Giovanni Battista di Quadro of Lugano - creator of the Poznań City Hall

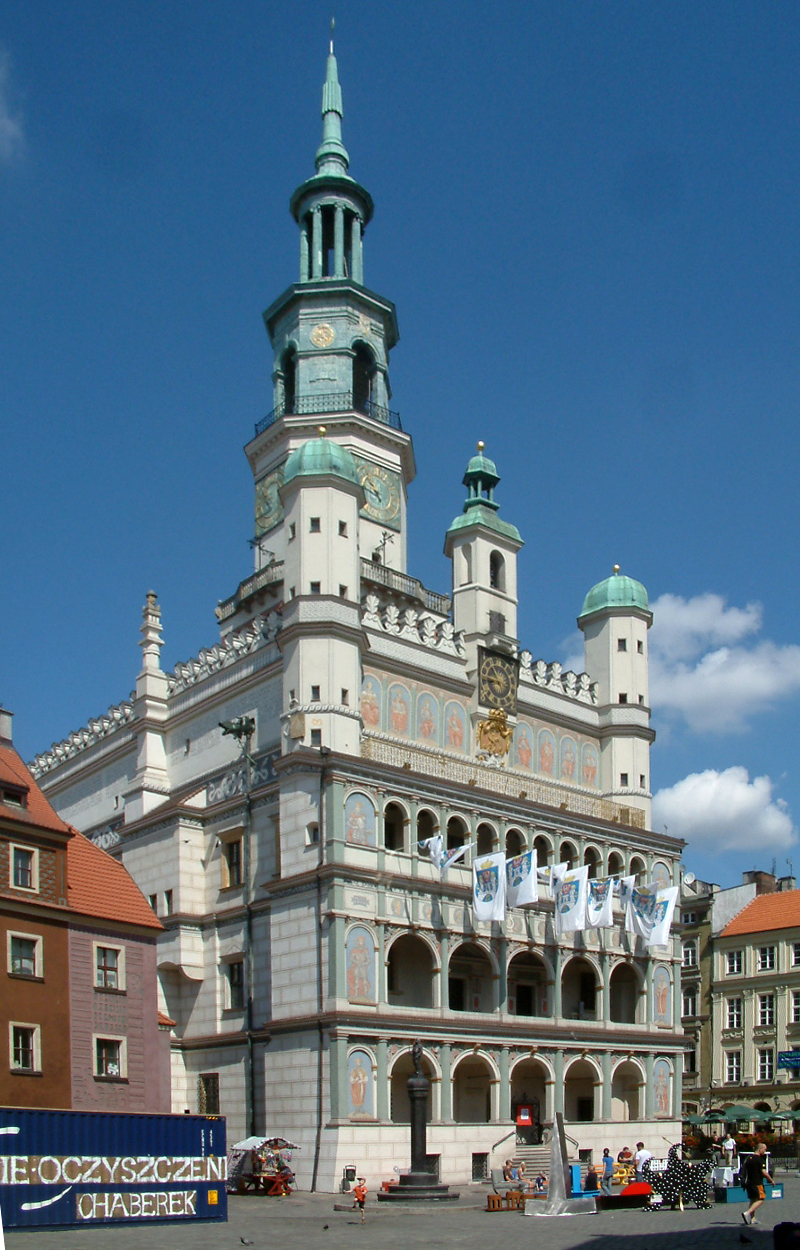
Town hall, Poznań

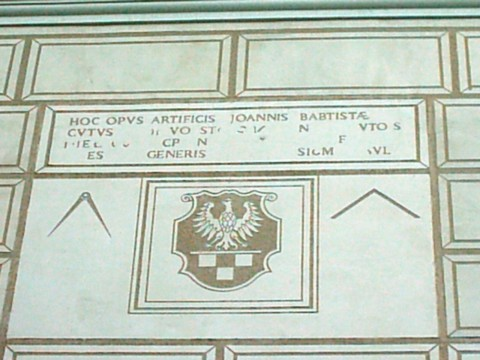
Coat of arms of G. B. di Quadro on town hall in Poznań

Giovanni Battista di Quadro (Polish: Jan Baptysta Quadro, Latin: Joannes Baptista Quadro; died between 10 April 1590 and 16 January 1591) was an Italian Renaissance architect active in Poland.

== Biography ==
He was born Ponte Tresa or Cadro, near Lugano (today Switzerland).

Until 1550, he probably worked in Saxony and Silesia, but on 13 March 1550, he signed a contract with the city council of Poznań for rebuilding the town hall. In 1551, with the agreement of the council, he went to Płock as a consultant on the renovation of the cathedral. In the same year, his name was mentioned in the court books of Poznań because of links between him and the Bishop of Poznań Benedykt Izdebski relating to building the bishop's palace in Krobia. From 1552 to 1562, di Quadro was the City Architect of Poznań, but the City Council also paid him in 1563, 1566, 1567, and 1570 for minor works. During these years, he worked for the citizens of Poznań and the clergy and nobles of Greater Poland.

From 1568 to 1572, he worked in Warsaw, rebuilding today's Royal Castle.

His many well-paid jobs made him wealthy. However, after he retired in 1573, he died as an indebted person in Poznań.

During the years 1550-1552, his brothers Antoni, Gabriel, and Kilian di Quadro also worked in Poznań.

== Works ==
=== Existing ===
- Poznań City Hall (reinessance rebuild in 1550 -1560)
- tomb of Bishop Adam Konarski in Poznań cathedral
- Building of Scale in Poznań (renaissance rebuild in 1563 and renovation in 1573. In 1890 Scale was demolished, but after World War II it was rebuilt on di Quadro's original plans.)

=== Disappeared ===
- private houses in Poznań
  - Stary Rynek 84 (after 1554)
  - Ślusarska Str. (1559)
  - Stary Rynek 39 (1561)
  - Stary Rynek 81 (1563)
  - Stary Rynek 52 (before 1579)
  - Plac Kolegiacki (since 1568, not finished. Renovated, probably based on his project in years 1958-1960)
- Royal Castle in Warsaw (1568–1572) (reproductions of his original work is visible)
- House of priests of St. Stanislaus in Poznań (Za Bramką Str., 1571 - 1574)
- minor works in Poznań cathedral

=== Probable ===
Works (existing and no longer existing) attributable to him, on analysis of style and unverified documents):

- Chapel of Kościeleccy family in Kościelec near Inowrocław (about 1559)
- private house on Wrocławska Str. 11 in Poznań
- gate and tower of bridge in Łacina (today Poznań) (1560)
- renovation of tower of not existing Poznań Collegiate church
- Jesuits College in Poznań (1572)
- Shearing hall w Poznaniu
- Cloth hall in Poznań
- Trade hall w Poznaniu (1563)
