= Poznań Goats =

Tourist attraction of Poznań, Poland

Coordinates: 52°24′31″N 16°56′3″E

Koziołki poznańskie
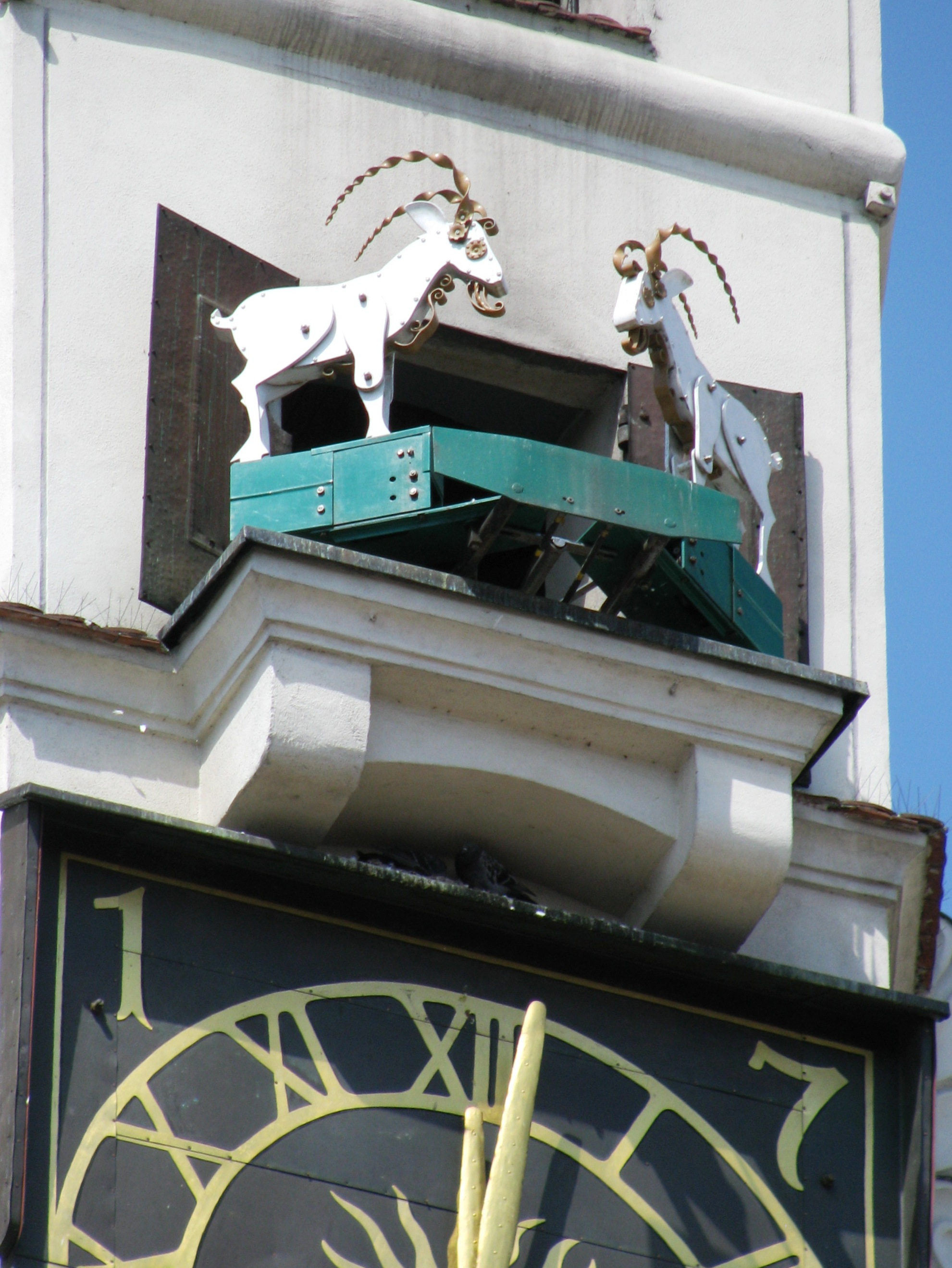
- Year: 1551: original clock 1913: current version
- Type: Automaton clock
- Location: Poznań, Poland

The Poznań Goats (Polish: Koziołki poznańskie) are one of the tourist attractions of Poznań. This pair of mechanical goats butt heads every day at 12:00 on the tower of the Poznań City Hall.

== Legend ==
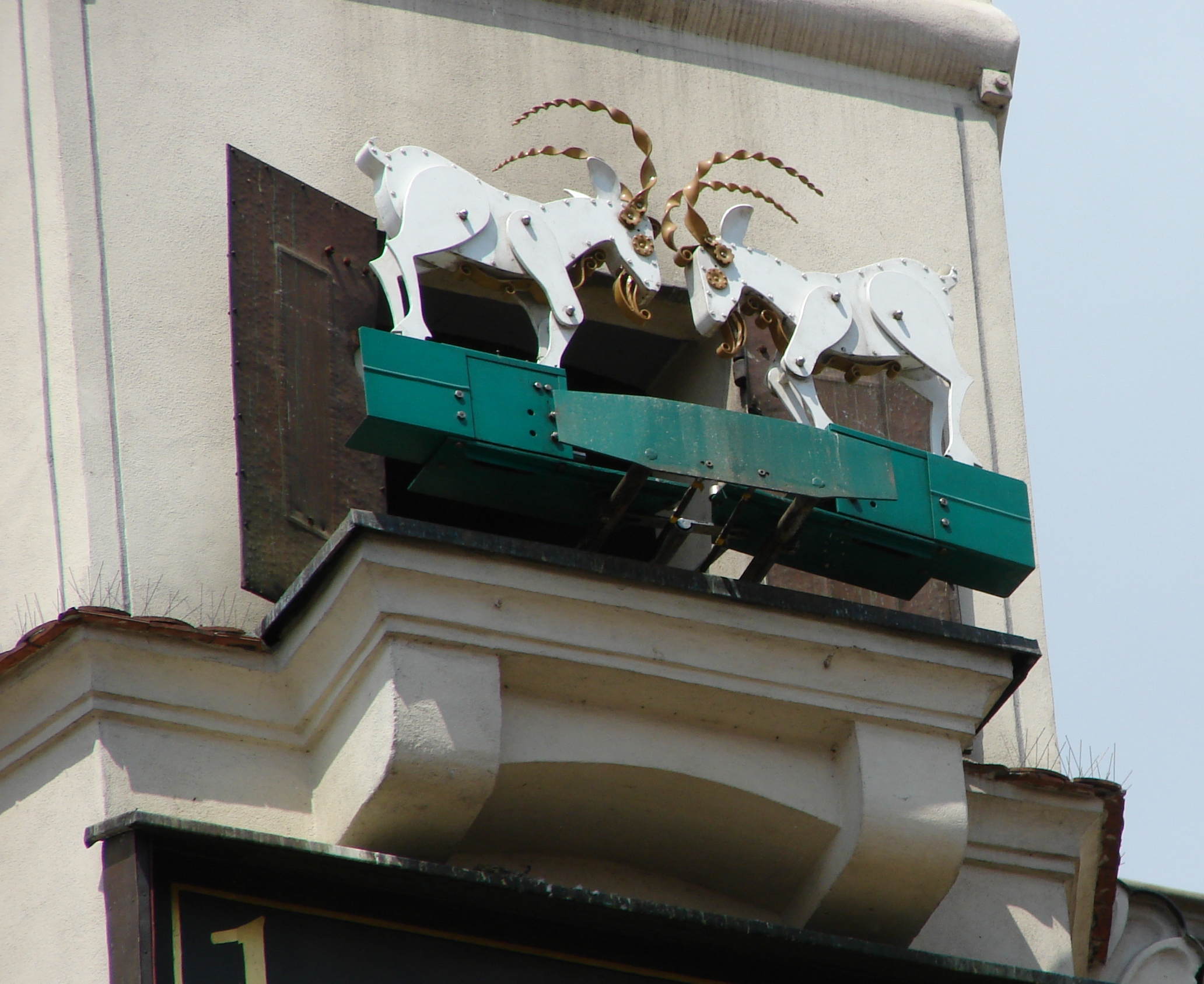
The goats butting heads

According to one version of the folk legend, when the Poznań town hall was rebuilt after a large fire, the clock for its tower was ordered from one Master Bartholomew of Gubin. The town council decided to celebrate this important event. A young cook, Pietrek, was appointed to prepare the main dish for a feast. Pietrek was curious about what the clock mechanism looks like, so he left the kitchen. In his absence, the deer leg he was cooking fell into the fire. The terrified boy ran to a nearby meadow where the inhabitants of the city kept their animals. From there, he kidnapped two goats and took them to the town hall kitchen. The goats, however, escaped from Pietrek to the cornice of the town hall tower. There, in front of the gathered townsmen, two small white goats started butting. This sight amused the voivode and the invited guests. The mayor pardoned Pietrek, and the watchmaker was ordered to make a mechanism that would activate the clock goats every day. Since then, every day the trumpeter plays the bugle call and two buzzing goats show up.

The real goats did not reach the tables of city councilors and townsmen but were returned to the poor widow, their true owner.

== Monuments ==
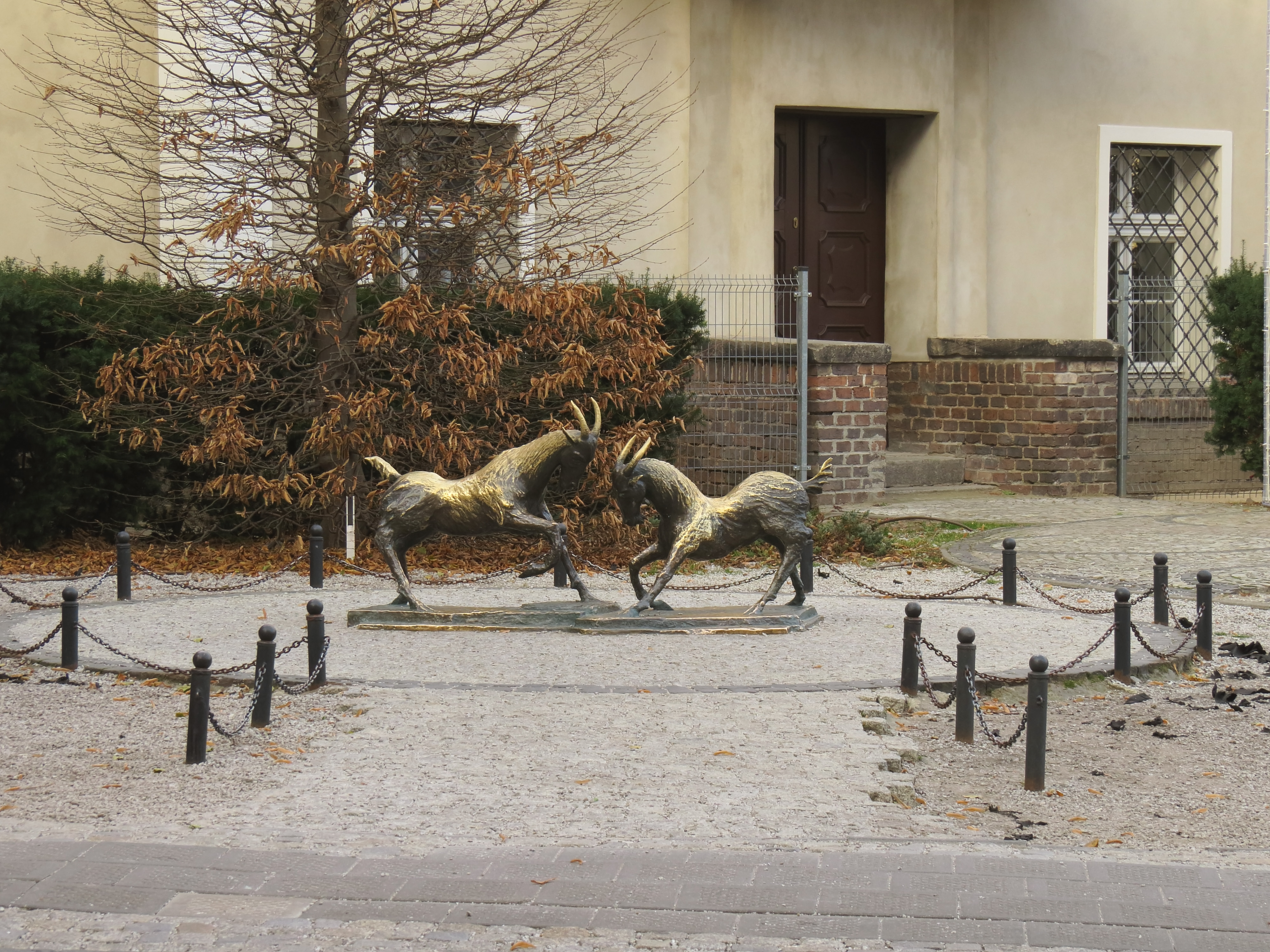
Goats sculpture

Goat sculpture is located on Collegiate Square, near the main entrance to the Municipal Office, the former Jesuit College. The sculpture was designed by Robert Sobociński in 2002. In 2019, due to renovations of the square, the goat sculpture was moved to Chopin Park.

The monument, due to its easy accessibility from the ground level and the possibility to sit on the backs of animals, is a popular place for tourists and residents to take souvenir photographs.

Another, modern and colorful goat installation is located on Piłsudskiego street, in Rataje.
