= Museum of the History of Poznań =

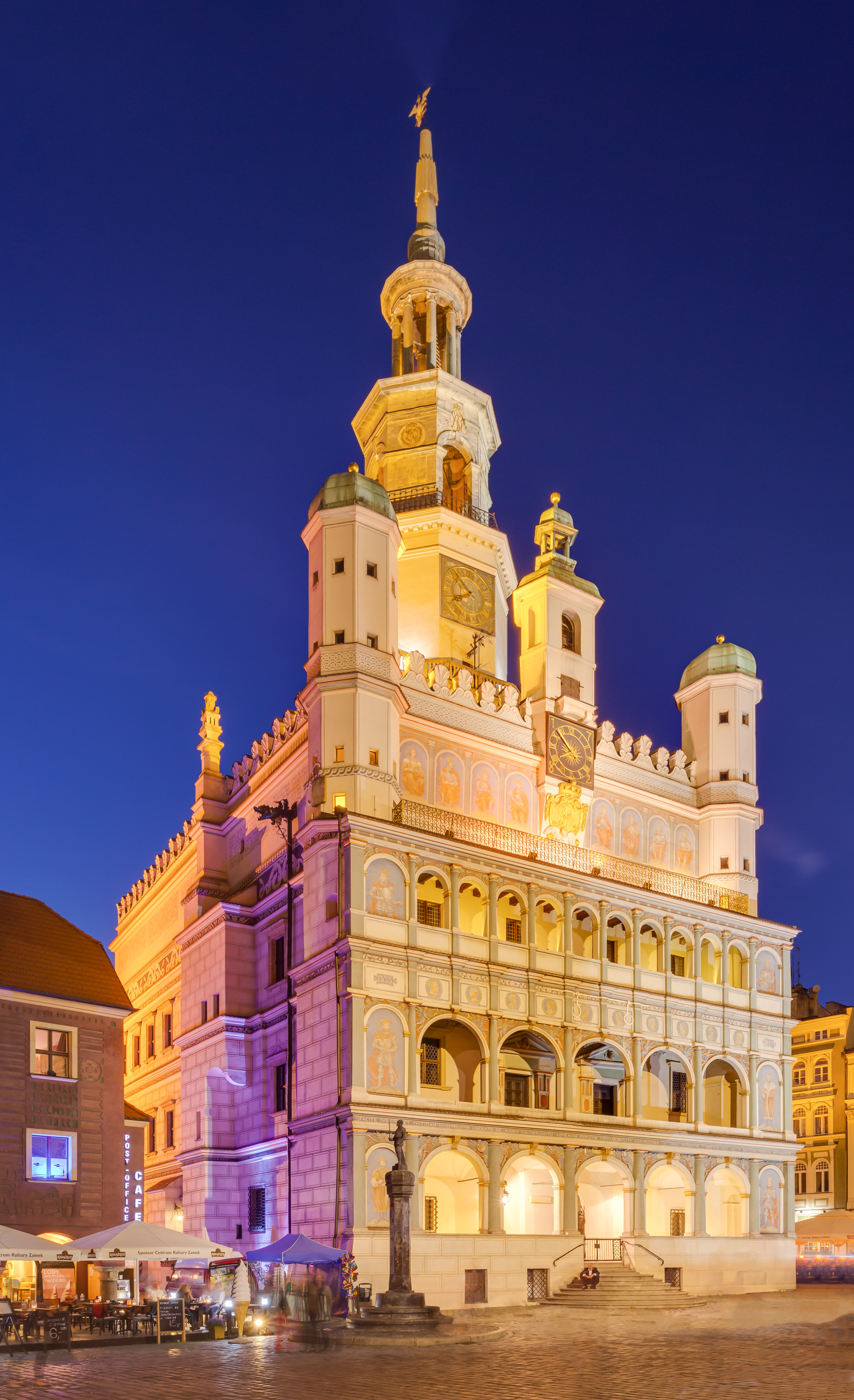
Poznań City Hall, located on the Old Market Square, used to serve as the Seat of local government until 1939, and now houses a museum

Museum of the History of the City of Poznań is a branch of the National Museum in Poznań, a museum devoted to the history of the city. It is located in the Poznań City Hall on the Old Market Square.

As a branch of the National Museum in Poznań, it is entered in the State Register of Museums kept by the minister in charge of culture and national heritage protection.

The exhibits are presented in the representative halls of the first floor, with the Renaissance Hall (the so-called Great Hall). Until 1997, the exhibitions also took place in the Gothic cellars, which are currently undergoing renovation. The permanent part is dedicated to the history of Poznań from 13th century to 1945.
