= Citadel Park =

Park in Poznań, Poland

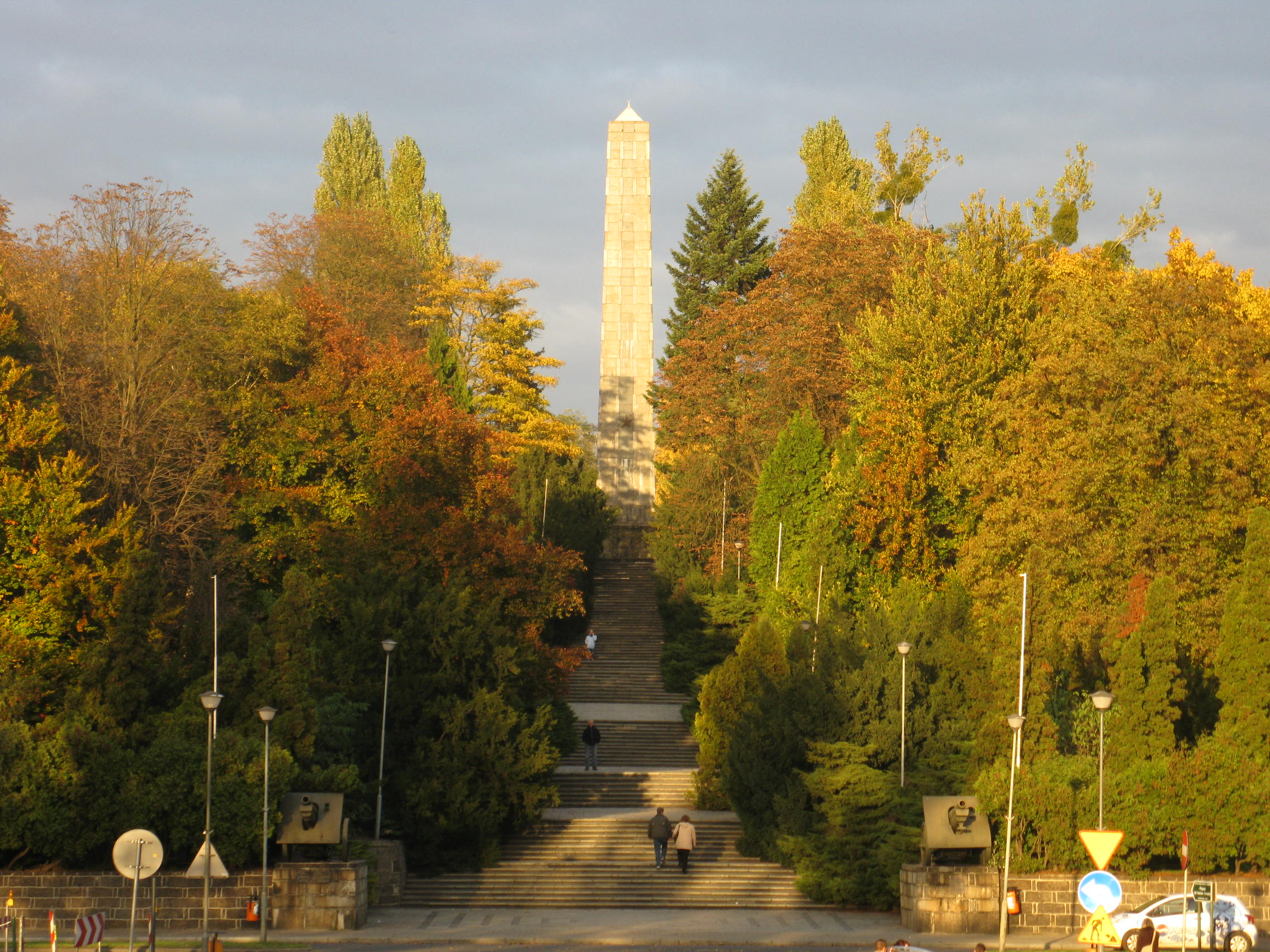
- The Heroes' Monument
- Interactive map of Citadel Park
- Location: Poznań, Poland
- Coordinates: 52°25′16″N 16°56′07″E
- Area: ca. 100 hectares (250 acres)
- Created: 1963–1970
- Opened: 1970
- Status: Open all year
- Designation: Historic Monument
- Public transit: Armii Poznań tram stop

The Citadel Park (Polish: Park Cytadela) in Poznań, Poland is a large park on the site of Fort Winiary, a 19th-century fortified area north of the city centre. It contains a military museum, military cemeteries, and the remains of some of the fortifications. It lies within the Stare Miasto district of the city, south of Winogrady.

The site is listed as one of Poland's official national Historic Monuments (Pomnik historii), as designated November 28, 2008, along with other portions of the city's historic core. Its listing is maintained by the National Heritage Board of Poland.

== The park and cemeteries ==
In the post-war period the site of the Fort Winiary was converted into Cytadela park. Most of the fortifications were demolished, although some structures can still be seen. The Spezial-Kriegs-Laboratorium building now houses a military museum. There is also a Poznań Army museum on the southern edge of the park. A rosarium is located near the northern edge of the park, and an amphitheatre (now disused) was built at the eastern end, on the site of Ravelin IV. The park contains a large number of walkways and open spaces, and various open-air sculpture displays.

On the slope on the south-western edge of the park are a series of military cemeteries. These include a Commonwealth cemetery ("Poznań Old Garrison Cemetery"), set up after World War I, and containing graves mostly of prisoners-of-war from World War I and airmen from World War II (many killed during bombing of Stettin, now Szczecin; but some – including at least one Polish airman, Pawel "Peter" Tobolski – murdered by the Gestapo after the "Great Escape" from Stalag Luft III in 1944). There are also Polish and Soviet cemeteries on the slope. A "Heroes' Monument" overlooks the cemeteries, standing at the top of the flight of steps which form the main entrance to the park.

== Gallery ==
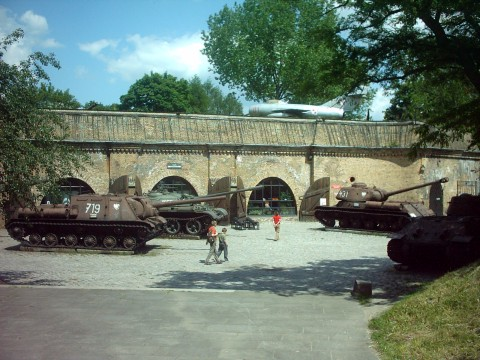
The military museum

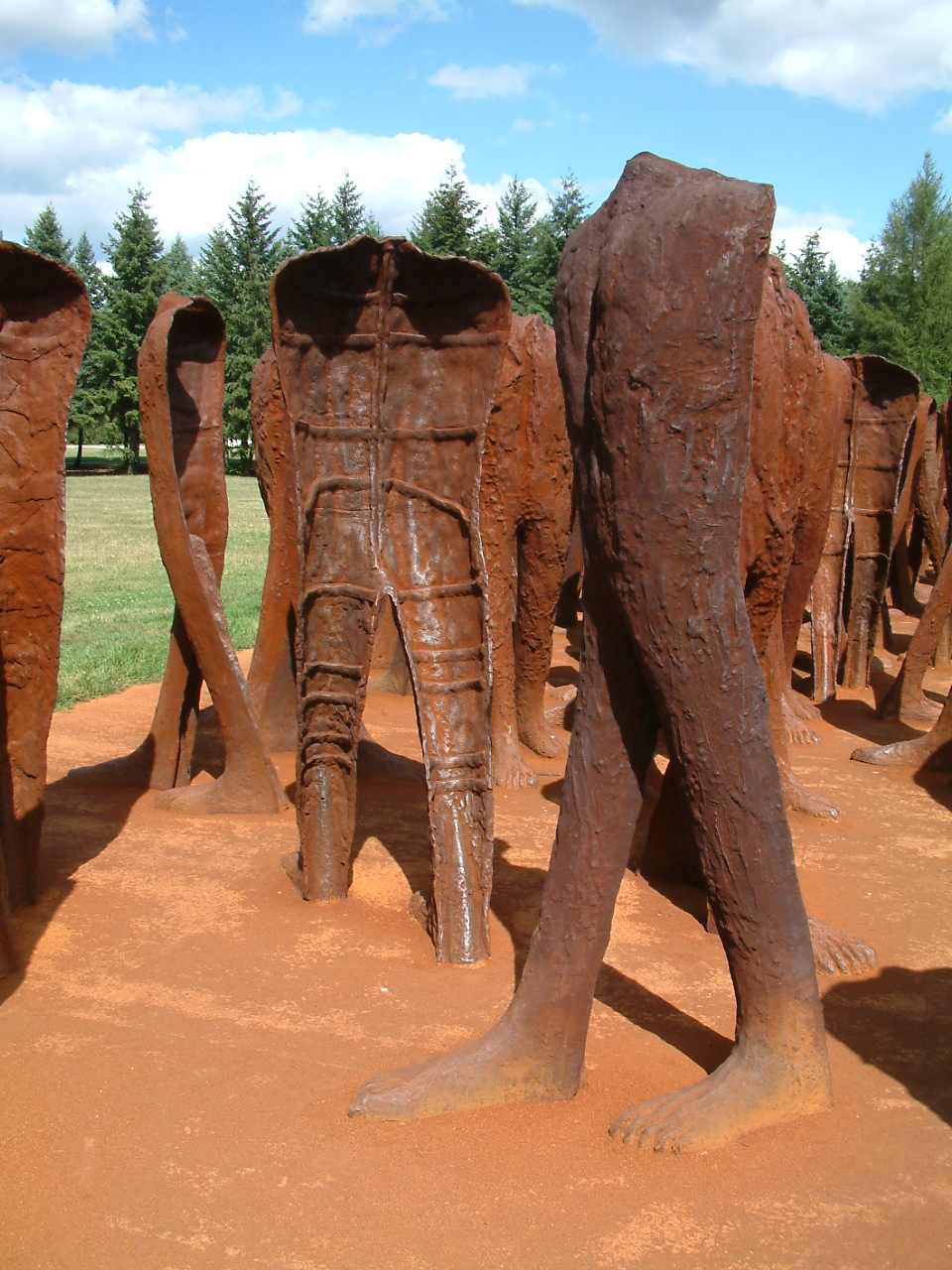
Sculpture display: Nierozpoznani ("The Unrecognized Ones") by Magdalena Abakanowicz

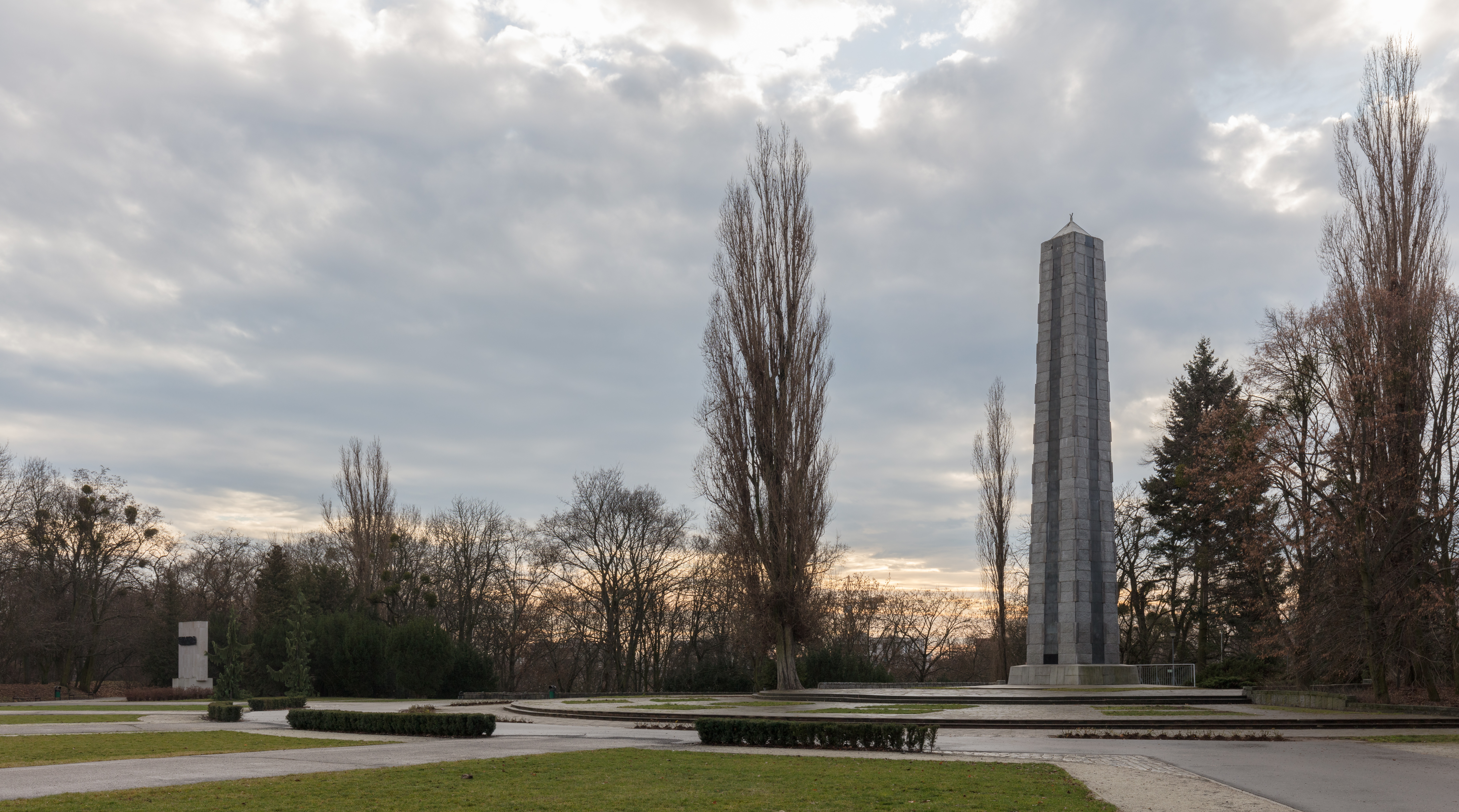
Heroes' Monument

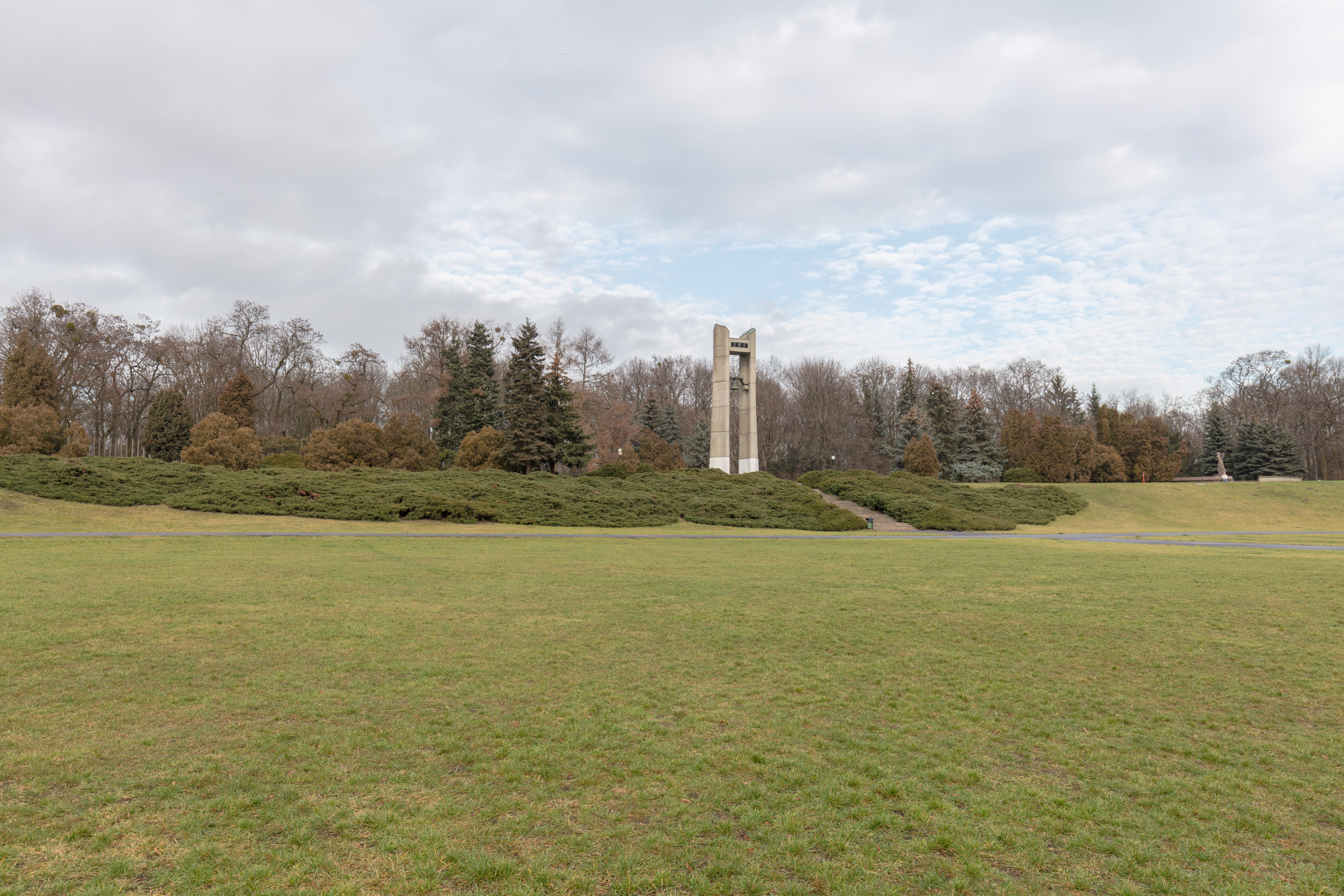
Peace Bell
