= Stare Miasto, Poznań =

District of Poznań, Poland

Coordinates: 52°26′53″N 16°56′01″E

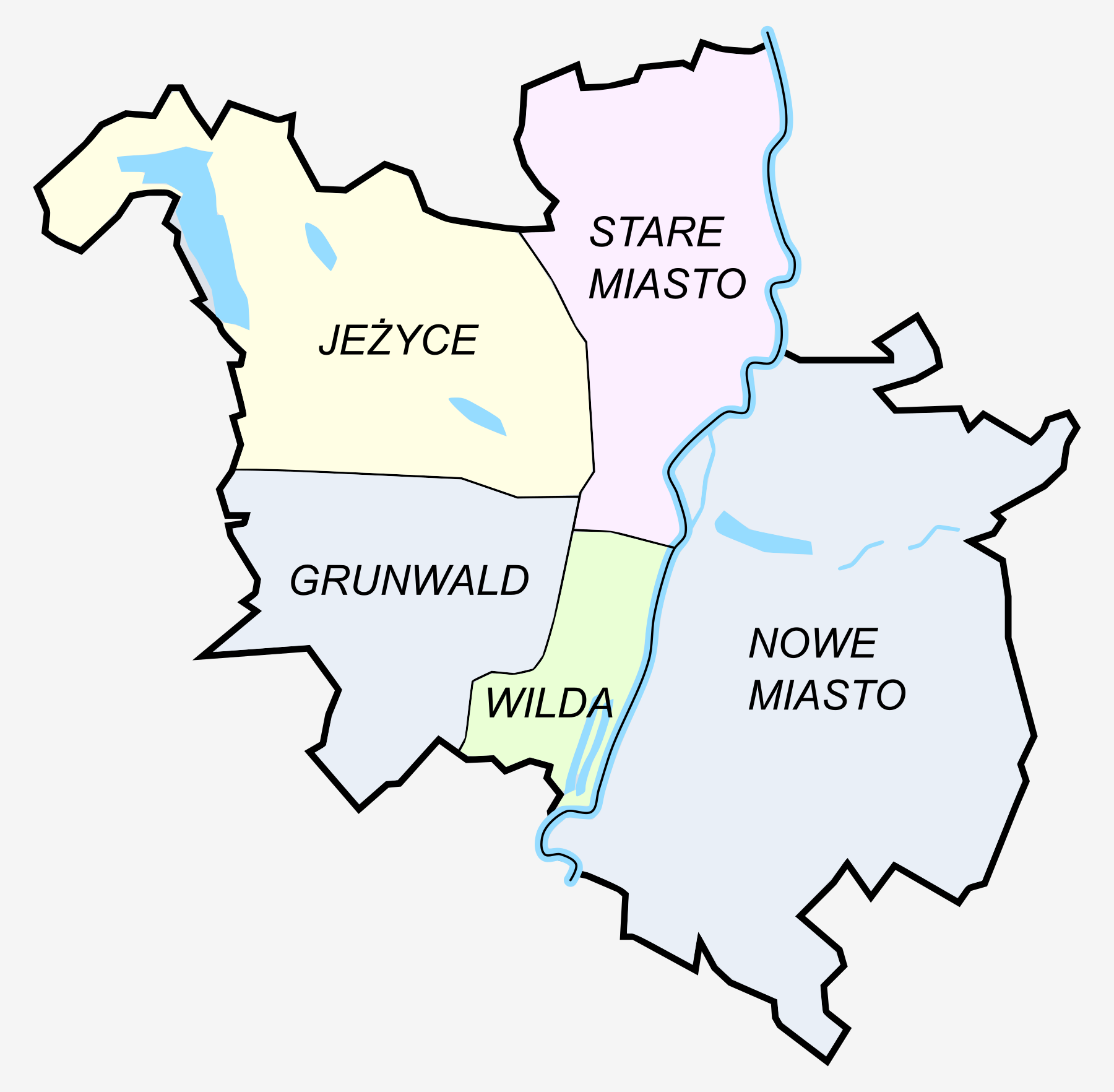
Former division of Poznań into five districts

Stare Miasto (Polish pronunciation: [ˈstarɛ ˈmjastɔ]) is a part of the city of Poznań in western Poland. It was one of the five governmental districts (dzielnicas) into which the city was divided prior to 1990, and which are retained for certain administrative purposes. For details, see Administrative division of Poznań.

The Polish name Stare Miasto means "Old Town". In discussing subdivisions of Poznań, the name is ambiguous; it may refer to:

- the whole area of the former dzielnica of Stare Miasto;
- the osiedle called Stare Miasto, covering most of the city centre; or
- the Poznań Old Town neighbourhood, covering only the area of the original walled city.

In this article, Stare Miasto will have the first of the above meanings. For the osiedles contained within this district, see Administrative division of Poznań.

The district of Stare Miasto includes Poznań Old Town and most of the remainder of the city centre, as well as the northern part of the city, including the modern residential areas of Winogrady and Piątkowo, and the less densely populated northernmost neighbourhoods of Morasko and Radojewo. It has an area of 47.1 square kilometres (18.2 sq mi) and a population of 161,200, making it the most populous of the city's five districts.

Stare Miasto borders the districts of Nowe Miasto ("New Town") to the east (across the Warta river), Wilda to the south, and Jeżyce and Grunwald to the west. It is also bordered by the administrative districts (gminas) of Suchy Las to the north and Czerwonak across the Warta (though without any direct crossing) to the east.

== Geography ==
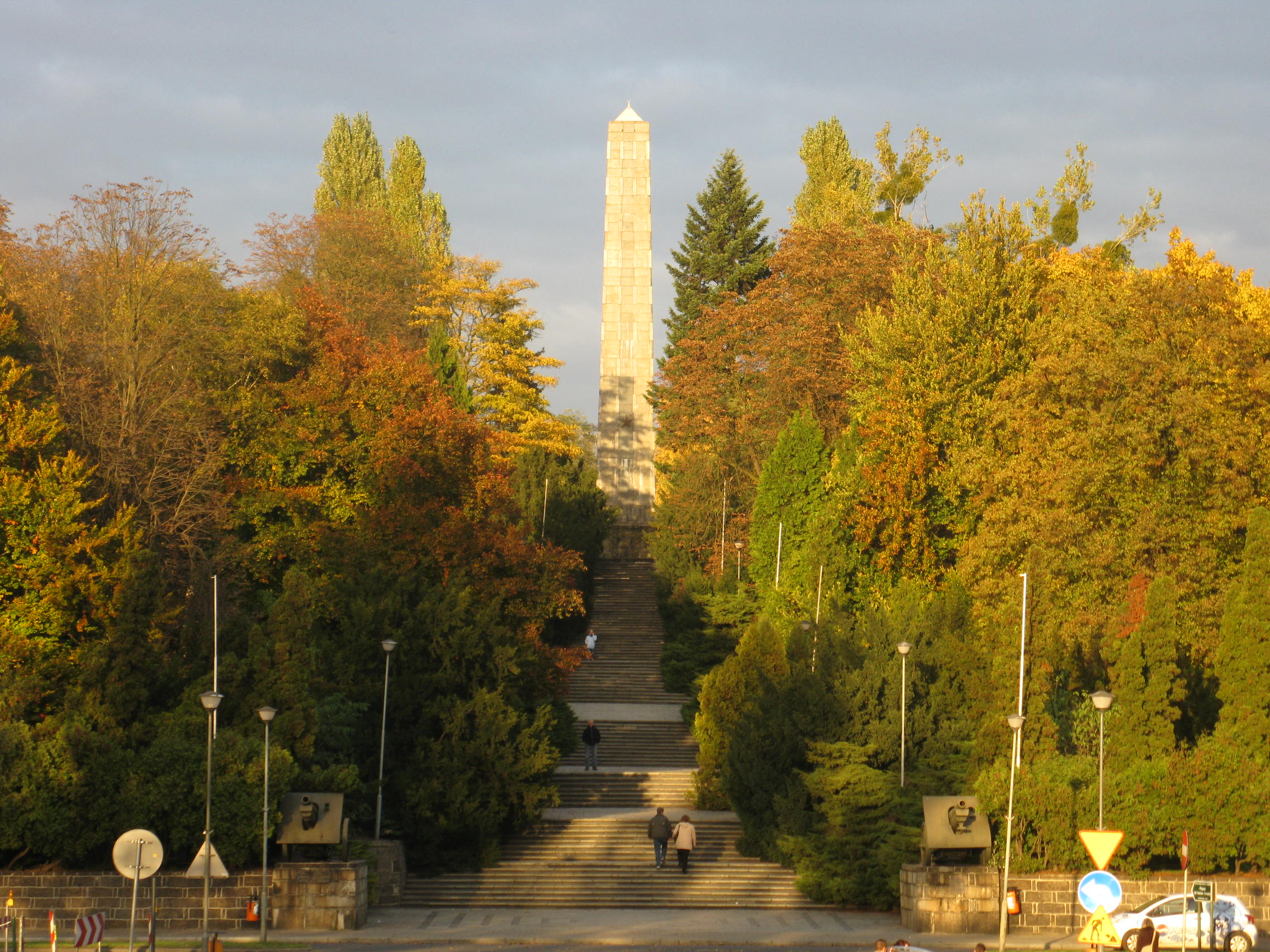
Monument overlooking the military cemeteries in the Cytadela

The southern part of Stare Miasto district is occupied by Poznań's city centre – the Old Town itself (centred on Stary Rynek, the Old Market Square, with the Old Town Hall or Ratusz), the main street Święty Marcin (St. Martin), the old district of Chwaliszewo next to the river, the oldest buildings of Adam Mickiewicz University, and numerous other historic and modern buildings. North of the centre is the Cytadela (citadel), formerly a fortified area, now an extensive park containing a military museum and a number of cultural exhibits, and with military cemeteries (including Commonwealth and Soviet cemeteries) on its southern edge.

North of the Cytadela is the old district of Winogrady, which contains mainly houses, and then the newer Winogrady estates, consisting largely of pre-fabricated concrete panel apartment blocks. North of these are the estates of Piątkowo, built in similar style. Piątkowo is also the site of the city's main television tower.

East of Winogrady, close to the river, is the neighbourhood of Szeląg, and north of this the housing estate of Wilczy Młyn. North of this is the Naramowice neighbourhood, and then Umultowo. West of Umultowo is the estate called Osiedle Różany Potok, named after Różany Potok or Strumień Różany ("Rose Stream") which flows eastwards towards the Warta, also giving its name to the small neighbourhood of Różany Młyn ("Rose Mill"). North of Umultowo are two small neighbourhoods called Nowa Wieś Górna and Nowa Wieś Dolna ("Upper New Village" and "Lower New Village"), and then Radojewo, which has a palace and park complex and nature reserve. The main road continues northwards from there towards Biedrusko, passing through the adjacent military area.

Further west, north of Piątkowo, is a wide, mainly open area called Morasko (part of Poznań since 1987). The former village of Morasko itself is close to the city's northern boundary, and contains a palace used chiefly as a convent. West of this is a nature reserve around a series of supposed meteorite craters. This reserve also contains Poznań's highest point, the hill known as Góra Moraska, with an altitude of 154 metres (505 ft). The wider area of Morasko also includes the neighbourhood called Huby Moraskie, as well as the complex of buildings of Adam Mickiewicz University located just north-east of Piątkowo, used mainly for natural science teaching.

Stare Miasto contains quite extensive areas of forest, including in the area between Piątkowo and Naramowice, along the river from Naramowice northwards, and in the area of the Morasko reserve.

Poznań's fast tram line, Poznański Szybki Tramwaj (popularly known as Pestka), runs from west of the city centre, initially as an elevated line, and then in a cutting passing through Winogrady and Piątkowo to the terminus and bus station at Osiedle Sobieskiego on the northern edge of Piątkowo. There are also older tram lines serving the southern and eastern parts of Winogrady. The main railway line running east from Poznań passes through Stare Miasto, with a station called Poznań Garbary just south of the Cytadela. There is also a relief line passing through the district further north, used for freight transportation.

== History ==
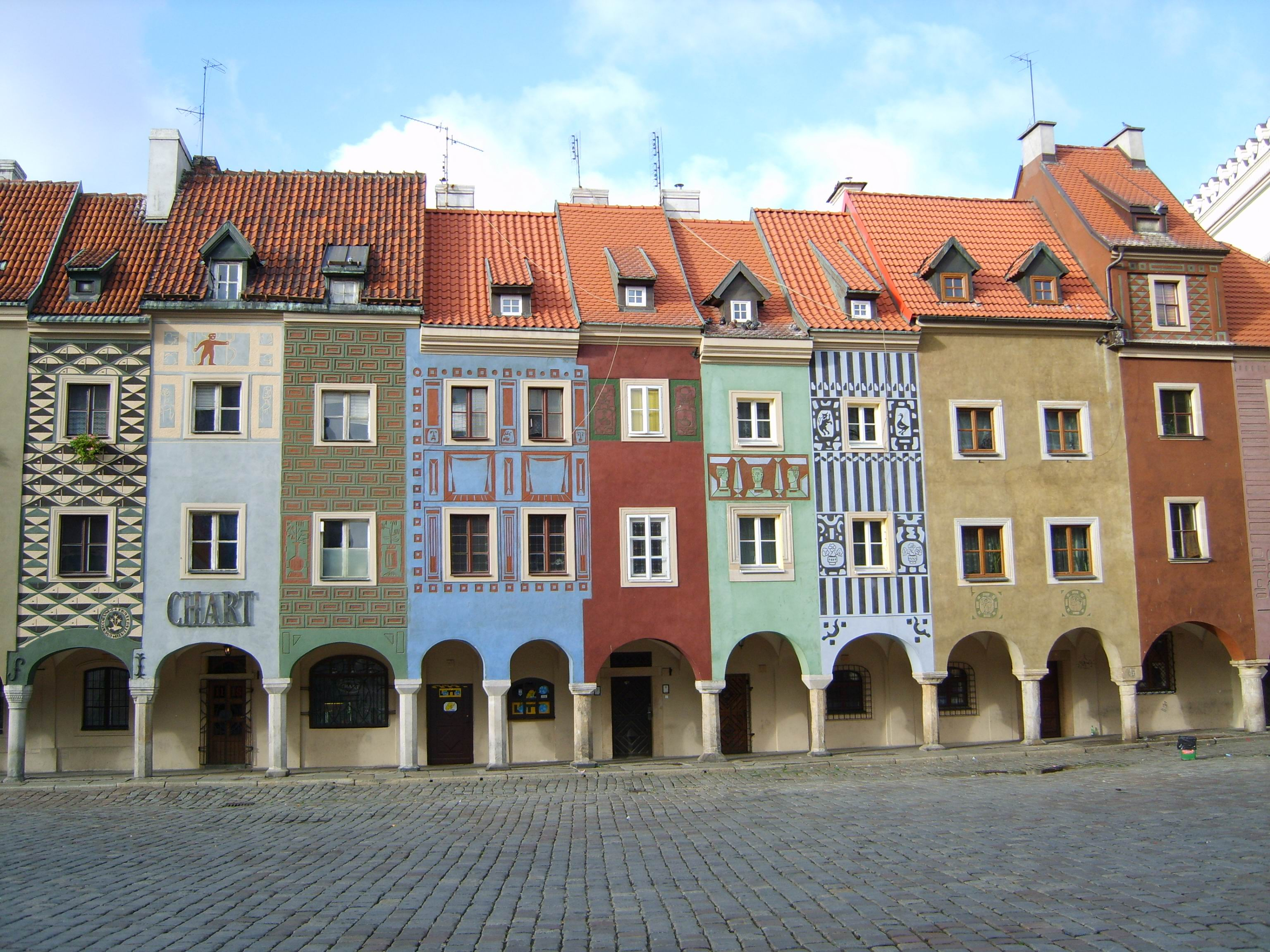
16th-century merchant houses on Poznań's Old Market Square

The Old Town neighbourhood – the medieval walled city – constituted the city of Poznań from its founding in 1253 until 1797, when (under Prussian rule) the city's borders were extended to take in areas to the west – the settlements of St. Martin (Święty Marcin) and St. Adalbert (Święty Wojciech). Chwaliszewo was among the areas added in the eastward expansion of 1800. During the first half of the 19th century the old city walls were taken down and the new western areas of the city (forming most of the modern city centre) were developed.

The fortifications on the Cytadela ("Fort Winiary") were built between 1828 and 1842. This was part of the overall Festung Posen system of fortifications built around the city from the 1830s onwards. The left-bank fortifications all lay within today's Stare Miasto district, following roughly the line of Al. Niepodległości and ul. Krakowska. In the later 19th century an outer ring of forts was built, of which Forts IVa, V and Va now lie within Stare Miasto district.

The next northward expansion of the city's boundaries occurred in 1925, when the Cytadela and the area of Winogrady were incorporated into the city. Naramowice was added under Nazi occupation in the 1940s, and Piątkowo in 1974, leading to the extensive residential development of that neighbourhood (which was already underway in Winogrady). The most northerly parts of Poznań (Morasko, Radojewo, Umultowo, Nowa Wieś Górna, Nowa Wieś Dolna) were brought within the city boundaries in 1987.
