= Paweł Tobolski =

Royal Air Force officer

Paweł "Peter" W. Tobolski (21 March 1906 – not before 2 April 1944) was a Polish airman who fought in World War II, murdered after the "Great Escape" from the Stalag Luft III prisoner of war camp.

He was a navigator with the rank of flying officer in No. 301 Polish Bomber Squadron, an expatriate unit that fought as part of the Royal Air Force against Nazi Germany. He took part in two combat missions. In his second mission, a thousand-bomber raid against Bremen at night of 25/26 June 1942, his bomber Vickers Wellington no. Z1479 GR-A (the squadron commander's) was shot down by anti-aircraft artillery near Dornumergrode; and he was captured and imprisoned in Stalag Luft III.

He was one of 76 men who took part in the "Great Escape" on 25 March 1944; an event memorialised in the 1950 book The Great Escape and in the 1963 film of the same name. On the night of the escape he was dressed as a German soldier and his escape plan was to escort Harry “Wings” Day to Berlin for interrogation. Being dressed as a German soldier required him to get his travel documents stamped by the local German barracks and thus spent a night in the barracks to get the required stamp. If he did not get the stamp he would have been treated as a German deserted soldier. He was eventually caught when his escape partner Harry Day was betrayed by some French workers the two were in contact with.

He was soon recaptured, in Stettin. He was one of the 50 escapees murdered by the Gestapo on the orders of Adolf Hitler. He is buried in Poznan Old Garrison Cemetery in Poland, in a British Commonwealth War Grave, next to others who had escaped with him and who had shared his fate. His name is inscribed on the memorial to "The Fifty" near Żagań, Poland.
