= Piątkowo, Poznań =

Neighbourhood of Poznań, Poland

Coordinates: 52°27′34″N 16°54′20″E

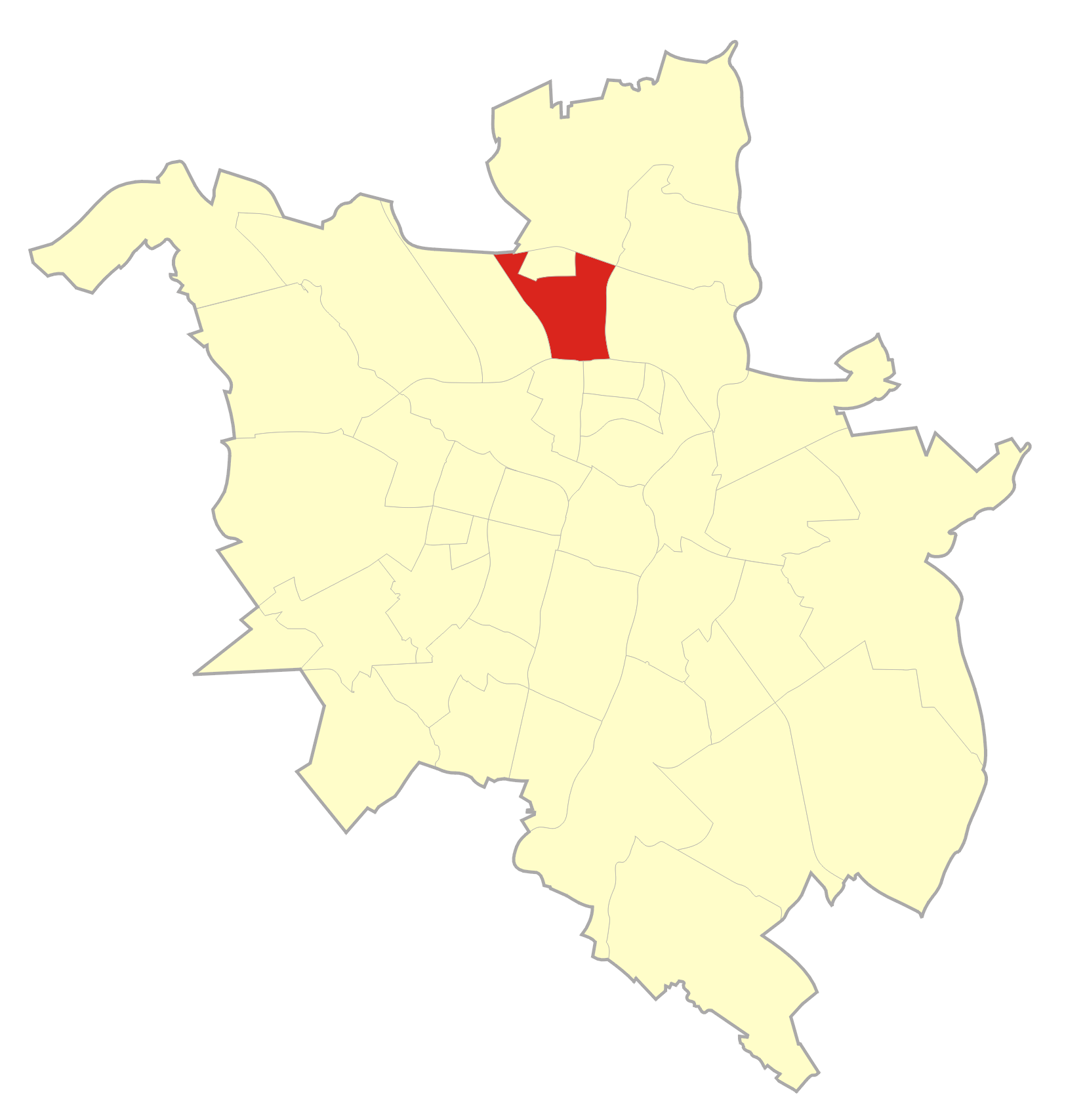
The osiedle of Piątkowo within Poznań

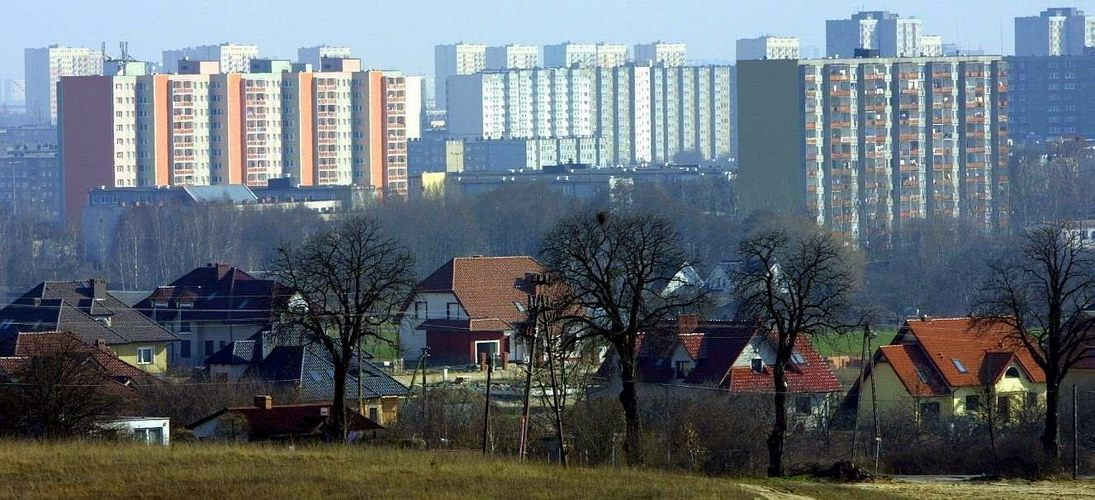
View of Piątkowo from Góra Moraska

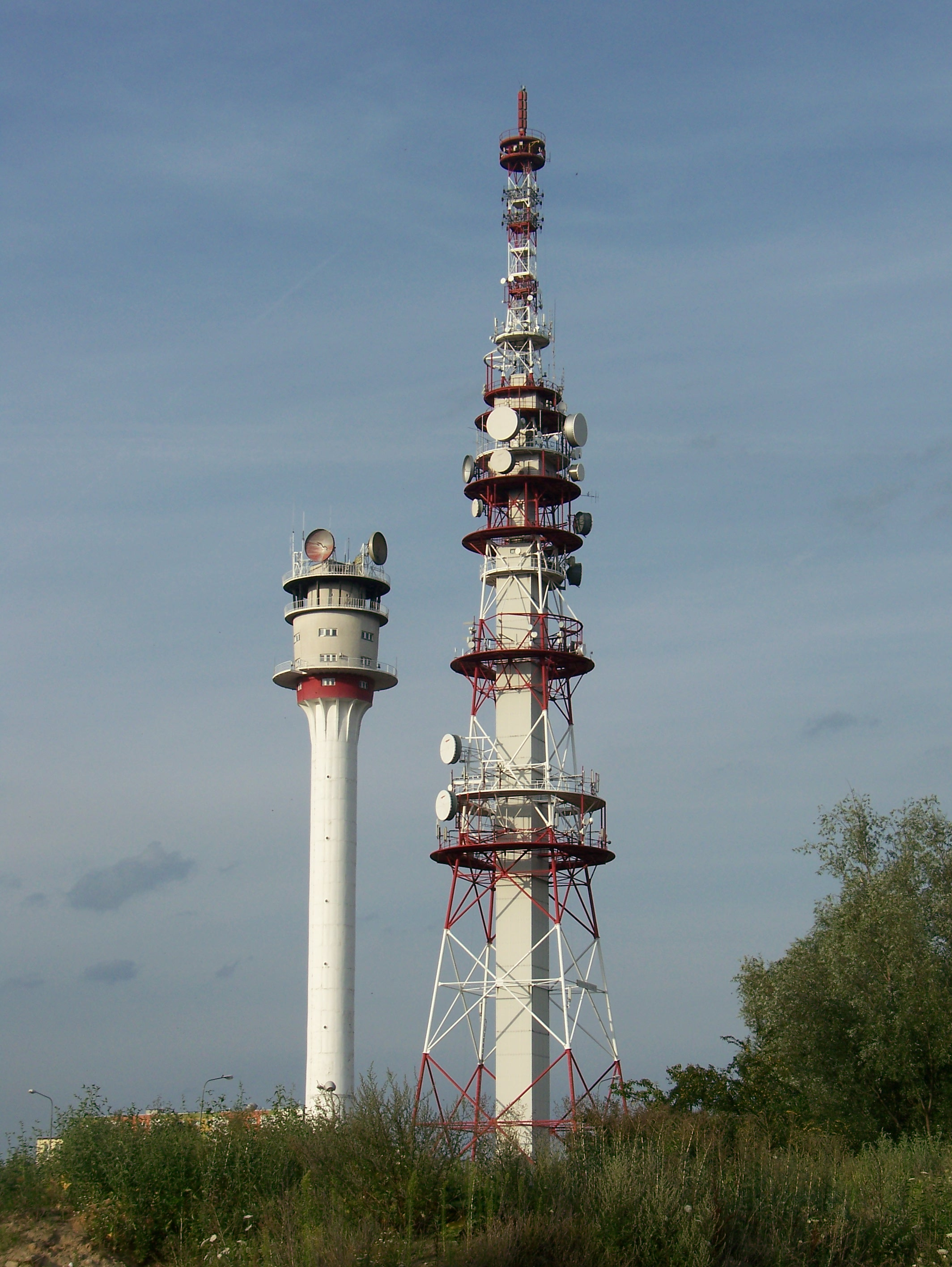
Television tower

Piątkowo [pjɔntˈkɔvɔ] is a part of the city of Poznań in western Poland. It consists mainly of large estates of blocks of flats, built from the late 1970s onwards. Piątkowo is situated in the northern part of the city, north of Winogrady (an area of similar character), and south of the less intensively developed neighbourhood of Morasko.

Piątkowo is the name given to one of the 42 osiedles (city governmental units) into which Poznań is divided, although this does not cover the whole of the area generally referred to as Piątkowo. For more details see Administrative division of Poznań.

== History ==
The first written mention of Piątkowo is found in the founding charter of the city of Poznań (1253), where "Panthcow" is listed among the villages to which the new city was granted rights. In 1283 the village of "Piątków" was granted to a Dominican convent founded in Poznań by Duke Przemysł. It remained the property of the convent until the latter's abolition under Prussian rule in 1822.

In the second half of the 19th century, building by German settlers took place, encouraged by the Prussian Settlement Commission. This occurred mainly around the area of today's ul. Obornicka, the main road leading to Oborniki, which lies to the extreme west of today's Piątkowo district. The German name for the village was Schönherrnhausen. A school was built (today functioning as a school for disabled children, on the corner of ul. Hulewiczów and Obornicka). When the area returned to Poland after the First World War, many of the properties were bought by Poles. In 1934 Piątkowo was made the seat of a gmina (administrative district), which existed until 1954. It was brought within the city boundaries in 1974, and building of the large housing estates – to the east of the old village – began in 1976.

== Piątkowo today ==
Piątkowo today consists mainly of large estates of apartment blocks, mostly built from pre-fabricated concrete panels from 1976 onwards. They house more than 47,000 people, about 8% of the city's population. The estates are named after Polish kings; the largest one is called Osiedle Bolesława Chrobrego (named for Bolesław I the Brave). To the north of this is Osiedle Jana III Sobieskiego (named for John III Sobieski), to the north-east is Osiedle Stefana Batorego (named for Stefan Batory), to the east is Osiedle Bolesława Śmiałego (named for Bolesław II the Bold), and further to the east is Osiedle Władysława Łokietka (named for Władysław I the Elbow-high).

There are also smaller estates to the west and north of Chrobrego called Osiedle Władysława Jagiełły and Osiedle Zygmunta Starego (named for Władysław II Jagiełło and Zygmunt I the Old). West of Osiedle Sobieskiego is Osiedle Marysieńki, an estate of small houses (named for Sobieski's queen Marie Casimire, affectionately known as Marysieńka). Poznań's broadcasting towers (the Piątkowo transmitter, the larger tower built in 1993 with a height of 128 metres) are at the north-west corner of Osiedle Chrobrego.

The boundary between Piątkowo and Winogrady is the street ul. Lechicka, a main east-west transit route through Poznań. The Plaza and Pestka shopping and entertainment complexes are located on the south side of this street. A railway line (a relief line for freight passing through Poznań) runs along Piątkowo's northern edge. An area of woodland, popular for recreation, is situated to the north-east of the estates.

The Poznań Fast Tram Route ("Pestka") connects Piątkowo with Winogrady and the city centre. It terminates at Osiedle Sobieskiego, where there is also a bus station.

== The PSM cooperative ==
Building of the estates was carried out under the auspices of the PSM (Poznańska Spółdzielnia Mieszkaniowa) housing cooperative, which had been founded in 1948, and was also responsible for the similar development of the Winogrady estates. In 1983 the entity was split, a separate cooperative (PSM Winogrady) being created for Winogrady, with PSM itself taking responsibility solely for Piątkowo. The cooperative now has its headquarters on Osiedle Chrobrego, has around 21,000 members, and continues to administer most of the blocks and infrastructure of the Piątkowo estates.
