= Dębienko =

- Village
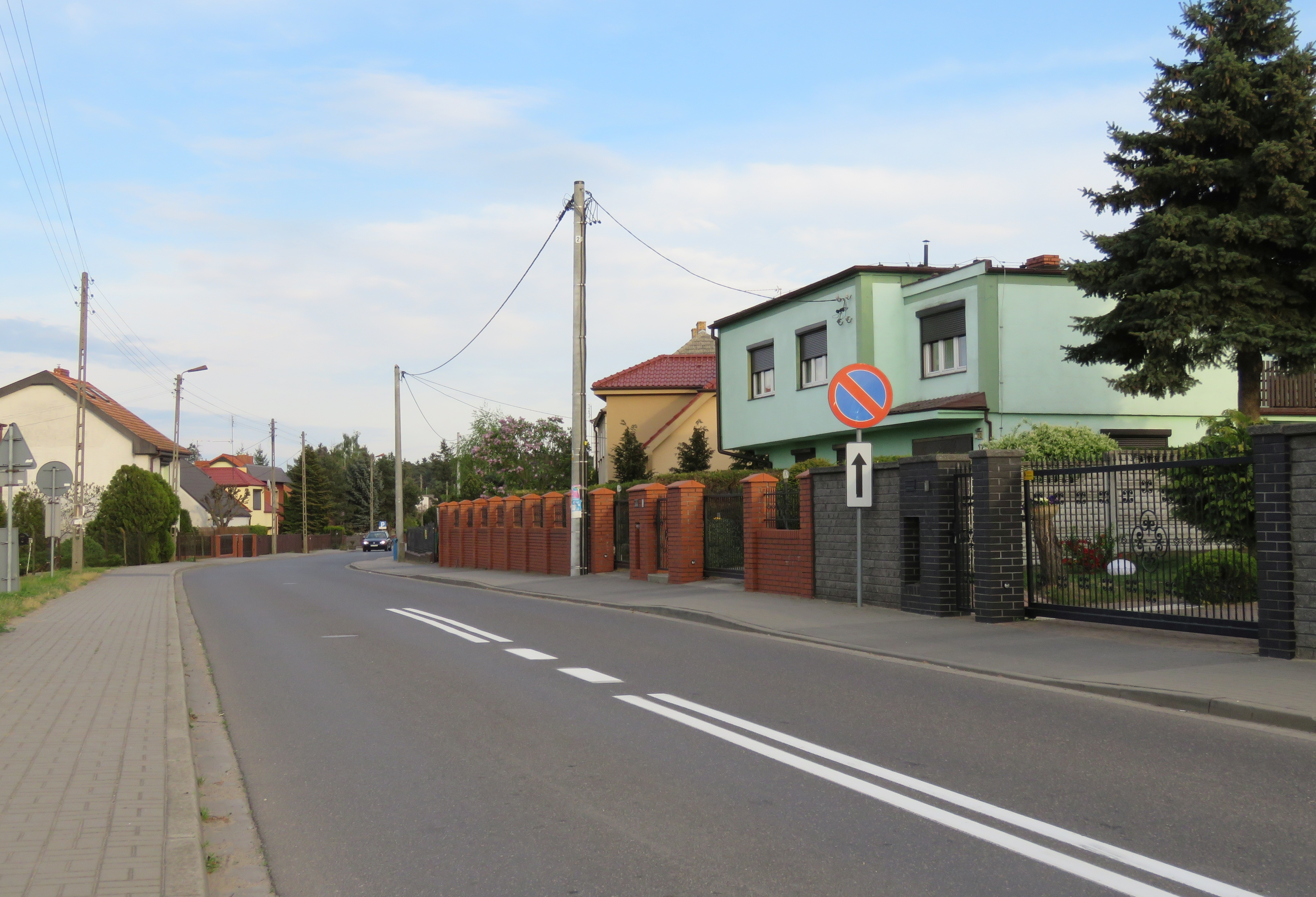

- Location within Poland
- Coordinates: 52°17′21″N 16°43′23″E
- Country: Poland
- Voivodeship: Greater Poland
- County: Poznań
- Gmina: Stęszew
- Population: 480
- Time zone: UTC+1 (CET)
  - Summer (DST): UTC+2 (CEST)
- Vehicle registration: PZ

Dębienko [dɛmˈbjɛnkɔ] is a village in the administrative district of Gmina Stęszew, within Poznań County, Greater Poland Voivodeship, in west-central Poland.

The Wielkopolski National Park is located near Dębienko.

== History ==
During the German occupation of Poland, the local forest was the site of large massacres of Poles from the region committed by the occupiers in 1939–1940 (see Nazi crimes against the Polish nation). On 12–16 November 1939 the German police and SS murdered 60 Poles brought from the Fort VII concentration camp in Poznań in the forest. In January–April 1940 further executions took place, in which over 700 Poles were brought from Fort VII to the forest and murdered. The bodies were buried in several mass graves. In the last months of the war the occupiers burnt the bodies of the victims in an attempt to cover up the crime.

== Transport ==
The Voivodeship road 311 runs through the village, and the Polish S5 highway runs nearby, north-west of the village.
