= Poznań Fast Tram =

Tram system in Poznań, Poland

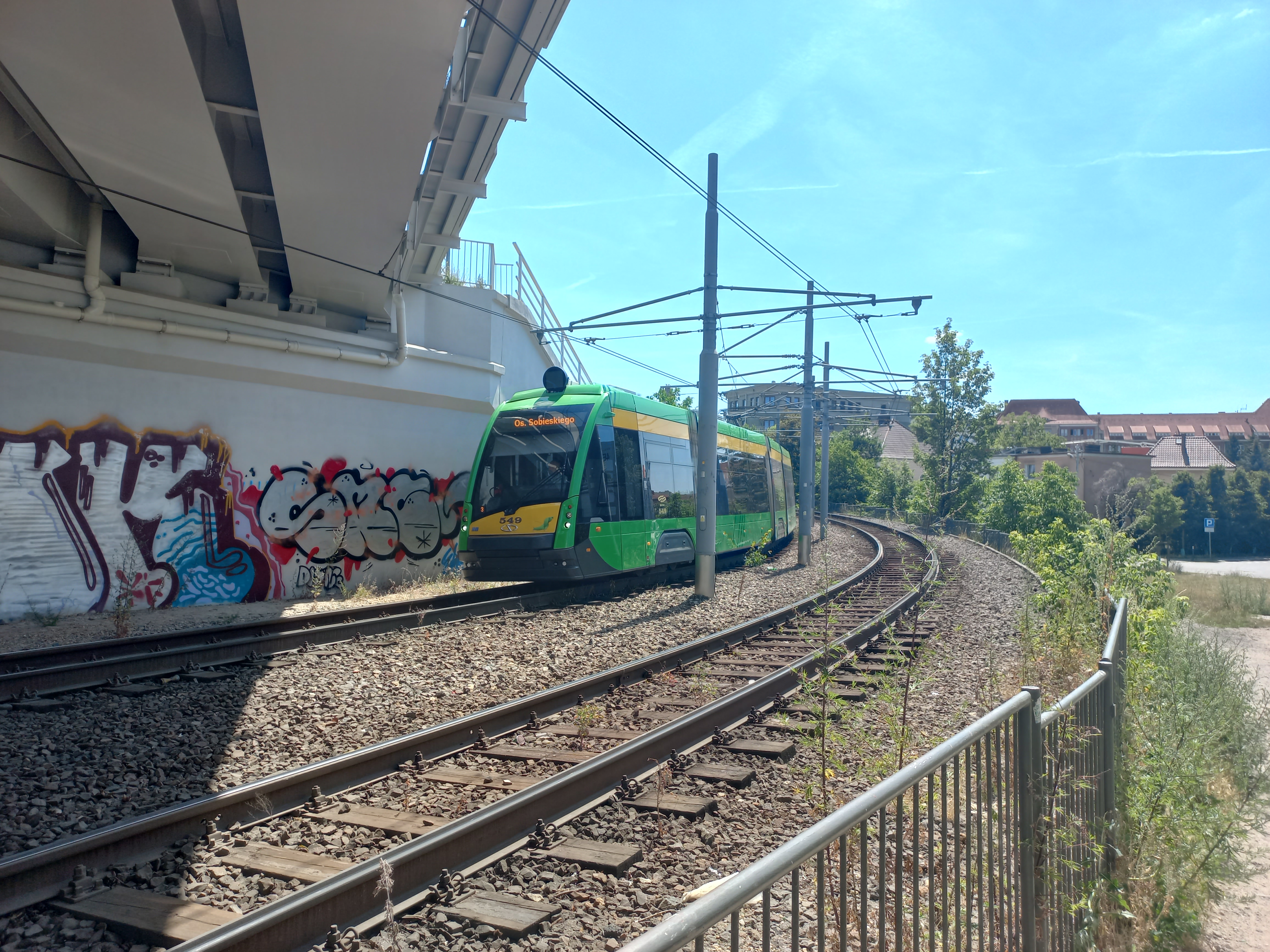
A Solaris Tramino approaching a PST station

Map of Poznań tram network. original PST line extension opened in 2013 other tram lines

Poznań Fast Tram (Polish: Poznański Szybki Tramwaj, PST, informally: PeSTka, pestka – drupe, stone fruit) is a 8.1 km (5.0 mi) stretch of grade-separated tram infrastructure of the tram system in Poznań, Poland. It is served by four day lines (12, 14, 15 and 16) and two night lines (201 and 202). The tracks are set in a cutting or on an overpass, switches allowing to drive on adjacent tracks. The stops, resembling railroad stations, have a different colour scheme each. The PST, of which the first part opened in 1997, links the densely populated northern districts of Winogrady and Piątkowo with the city center.

This tram infrastructure was created as an alternative to a more expensive metro. Initially it was planned to upgrade the infrastructure to rapid transit standards, in a premetro fashion; in the intermediate period it should connect to the regular tram network and use specially built trams.

== System ==
- Length: 8.1 km (5.0 mi)
- Number of stops: 9
- Maximum speed: 70 km/h (43 mph)
- Capacity: 5000 persons per hour
- Trams run every 2.5 minutes during the rush hours, otherwise every 5 minutes

== Background ==
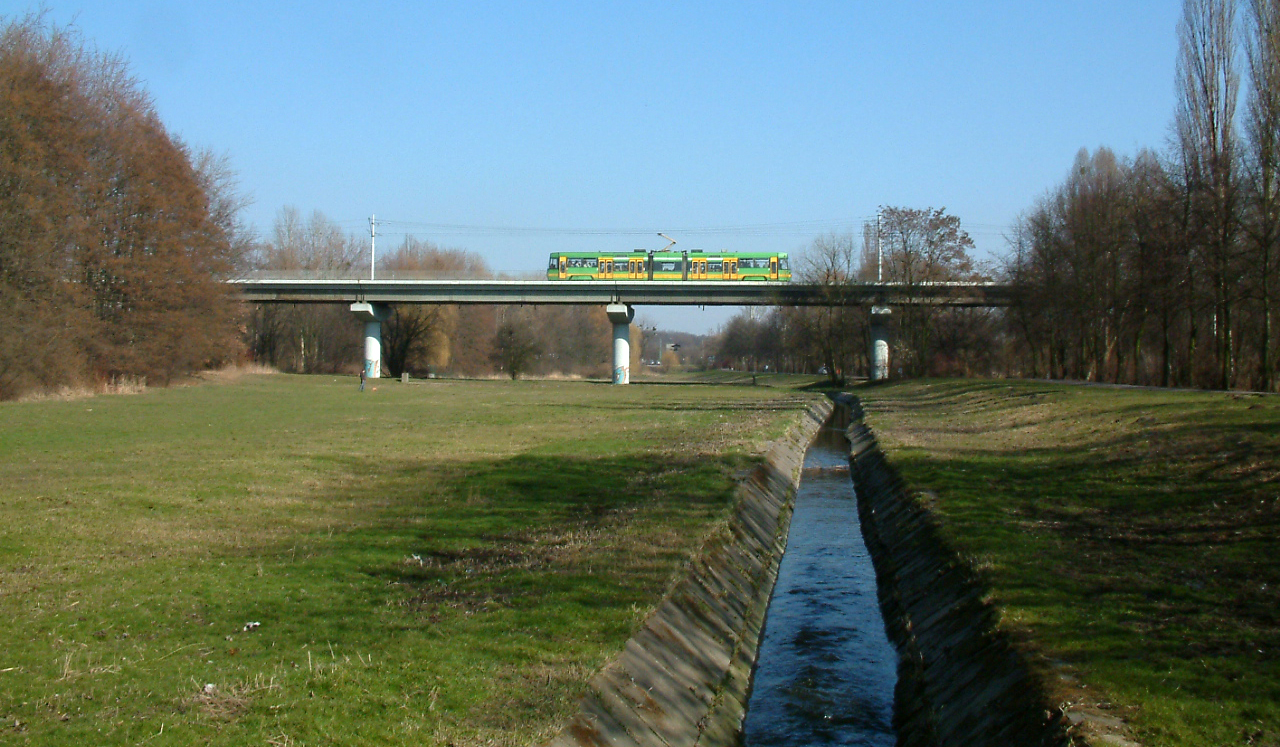
A Tatra RT6N1 on the overpass over the Bogdanka stream

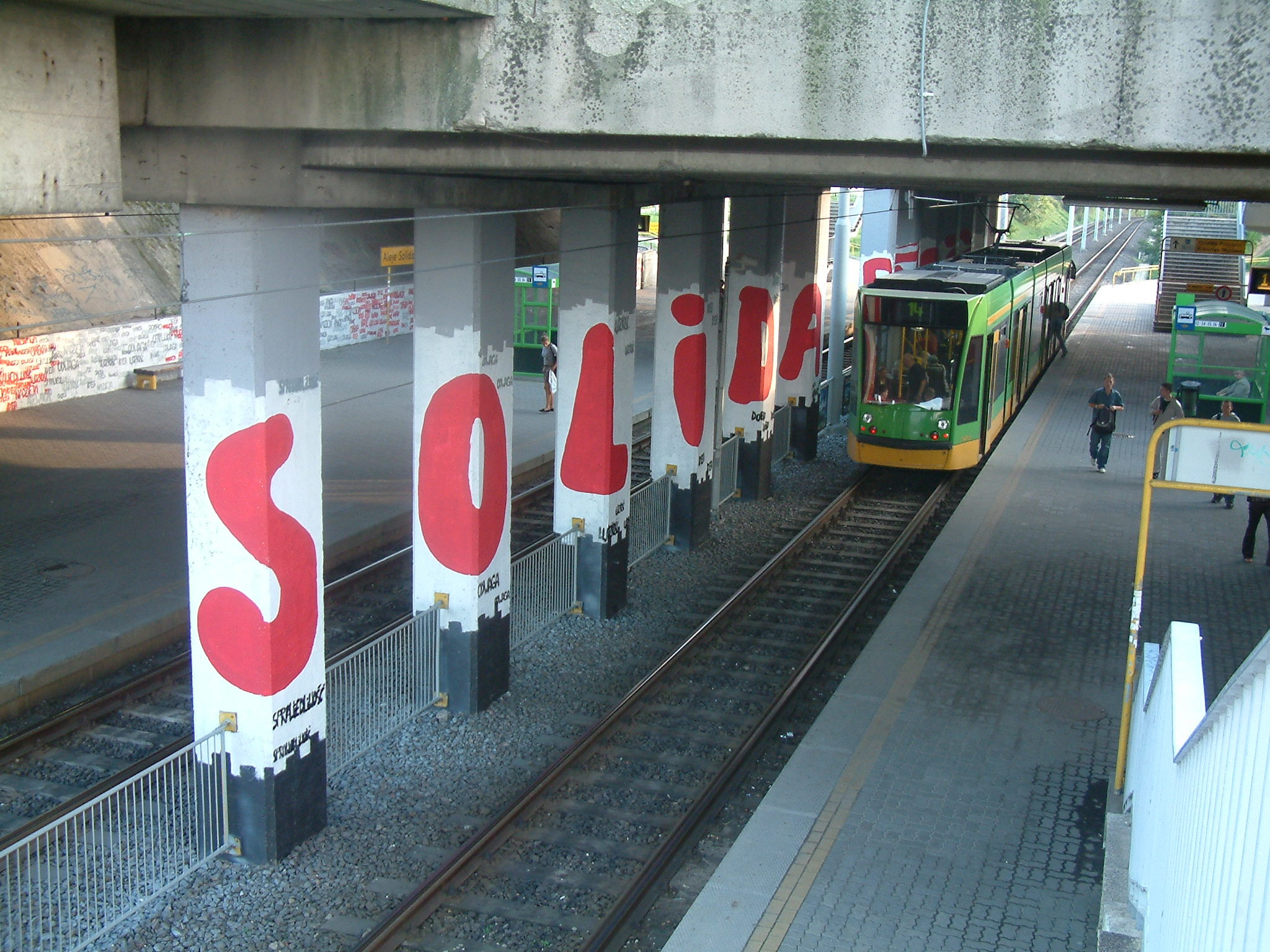
A Siemens Combino at Aleje Solidarności station

Poznań is a city with about half a million inhabitants, with slightly over a million in the entire metropolitan area. Most of the city's office buildings are located in the center, while most light industry is located uptown or in the suburbs around the city. Hence most trips by public transport are to and from the center.

== History ==
The first Poznań public transport company started its business activity in 1880, with a few horse-pulled trams. At that time, the town had about 70,000 inhabitants, and was not growing due to building restrictions imposed by the Prussian military administration creating Festung Posen ("Poznań Stronghold"), see Poznań in the Kingdom of Prussia (1793–1918).

Soon after the company was established, the construction limitations were lifted, and the town grew very fast to about 200,000 inhabitants in 1920s. By that time there were some early ideas of creating a segregated line that would link the center with one of the northern districts. Neither technology nor the budget allowed for a construction of such a tram line, and metro, would have been too ambitious and unnecessary, so the plans were shelved.

In the 1960s and 1970s, Poland's communist government built blocks of flats in the north and east of the city. This created a high population density and thus a high demand for transportation. However, these districts were poorly served by public transport: it took up to 45 minutes by bus to travel to the city center. A corridor was left for the construction of a tram line.

Original plans envisioned a 27 kilometer line completely separate from the existing tram network, conceptually similar to the WKD light rail line in Warsaw. The line was to run from the main railway station in the city center to Winogrady, Piątków, Morasko and the village of Owińska outside the city limits, with several branches. Ultimately however the project was limited to only a 6 kilometer line in the northern part of the city, joining the existing network in the city center.

The construction work commenced in 1975, progressed very slowly, finally stalling at 60% in 1990, after the fall of communism. Construction resumed in 1993, and the entire project was ready by the end of 1996.

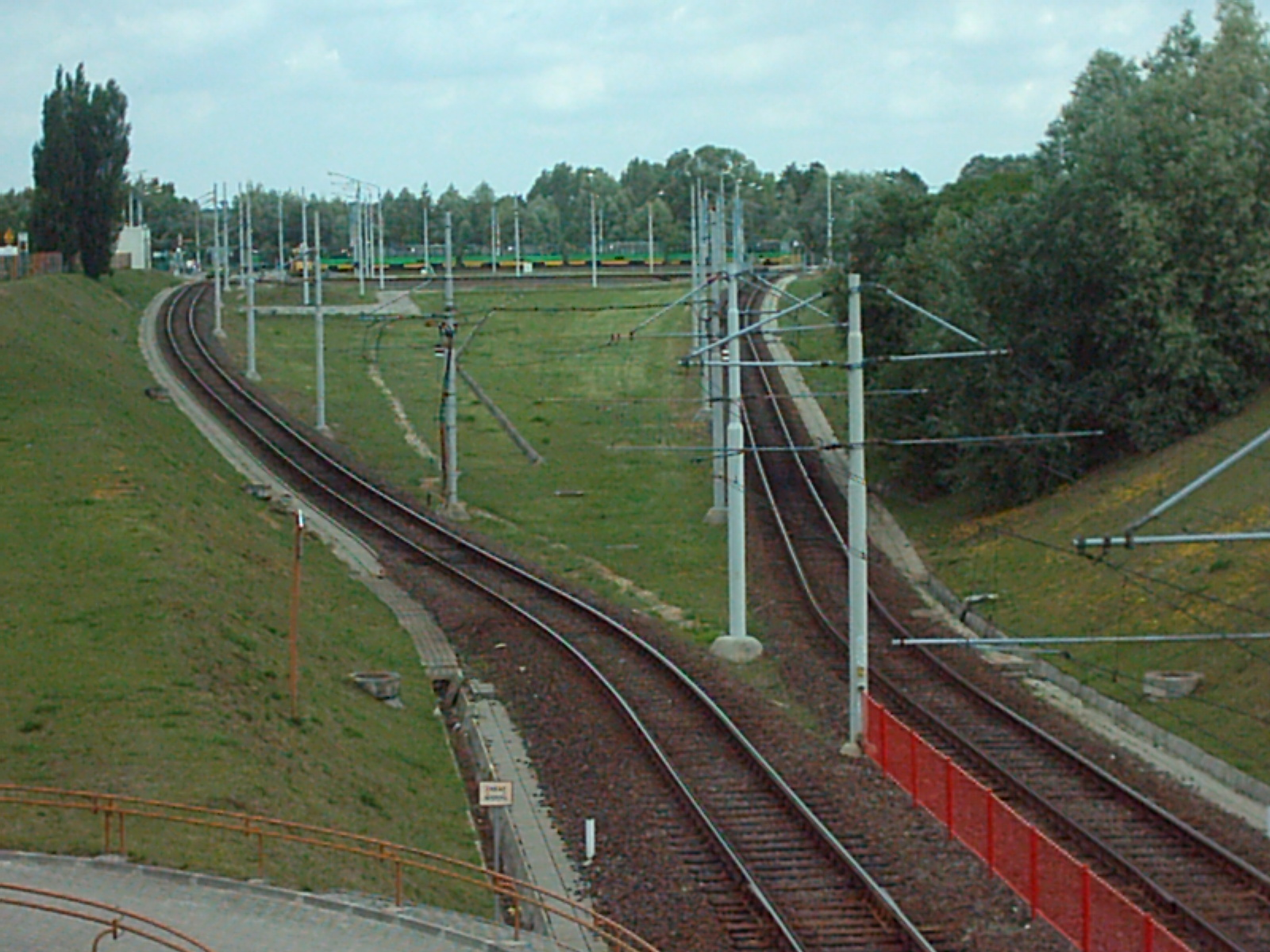
PST northern terminus, Os. Jana III Sobieskiego

The line opened on February 1, 1997. Travel times between the northern districts and the center decreased from about 40 minutes to some 10–15 minutes. This, combined with limited and paid parking space in the center, contributed to the huge success of the line, with overcrowding at peak times.

The tracks originally served three routes, in 1999, a fourth one was added, reaching the limits of the lines capacity with trams run every 2.5 minutes at peak times. As the line has not been fitted with a train protection system, smaller intervals are not allowed for safety reasons.

The trams suffered from vandalism and from a lack of security. These problems, however, diminished when surveillance cameras were installed. The project has had a very positive impact on the communities it serves, making them more attractive for investors, and stopping depopulation.

Some institutions and companies served by the tram, listed by station, include: (those marked by a plus (+) have moved in the general area after the opening of the line):

- Słowiańska (green) — student dormitories, Courts of Law (+)
- Al. Solidarności (previously Serbska; yellow) — 3 supermarkets (+), a large office building (+)
- Lechicka/Poznań Plaza (previously Lechicka; blue) — a supermarket (+), Poznań Plaza shopping mall (+)
- Kurpińskiego (orange) — a bank (+), a small supermarket, a clinic
- Szymanowskiego (red) — a supermarket (+), and a large development of modern apartment blocks
- Osiedle Jana III Sobieskiego (terminus) — Adam Mickiewicz University campus

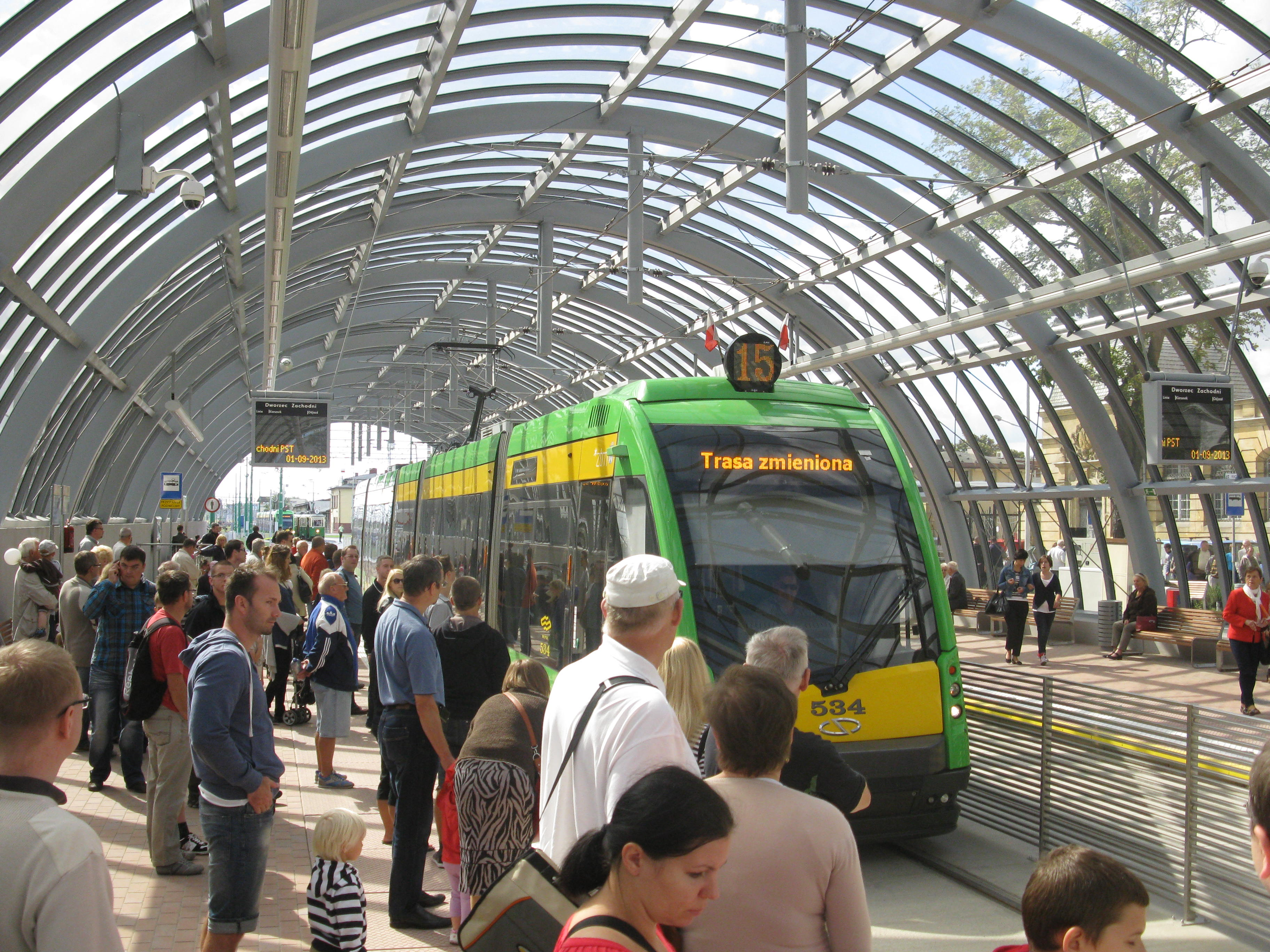
Dworzec zachodni station

In 2011 work began on a previously cut 2 kilometer long extension of the line to the Poznań Główny railway station in the city center, sandwiched between the preexisting tram line running in the city streets and railway tracks. The extension was opened in 2013 with its own turning loop, which allows for operating longer trams sets that could partially alleviate congestion.

In 2022, renovations to the PST route began. The main intent was to restore speeds of 70 km/h and reduce noise. On December 24, 2023, the section of the route up to Słowiańska was opened, and on May 13, the route to Os. Sobieskiego was opened.

=== Current lines ===
#	Stops
Regular line
12	OS. JANA III SOBIESKIEGO – PST – Dworzec Zachodni – Głogowska – Most Dworcowy – Matyi – Królowej Jadwigi – Krzywoustego – rondo Rataje – Ludwika Zamenhofa – rondo Starołęka – Starołęcka – STAROŁĘKA PKM
14	OS. JANA III SOBIESKIEGO – PST – Dworzec Zachodni – Głogowska – GÓRCZYN PKM
15	OS. JANA III SOBIESKIEGO – PST – Słowiańska – Roosevelta – Grunwaldzka – rondo Nowaka-Jeziorańskiego – Grunwaldzka – JUNIKOWO
16	OS. JANA III SOBIESKIEGO – PST – Słowiańska – Roosevelta – Most Teatralny – Fredry – Gwarna – Św. Marcin – Al. Marcinkowskiego – Podgórna – Dowbora-Muśnickiego – Mostowa – Kórnicka – Trasa Kórnicka – Piaśnicka – FRANOWO
Night line
201	OS. JANA III SOBIESKIEGO – PST – Dworzec Zachodni – Głogowska - Roosvelta - Rondo Kaponiera – Św. Marcin – Al. Marcinkowskiego – Podgórna – Dowbora-Muśnickiego – Mostowa – Most Św. Rocha – Kórnicka – Trasa Kórnicka – Chartowo - Żegrze - UNII LUBELSKIEJ Line does not run on the night from Monday to Tuesday
202	OS. JANA III SOBIESKIEGO – PST – Most Teatralny – Fredry - Gwarna – Św. Marcin – Al. Marcinkowskiego – Podgórna – Dowbora-Muśnickiego – Mostowa – Most Św. Rocha – Kórnicka – Trasa Kórnicka – Piaśnicka – FRANOWO Line run only on weekends

== Future development ==
Similar fast tram networks exist in other parts of the world — namely in Vienna, Amsterdam, and Brussels — while several other cities, beginning with Karlsruhe, have used mainline railway tracks to expand their tram networks. However, those cities are much larger and have gone further towards the development of trams into metro-style, heavier vehicles. It was therefore important for the Poznań administration to find out on their own how successful the program would be.

As the program had proved successful, another new tram line started in early 2005, connecting the city center with eastern district of Rataje. It is not truly a fast tram, but the success of the first program has prompted the authority to convert an existing line into a faster one.

== See also ==
- Trams in Poznań
- List of town tramway systems in Poland
