= Morasko =

Neighbourhood in north of Poznań, Poland

Coordinates: 52°28′58″N 16°53′59″E

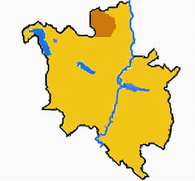
Morasko (brown) within Poznań.

Morasko [mɔˈraskɔ] is a part of the Stare Miasto district of Poznań, in western Poland. It covers a fairly large but little-urbanised area in the north of the city. To the west and north it borders on the village and municipality of Suchy Las, a developing area of suburban housing. To the east of Morasko are the neighbourhoods of Umultowo and Radojewo, and to the south is the densely built residential area of Piątkowo.

For governmental purposes, Morasko is part of the osiedle of Morasko-Radojewo.

== History ==
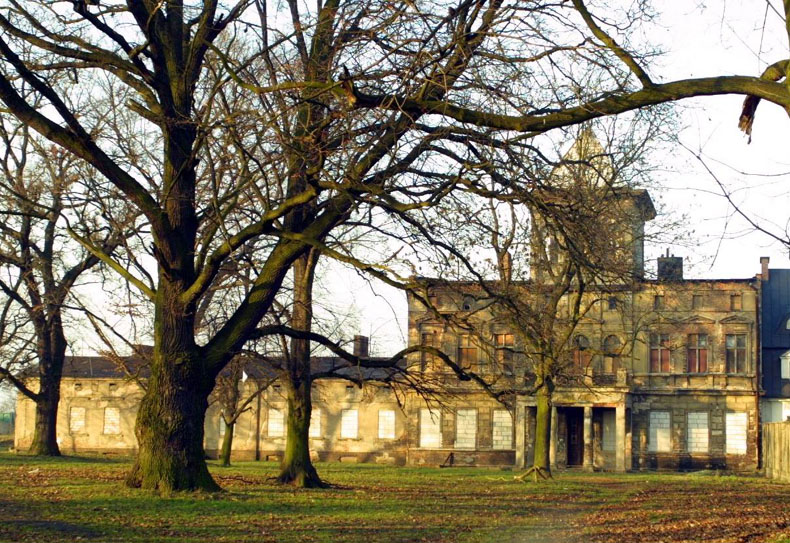
Disused part of the mansion.

Morasko is first mentioned in 1388, as belonging to the parish of Chojnica, although there was probably a settlement there as early as the 11th century. A wooden church was built in the village (then known as Morawsko) in 1403, and it functioned as a separate parish for a time, but in 1507 it was reincorporated into Chojnica parish.

A mansion was built in Morasko in 1783–1786, in late Baroque style. Between 1857 and 1887 (with the region now under Prussian rule) this was extended, in eclectic style, and a park was laid out around it. At the beginning of the 20th century Morasko was given the German name Nordheim. A Protestant church was built there in 1907, and in 1930–1931 (with the region again part of Poland) a Catholic church was built.

In 1945 the village of Chojnica ceased to exist, being part of the Biedrusko military area, and Morasko became the Catholic parish seat (the parish also including Radojewo to the east). The former Protestant church became the parish church, the Church of the Beheading of St. John the Baptist. The former Catholic church is disused and in disrepair. The west part of the mansion is also in disrepair, while the east part is used as a convent by the Missionary Sisters of Christ the King (Siostry Misjonarki Chrystusa Króla).

== Geography ==
The village of Morasko and surrounding areas (particularly those of Huby Moraskie to the south) were incorporated into the city of Poznań in 1987. The village now lies near the city's northern boundary. In the south-east of the wider Morasko area is a complex of buildings belonging to Adam Mickiewicz University, used mainly for natural science teaching.

West of Morasko village is the Morasko meteorite nature reserve, a forest area containing a group of depressions believed to be meteorite craters. Also within this reserve is Góra Moraska (Morasko Hill), whose summit is Poznań's highest point, with an altitude of 157 metres (515 ft). An avenue of trees along the road leading from the village to the reserve is designated as a natural monument.

A stream called Strumień Różany or Różany Potok ("Rose Stream") flows eastwards, south of Huby Moraskie, in the direction of the Warta river. It gives its name to the large housing estate Osiedle Różany Potok, which lies to the east of the university complex.

== Gallery ==
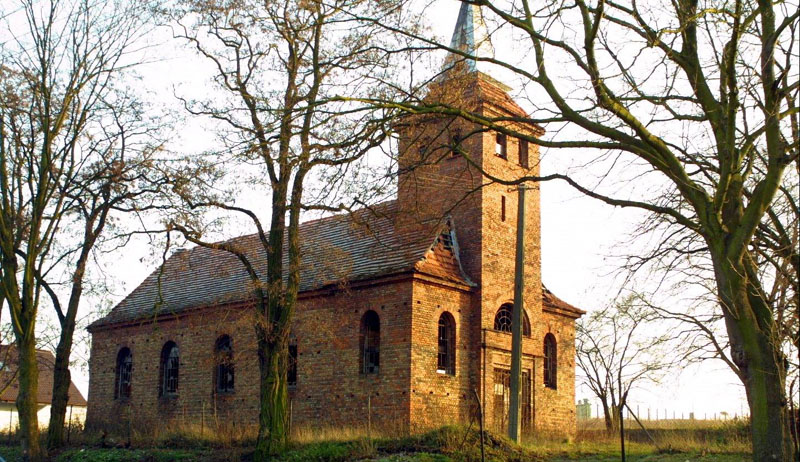
Disused Catholic church.

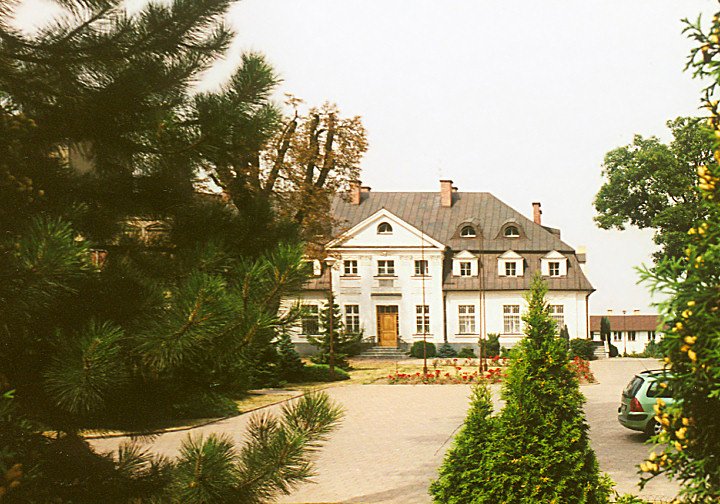
Convent within the old mansion.

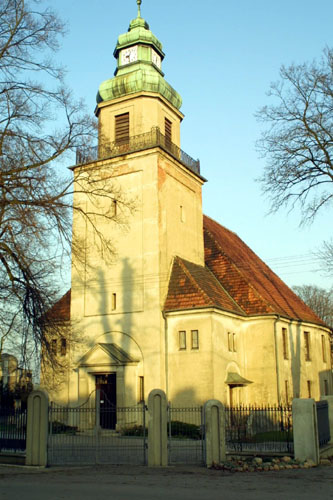
Former Protestant church, now the Catholic parish church.
