= Piątkowo transmitter =

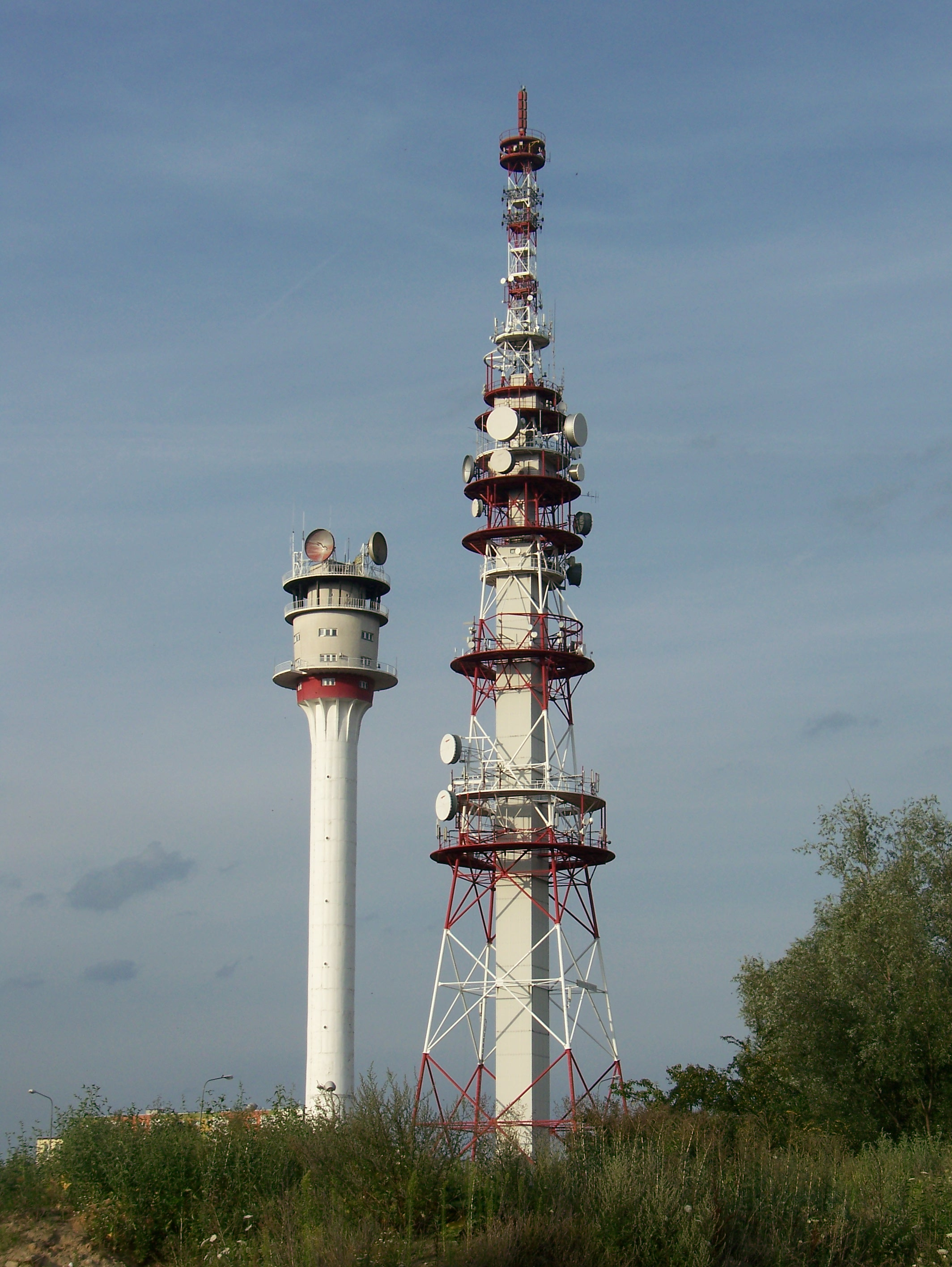
The two towers

The Piątkowo transmitter (Polish designation: SLR Piątkowo) is a facility for directional radio and broadcasting of local FM and TV programmes at Piątkowo, a northern residential district of the Polish city of Poznań. The Piątkowo transmitter, which is situated at 52°27′35″N 16°54′27″E and property of the Polish company Emitel, consists of two towers of different height and construction type.

The smaller tower is a 76-metre-tall (249 ft) free-standing concrete tower, which was built in 1963. Unlike most concrete telecommunication towers, it has no antenna mast on its top. The higher tower of Piątkowo transmitter is a 128 metre tall free-standing lattice tower, which was built in 1993. This tower is the second tallest structure in Poznań (a chimney of a power station in the urban part Karolin is taller) and belongs to the tallest free-standing radio towers in Poland.

== Programmes transmitted ==
Radio
| Program | Frequency | Transmission Power |
|---|---|---|
| PR1 Polskie Radio S.A. | 89,10 MHz | 0,10 kW |
| EMAUS Archidiecezja Poznańska | 89,80 MHz | 1 kW |
| RMI FM Media Sp. z o.o. | 90,60 MHz | 0,10 kW |
| TOK FM - Pierwsze Radio Informacyjne INFORADIO Sp. z o.o. | 97,70 MHz | 0,10 kW |
| PR4 Polskie Radio S.A. | 100,20 MHz | 0,10 kW |
| Radiostacja "Radiostacja" Sp. z o.o. | 101,60 MHz | 1 kW |
| Radio ZET Radio ZET Sp. z o.o. | 104,70 MHz | 0,10 kW |
| Radio Merkury Polskie Radio - Regionalna Rozgłośnia w Poznaniu "Radio Merkury" S.A. | 102,70 MHz | 0,40 kW |

TV
| Program | Frequency | Channel | Transmitter power |

== See also ==
- List of towers
