= Winogrady =

Part of the Stare Miasto district of the city of Poznań in western Poland

Coordinates: 52°26′08″N 16°56′04″E

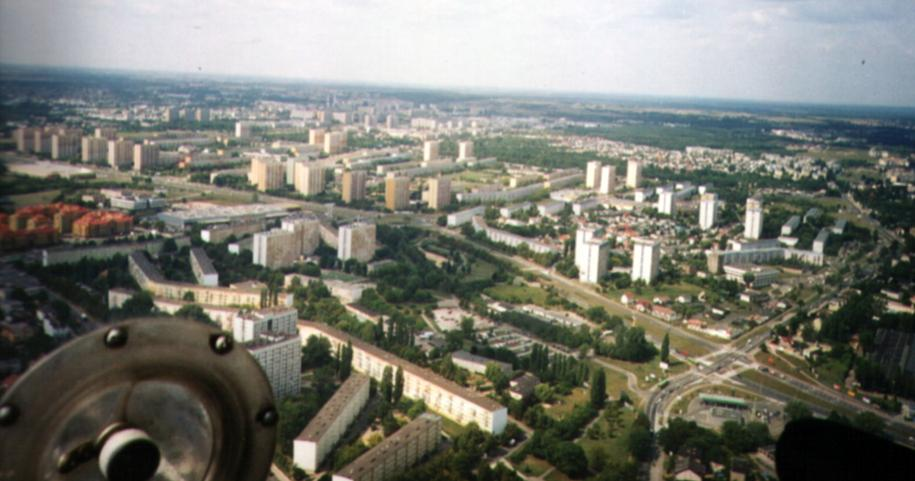
Aerial view of Winogrady

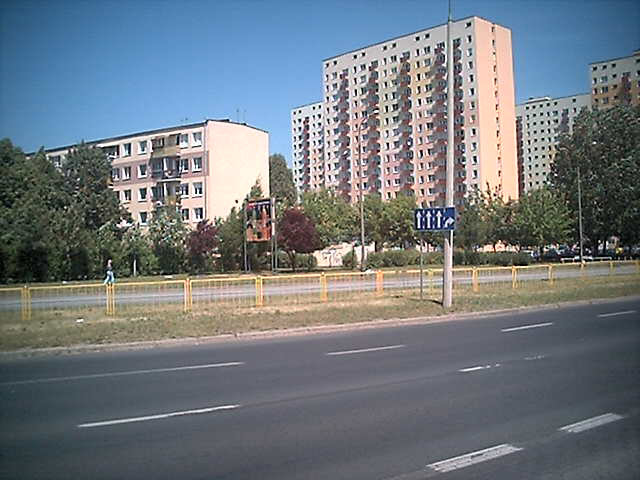
Osiedle Wichrowe Wzgórze seen from Aleje Solidarności

Winogrady [vinɔˈɡradɨ] is a part of the Stare Miasto district of the city of Poznań in western Poland. It is situated north of the Cytadela park (the former Poznań citadel). The name refers to the vineyards which formerly existed in the area – historically there were two villages there called Winiary (although "Winiary" today refers to a neighbourhood in Jeżyce district, to which the inhabitants were moved when the citadel fortifications were built in the 1830s).

The southern part of Winogrady, between the streets ul. Winogrady and ul. Słowiańska, consists mainly of houses, although there are also some apartment blocks (including the "Batman" development, named for its black colour) and student halls of residence. North of this is an area which consists of large estates of apartment blocks, mostly built from pre-fabricated concrete panels from 1968 onwards. Most of these blocks and the estate infrastructure belong to the PSM Winogrady (Poznańska Spółdzielnia Mieszkaniowa Winogrady) housing cooperative, founded as a separate entity in 1984 (the development having previously been carried out by the PSM cooperative which now administers only the Piątkowo estates). The Winogrady estates house approximately 43,000 people, about 7–8% of the city's population.

The estates (osiedla) are called Osiedle Pod Lipami ("Under the Lime Trees"), Osiedle Przyjaźni ("Friendship"), Osiedle Kosmonautów ("Cosmonauts'"), Osiedle Wichrowe Wzgórze ("Wuthering Heights") and Osiedle Zwycięstwa ("Victory"). There is also a newer estate (Osiedle Na Murawie) to the east of the district. Wichrowe Wzgórze was originally called Osiedle Kraju Rad ("Estate of the Land of Councils", referring to the Soviet Union), and Pod Lipami was called Osiedle Wielkiego Października ("Estate of Great October", referring to the October Revolution); these were renamed after the fall of the communist regime.

For city governmental purposes, the area is divided into four parts, which also called osiedla: Stare Winogrady ("Old Winogrady"), Nowe Winogrady Północ ("New Winogrady North"), Nowe Winogrady Wschód ("New Winogrady East"), and Nowe Winogrady Południe ("New Winogrady South"). See Administrative division of Poznań.

The main street Aleje Solidarności ("Solidarity Avenue"), formerly ul. Serbska ("Serb Street"), runs between Przyjaźni and Pod Lipami to the south, and Zwycięstwa, Wichrowe Wzgórze and Kosmonautów to the north. North of the latter estates is ul. Lechicka, a main transit route through Poznań, north of which are a number of similar estates in the neighbourhood of Piątkowo. The Plaza and Pestka shopping and entertainment complexes are located on the south side of this street, in the north of Winogrady.

The Poznań Fast Tram Route ("Pestka") runs west of the Winogrady estates, continuing northwards to Piątkowo and southwards to the city centre. There are also older tram lines which run from the centre eastwards along ul. Winogrady and then northwards, serving the eastern parts of the district.
