= Fort Winiary =

Prussian fortifications around Poznań, Poland

Coordinates: 52.4211°N 16.9353°E

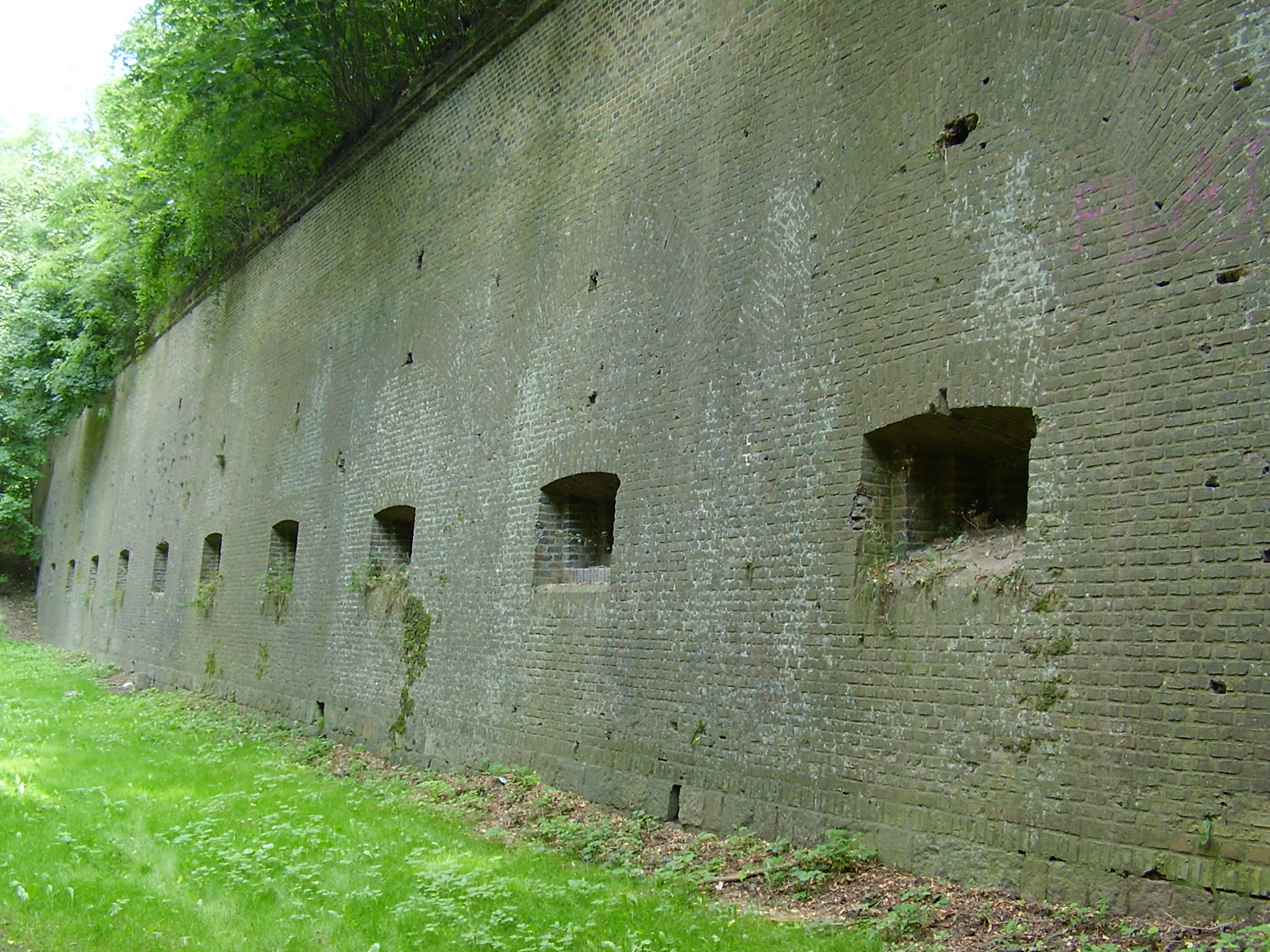
Part of the remaining fortifications: Ravelin I

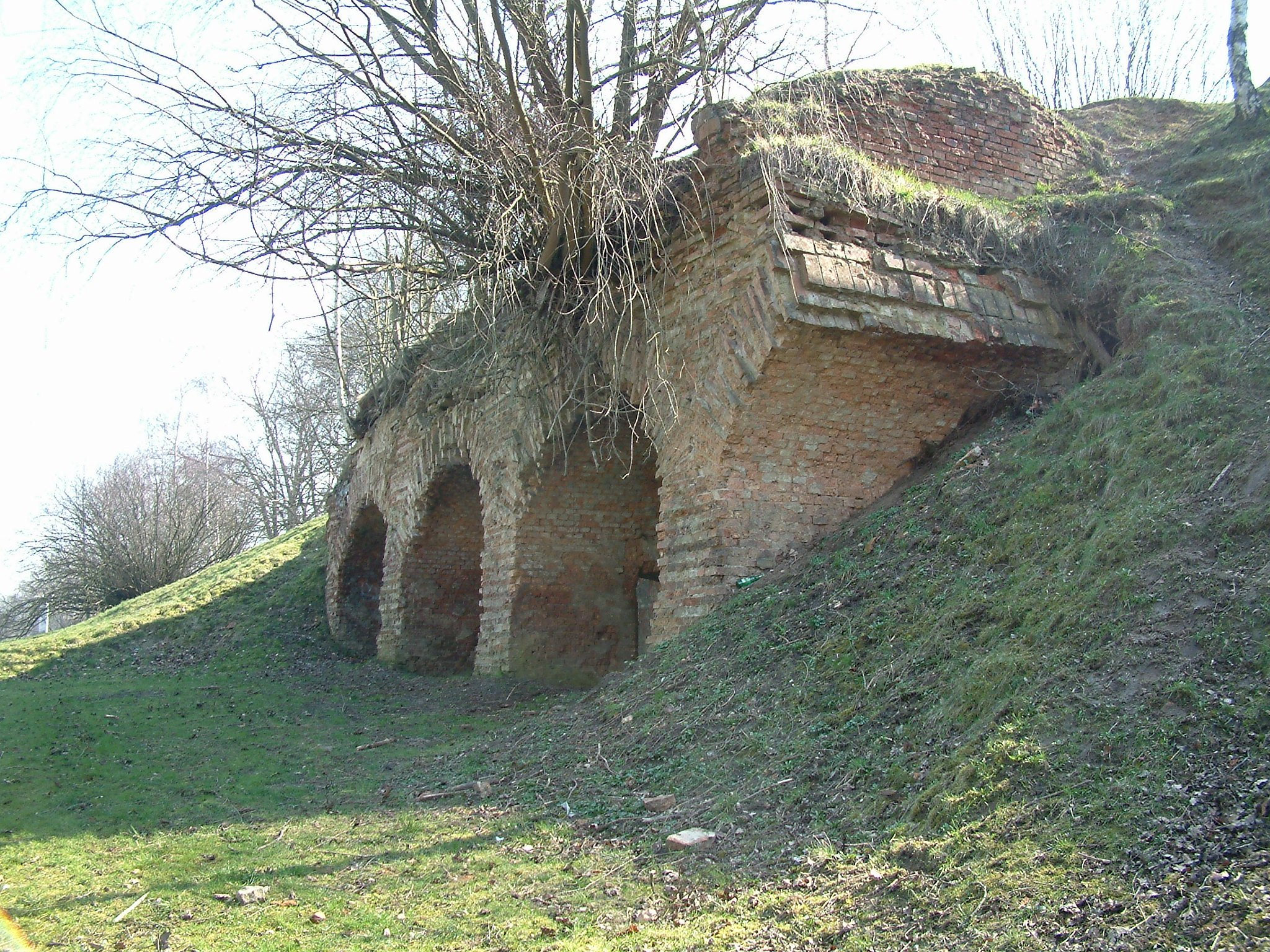
Bastion I

Fort Winiary was part of Festung Posen ("Fortress Poznań"), a system of defensive fortifications around the Polish city of Poznań.

== Origins ==
Fort Winiary was first constructed under Prussian rule in the 19th century. It was the main fort in that system, and was among the first elements to be constructed. Detailed plans were approved on 21 February 1829, and the name "Fort Winiary" soon came to be applied, as the fort was situated on a hill where there were two villages called Winiary (the name alluding to the vine cultivation which had once taken place there). The fort would later become popularly known as Poznań's citadel (cytadela).

On 10 October 1829 an order was made restricting civilian building in a strip in front of the planned fort. In May and June 1830, the villages of Winiary and the nearby Bonin farm were evacuated, the inhabitants being moved to an area to the north-west (Neu Winiary). This is the neighbourhood known as Winiary today, part of the city's Jeżyce district (there is also an estate there named Bonin).

The fort had a main reduit (Kernwerk) on the southern (city) side, flanked by four redoubts (Redoute I and Redoute II to the west; Redoute IV and Redoute III to the east). At the eastern and western extremes were Ravelin I and Ravelin IV. The northern side of the fort consisted of (from west to east) Bastion I, Ravelin II, Bastion II, Ravelin III and Bastion III. The first and third redoubt were the first to be completed, in 1830, and the main réduit was finished in 1832. In 1834 three infantry battalions were garrisoned there. The third and fourth ravelins were finished in 1838 and 1839, completing the fort.

On 15 October 1856 the bastions were renamed Bastion Johann, Bastion Leopold and Bastion Ludwig, these being the forenames of the chief architect of Festung Posen and of the fort itself, Johann Leopold Ludwig Brese (later von Brese–Winiary).

Between 1865 and 1873 work was done to reinforce the fort's powder stores (Kriegs-Pulver-Magazin No. 1 and No. 2). In the early 1890s an artillery laboratory (Spezial-Kriegs-Laboratorium) was built within the fort.

== 20th century ==
In 1903 a telegraph station was added. The fort was further reinforced in 1910.

Unlike the bulk of the city's inner fortifications, Fort Winiary was not demolished during the early twentieth century. It served as the German army's last point of resistance in the Battle of Poznań (1945), and was finally taken by the Red Army on 23 February 1945. The main redoubt was seriously damaged in the fighting.

After the war, the fort was the site of public executions by hanging. The very last of these was that of the German SS functionary Arthur Greiser.

In the period 1963-1970 the Fort was developed into the city's Park Cytadela. Most of the fortifications were demolished, although some structures were preserved. The site is listed as one of Poland's official national Historic Monuments (Pomnik historii), as designated November 28, 2008, along with other portions of the city's historic core. Its listing is maintained by the National Heritage Board of Poland.
