= Poznań Fortress =

Prussian fortifications in Poznań, Poland

Coordinates: 52.4219°N 16.9352°E

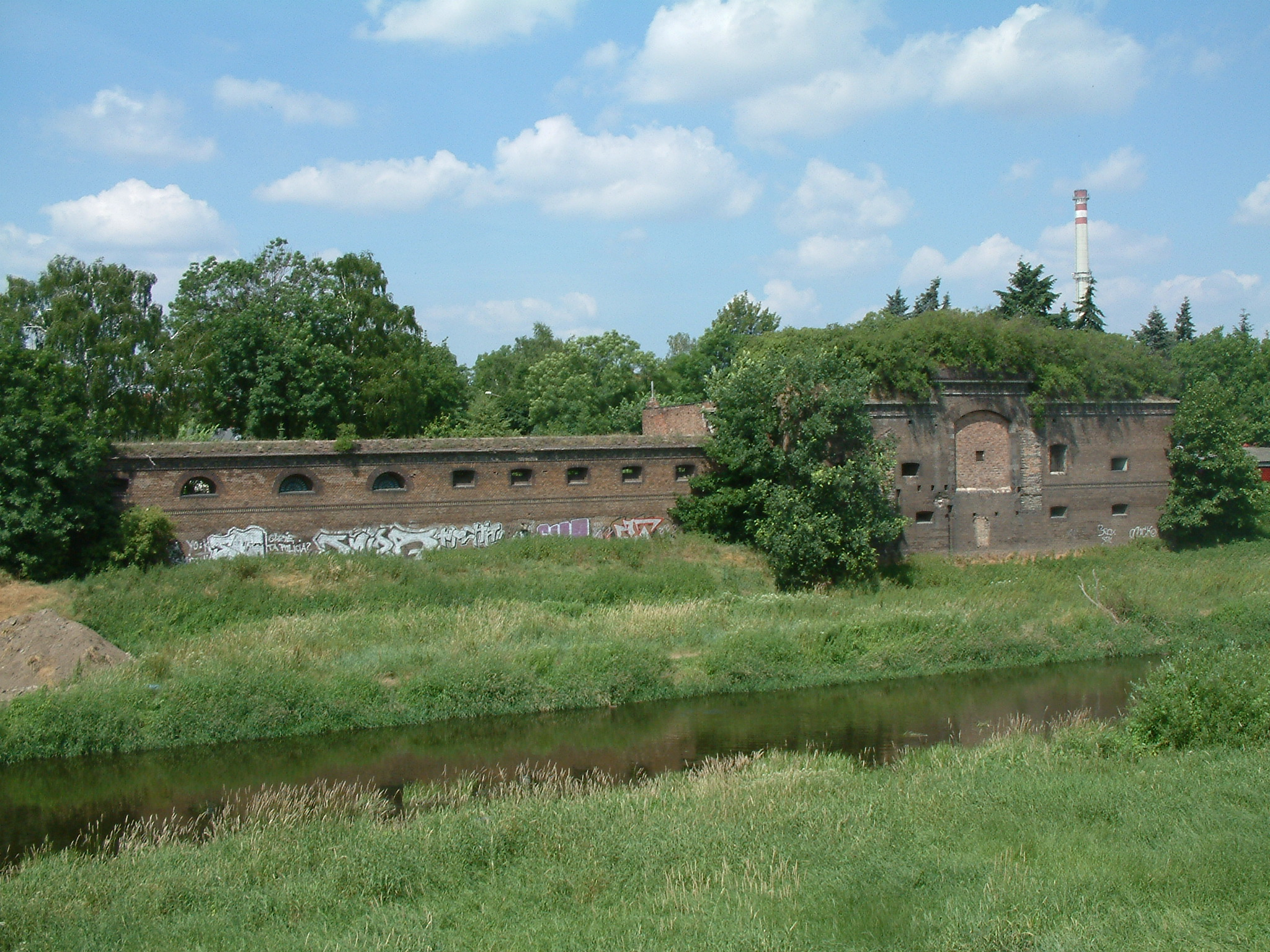
Remains of the Cathedral Lock (Dom Schleuse), part of the original inner ring of defences

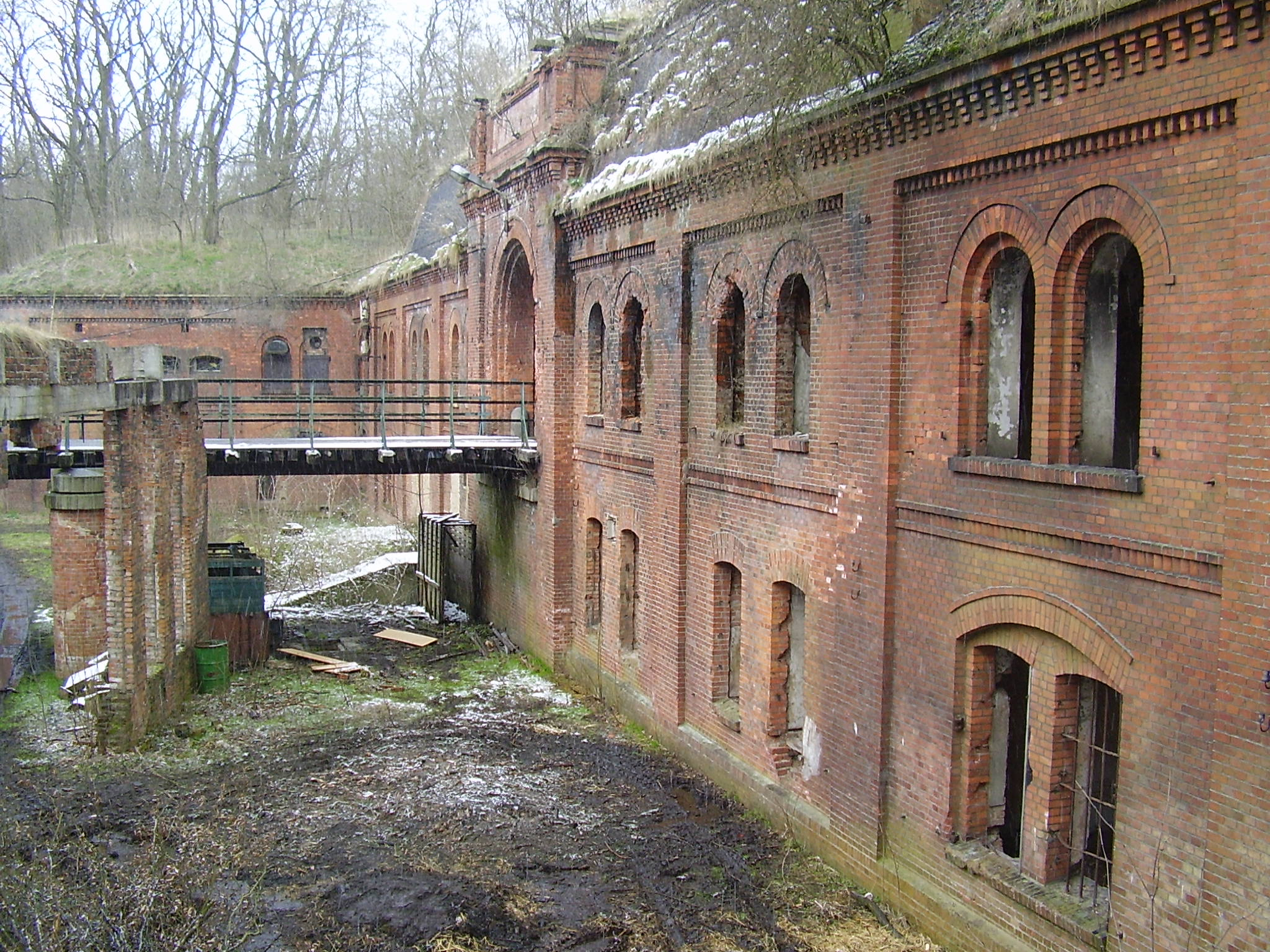
Fort III, one of the outer ring of forts built in the late 19th century

Poznań Fortress, known in German as Festung Posen (Polish: Twierdza Poznań) was a set of fortifications in the city of Poznań (German: Posen) in western Poland, built under Prussian rule in the 19th and early 20th centuries. It represents the third largest system of its kind in Europe.

The first set of fortifications was a tight defensive ring around central Poznań, including the main citadel called Fort Winiary (now the Cytadela park). Construction of these fortifications began in 1828. Later, beginning in 1876, an outer defensive ring was built around the perimeter of the city, consisting chiefly of a series of "forts", which mostly still survive.

The term Festung Posen was also used by the Nazi German occupiers during the Red Army's advance in the closing phases of the Second World War, to refer to Poznań's status as one of the "strongholds" (Festungen) which were to be defended at all costs. It fell in the Battle of Poznań (1945), with Fort Winiary the last point of resistance.

== Initial planning ==
Poznań (Posen) came under Prussian rule with the Second Partition of Poland in 1793. Its medieval city walls were obsolete by that time, and were mostly taken down in the early 19th century to facilitate the city's growth. The Prussian authorities first made plans to build new fortifications in December 1815. The city lay on the shortest route from the border with Congress Poland (and hence with the Russian Empire) to Berlin, and was also an important point on the route from West Prussia to Silesia; therefore, according to General Karl von Grolman, its fortification would show that Prussia had no intention of giving up those lands, and would defeat the "continuous intrigues and plotting" on the part of the Poles. A preliminary plan sketched by Grolman on 9 July 1817 provided for fortification of Winiary Hill north of the city, as well as the area of St. Kazimierz's Church in Śródka to the east. Army engineers added to these plans a weir on the river Warta (Warthe), which would enable the river to be used as part of the defences.

Building was planned to begin in 1817, but initially no funds were available for the work (due to the costs of fortifying Cologne and Koblenz). Planning continued, however: in 1823 Grolman proposed a line of defences surrounding the left-bank (main) portion of the city, with additional fortifications 500–1000 metres in front of the main line.

In 1827, Johann von Brese, then working in the War Ministry's engineering section, was instructed to prepare a detailed plan. The result, dated 23 March 1828, included the large fort on Winiary Hill, fortifications on the cathedral island (Ostrów Tumski) and the right bank, and the core defensive line surrounding the left-bank city. The plan was approved by General Gustav von Rauch (chief inspector of forts), and then presented by General Karl von Hake to King Frederick William III, who approved it in principle, asking Rauch to make some improvements. These were agreed on 18 June 1828 by a committee of officers headed by Rauch, and then supplemented by Rauch himself (it was due to Rauch that Grolman's proposed additional line in front of the main defences was excluded from the plans). The king gave his final approval on 14 August 1828, ordering Hake to begin construction with the Winiary fort and the weirs on the Warta and on the Wierzbak (Wierzbach) stream.

== Construction of the inner fortifications ==
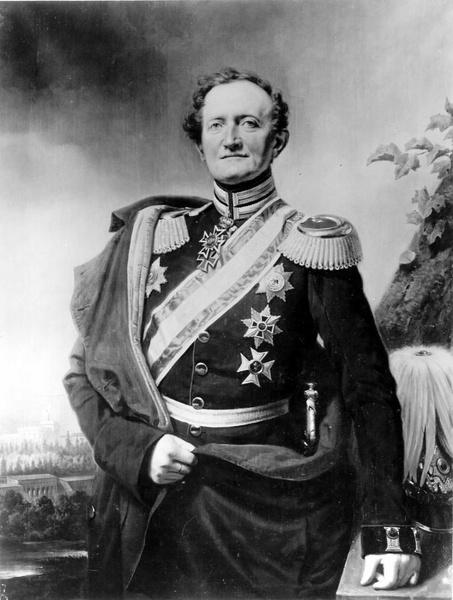
Johann von Brese, architect of the fortifications

On 14 March 1828 Captain Moritz von Prittwitz und Gaffron, who had been a member of Rauch's committee, was appointed chief of construction of Festung Posen. In May, he and five subordinate officers began marking out the outline of the first fortifications – the defensive barracks of the Winiary fort (later the reduit). Building began on 23 June 1828 (the fort would be completed in 1839). Fortification also soon began north of Poznań Cathedral and in the south-western part of the main defensive line. Work was carried out by the 5th Pioneers Division, re-stationed from Glogau (Głogów). Following the Polish November Uprising against Russia in 1830, the unfinished fortifications were manned temporarily for defensive purposes.

In 1829–1832 the Große Schleuse weir was built on the Warta. In October 1832 the main stream of the Warta was moved westwards, the former stream being closed off with an overfall weir (Große Überfall), connected to a seven-span defensive bridge. In 1832–1837 the Kleine Schleuse on the Wierzbak was built. The Dom Schleuse weir on the east side of Ostrów Tumski was built in 1834–1838, with the Dom Flesche lunette to the north. On 1 October 1834 Festung Posen was classified as a "Fortress Second Class", and completed parts of the fortifications were armed. Around 1837–1838 the Magazin Cavalier and Ziegel Flesche were built south of Fort Winiary. Work also proceeded on the right bank, where there were to be two forts connected by embankments. The northern embankment, containing Bydgoszcz Gate, was completed in 1839.

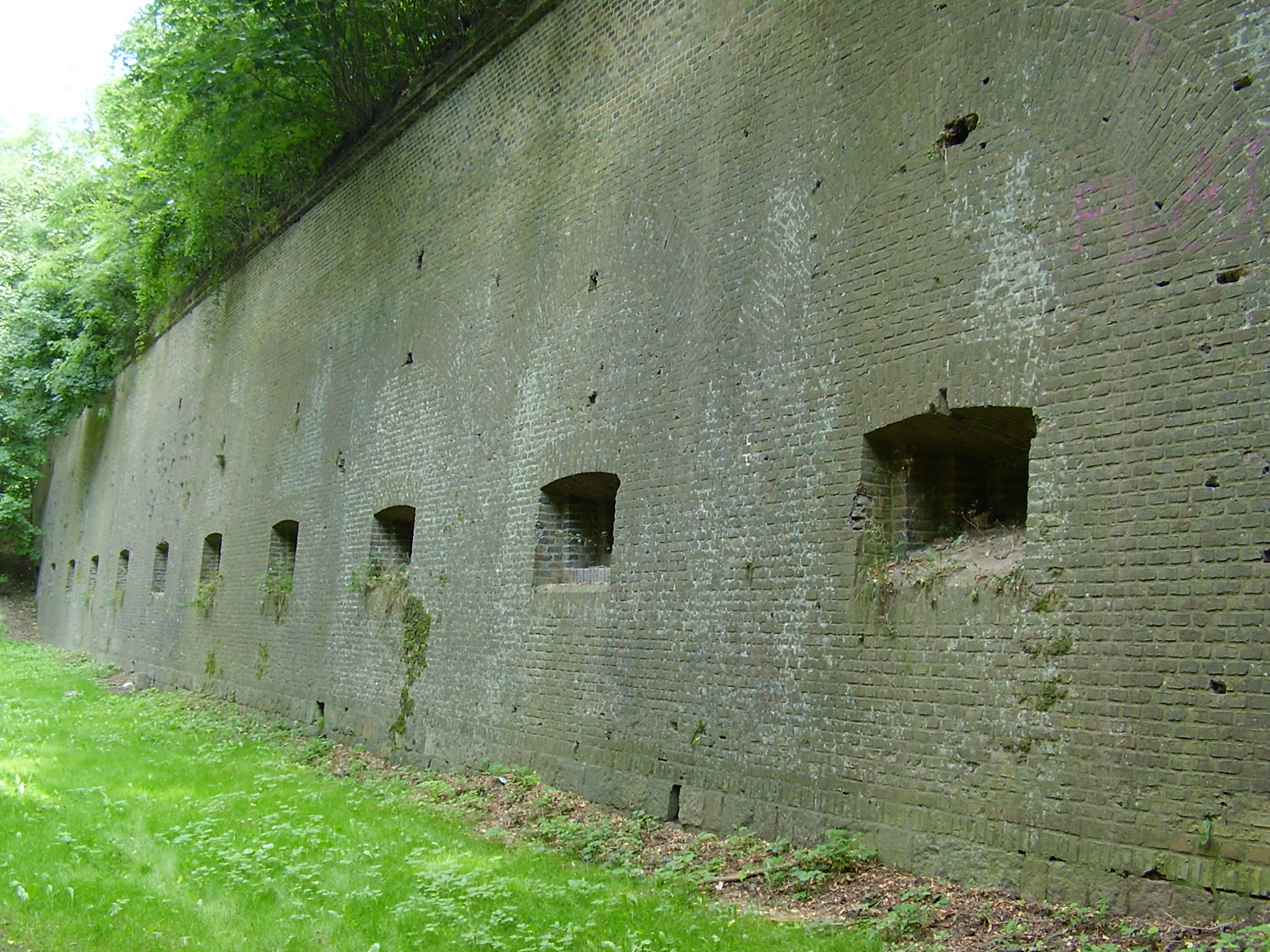
Ravelin I of Fort Winiary

On 16 March 1839 the king ordered a renewal of work on the fortifications, which had been suspended. Brese produced working plans on 1 February 1840, and the king approved an annual budget of 300,000 thalers. Work began again in March 1840, under a new director, Reichel (replaced by Lange in the 1850s). Bastions III and V were first to be built. Work was interrupted in 1848 due to the Greater Poland Uprising and "Spring of Nations". Later Bastions IV, VI, II and I were constructed, and in 1860–1861 connecting roads were built, as well as a number of brick blockhouses. This completed the ring (enceinte) around the left-bank city. Each of the six bastions had a large caponier shielded by embankments connected to the cavaliers. There was also a separate caponier on Grobla (Graben) island, beyond the Graben Schleuse weir.

Work also continued on the right bank, with the Reformaten Fort completed in 1842, and the Warsaw Gate in 1845, as well as the Cybina Cavalier, Cybina Schleuse, Cybina Flesche, and Fort Rochus (and adjacent embankments) to the south. The section containing the Kalisz Gate was last to be built.

Around 1850 it was decided to make an independent fortress on Ostrów Tumski. Canals were built east and west of the island, partly for flood prevention (Vorfluth Canal I and II), completed by 1864. Defences were built in the second half of the 1850s: Dom Redoute at the southern end of the island, embankments on the east and west sides of the island, and Dom Lünette in the north-west. Around 1862 the moat of Dom Redoute was completed.

In 1864 the Poznań Fortress was declared completed and reclassified as a fortress "of the first class". King Wilhelm I issued a decree renaming many of the elements of the fortifications in honour of Prussian generals.

Later alterations to the central ring of fortifications mainly resulted from the introduction of new types of armaments and ammunition, and the building of railway and tram lines. In 1869–1872 the north-eastern fortifications were rebuilt to allow the building of a railway to Toruń (Thorn). Powder stores were built and strengthened; in 1873–1874 the embankments around powder stores were widened. In 1875–1877 wooden bridges were mostly replaced with steel, and the gates in the fortifications were also strengthened. Ritter Thor was built in 1881–1882 to improve access to the city's new rail station.

By the 1890s the outer ring of forts had been built around the perimeter of the city, and much of the inner ring began to be demolished (see below). However the main forts remained in use. In 1910 reinforcement work took place at Fort Winiary, Fort Steinäcker and Cavalier Aster.

== Elements of the left-bank fortifications ==
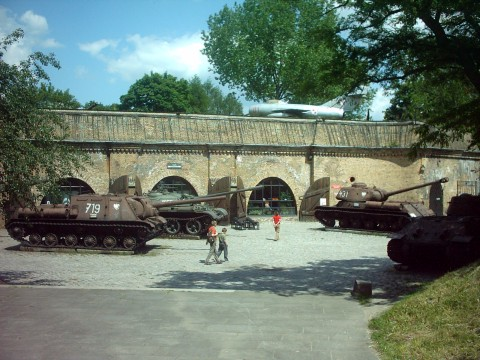
Spezial-Kriegs-Laboratorium at Fort Winiary, now a military museum

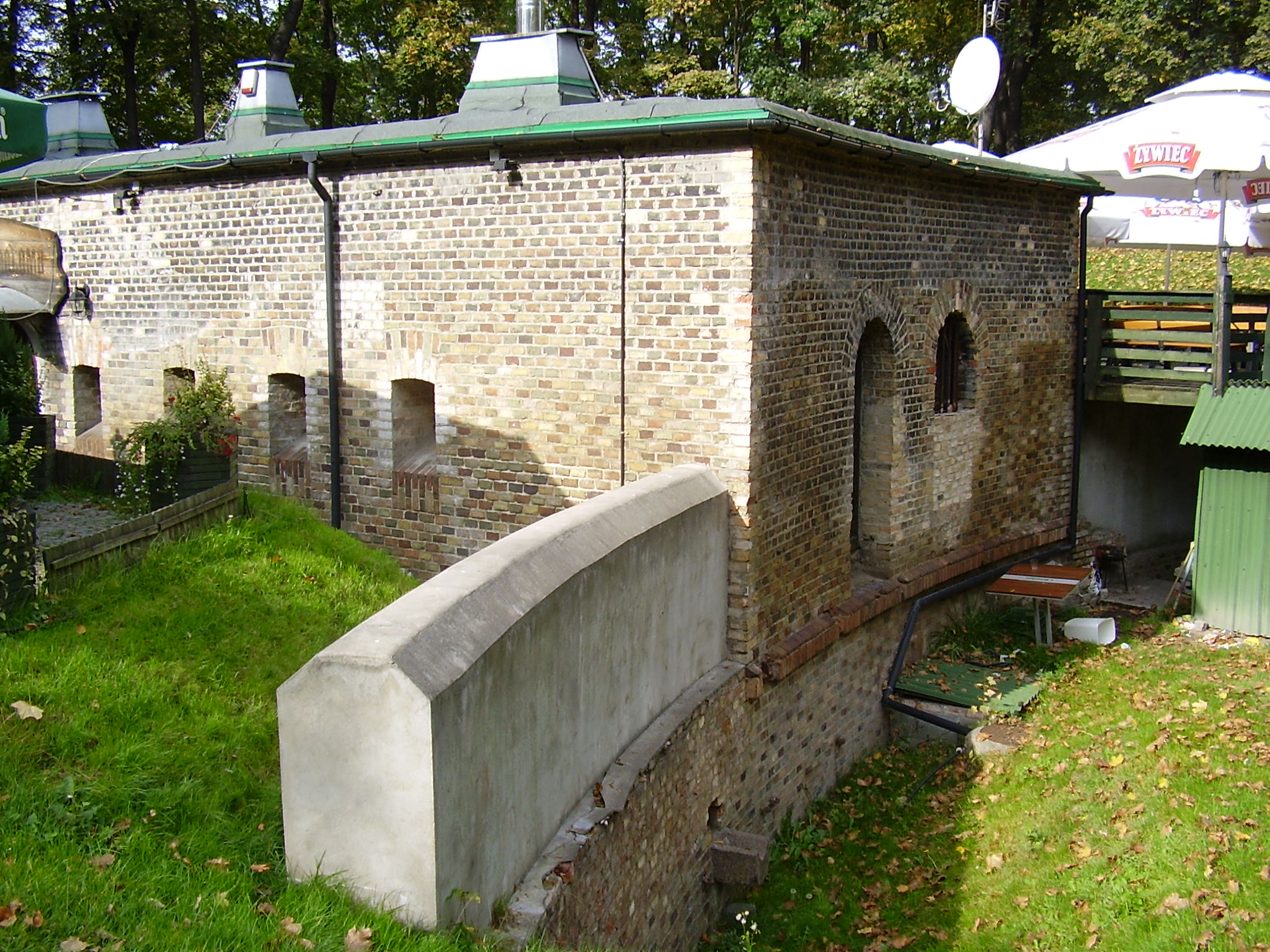
Blockhouse of Bastion Colomb on ul. Powstańców Wielkopolskich

The following were the main elements of the ring of fortifications on the left bank of the Warta (listed in anti-clockwise order):

- Fort Winiary. The main fort, lying north of the city as it was then, and popularly known as Poznań's citadel; converted after World War II into the Cytadela park. For details of its construction and history, see Poznań Citadel.
- Kleine Schleuse ("Little Lock"), a weir built in 1832–1837 on the Wierzbak (Wierzbach) stream which flowed eastwards towards the Warta (this part of the stream is now combined with the Bogdanka and flows in underground drainage pipes). The weir was connected to the western end of Fort Winiary's reduit to the north, and to Fort Adalbert (Hake) to the south.
- Fort Adalbert, renamed Fort Hake in 1864. Built in the 1830s on the north side of the hill containing St. Wojciech's (St. Adalbert's) church.
- Ziegel Flesche ("Brick Lunette", named for a brickworks on the Wierzbak), later Waldersee Flesche, a lunette situated somewhat west of the fortifications running south from Fort Adalbert, being connected to them by a long gorge. Built in the late 1830s.
- Magazin Cavalier, a fortified embankment between Fort Adalbert and Bastion VI, built 1837–1838.
- Bastion VI, renamed Bastion Waldersee in 1864. It stood close to the junction of today's Al. Niepodległości and ul. Solna; the western line of fortifications generally follows today's Al. Niepodległości and ul. Kościuszki. Between Bastion VI and Bastion V was Cavalier VI (Cavalier Bonin from 1864).
- Bastion V, renamed Bastion Tietzen in 1864, north of where the Zamek ("Imperial Castle") building now stands. Connected to Bastion IV by Cavalier V (Cavalier Stockhausen). To the west was an additional caponier close to the then railway station, now built in under the Rondo Kaponiera roundabout at the western end of Święty Marcin.
- Bastion IV, renamed Bastion Colomb in 1864. Stood partly on the site of the park on ul. Powstańców Wielkopolskich west of Al. Niepodległości. A blockhouse survives; it was excavated and restored in 1998, and now houses a pub. Between Bastion IV and Bastion III was Cavalier IV (Cavalier Strotha).
- Bastion III, renamed Bastion Grolman in 1864 and Reduta Przemysława after World War I. Connected to Bastion II by Cavalier III (Cavalier Rohr). It stood close to today's Plac Andersa. Bastions and Cavaliers I–III formed the southern edge of the fortifications, with a partial moat in front.
- Bastion II, renamed Bastion Brünneck in 1864. Connected to Bastion I by Cavalier II (Cavalier Witzleben).
- Bastion I, renamed Bastion Röder in 1864, close to the west bank of the Warta. Running east from it onto the then island of Grobla (Graben) was Cavalier I (Cavalier Boyen).
- Graben Schleuse or Grabendamm, within Cavalier I, an overfall weir on the branch of the river west of Grobla. It regulated the water level in that branch and in the moat of the southern fortifications.

== Elements of the right-bank fortifications ==
The following were the main elements of the fortifications on the right bank of the Warta:

- Fort Rochus, renamed Fort Rauch in 1864, and Fort św. Rocha (later Reduta Marcinkowskiego) after World War I. It guarded the southern end of the right-bank fortifications, close to today's St. Roch bridge. There was a caponier to the west of the fort, on the river bank. The gunneries survived the demolitions in the 1920s.
- Cybina Cavalier, renamed Cavalier Aster in 1864, on the south bank of the Cybina stream, near what is now the western end of Lake Malta. In 1869–1870 a powder store (no. 6) was built there, and in 1872 a powder laboratory. The cavalier was reinforced in 1910.
- Cybina Flesche (Lünette), built 1845–1846, renamed Lünette Aster in 1864, and Reduta (Warownia) Rusa after World War I. Lay to the east of Cavalier Aster, in the area of today's Lake Malta.
- Cybina Schleuse ("Cybina Lock"), on the Cybina by Cavalier Aster. The southern gate was filled in after World War II, but the northern one remains in use (it has been extended). It lies under ul. Jana Pawła II, and is visible when the river water level is low.
- Reformaten Fort, renamed Fort Prittwitz-Gaffron in 1864, and Reduta (Warownia) Reformatów after World War I, completed 1842. Built on the hill next to the liquidated abbey by St. Kazimierz's Church in Śródka, on today's ul. Podwale. The lower floor of the reduit is still in existence.

== Fortifications on Ostrów Tumski ==
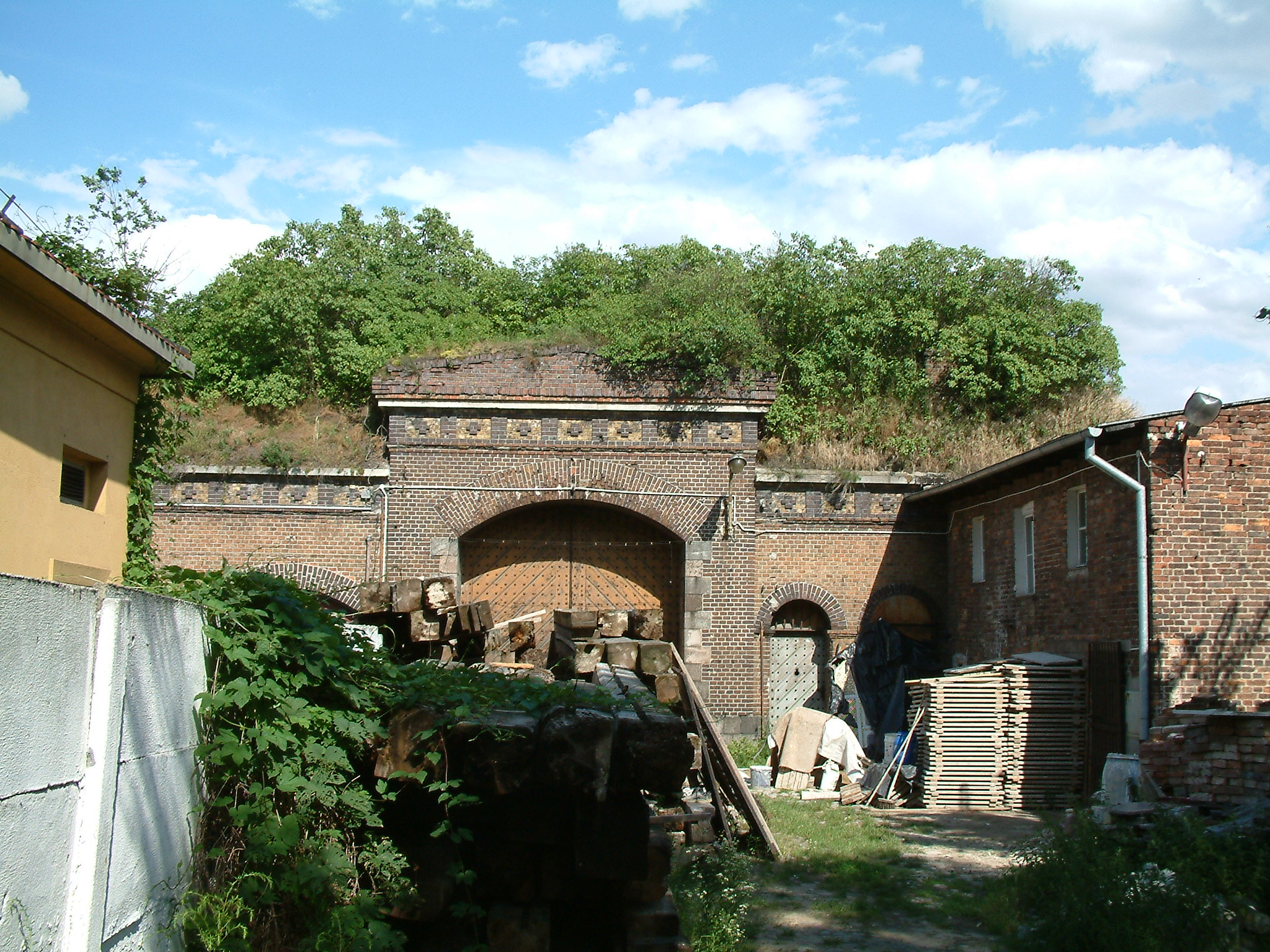
Remains of Dom Schleuse

The following were the main elements of the fortifications on Ostrów Tumski (the cathedral island):

- Dom Schleuse ("Cathedral Lock"), a weir and bridge built in 1834–1838 on the eastern branch of the Warta (called Cybina). The lock was demolished after World War I, but the west bridgehead survives (on the eastern edge of Ostrów Tumski, close to the cathedral).
- Nördlicher Dom Cavalier ("North Cathedral Cavalier"), completed in 1832, north of the cathedral. In 1861 a powder store was built, with a capacity of 51 tonnes.
- Domwerk II (previously Hauptwerk No II or Dom Lünette), a fortified position at the western end of the North Cathedral Cavalier.
- Fort Radziwill (originally Dom Redoute or Domwerk I), renamed Reduta (Warownia) Radziwiłła after World War I, built in the late 1850s at the southern end of Ostrów Tumski. It had a moat (completed in 1862). The fort survived the demolitions of the 1920s.
- Dom Flesche, later Fort Steinäcker, a lunette some way north of the cathedral, built in the 1830s. In 1836 an embankment was made in front, also shielding a new access road. In the early 1870s the river's eastern branch (Cybina) was made to take a more northerly course, placing Fort Steinäcker on Ostrów Tumski. The fort was reinforced in 1910. After World War I it was renamed Reduta (Warownia) Lecha.
- Fort Roon, built at the eastern end of the Great Lock (initially there was a smaller fort there, called Brückenkopf). It was renamed Reduta (Warownia) Czech after World War I. The reduit survives, situated on the site of the cogeneration plant in the north of Ostrów Tumski, and can be seen from the east bank of the Warta.
- Große Schleuse ("Great Lock"), a weir also serving as a bridge, built on the main branch of the Warta in 1829–1832, just to the east of Fort Winiary. Later the weir gate was widened to allow larger ships to sail into the city. The weir was demolished after World War I, but the bridgeheads can still be seen.

== Gates ==
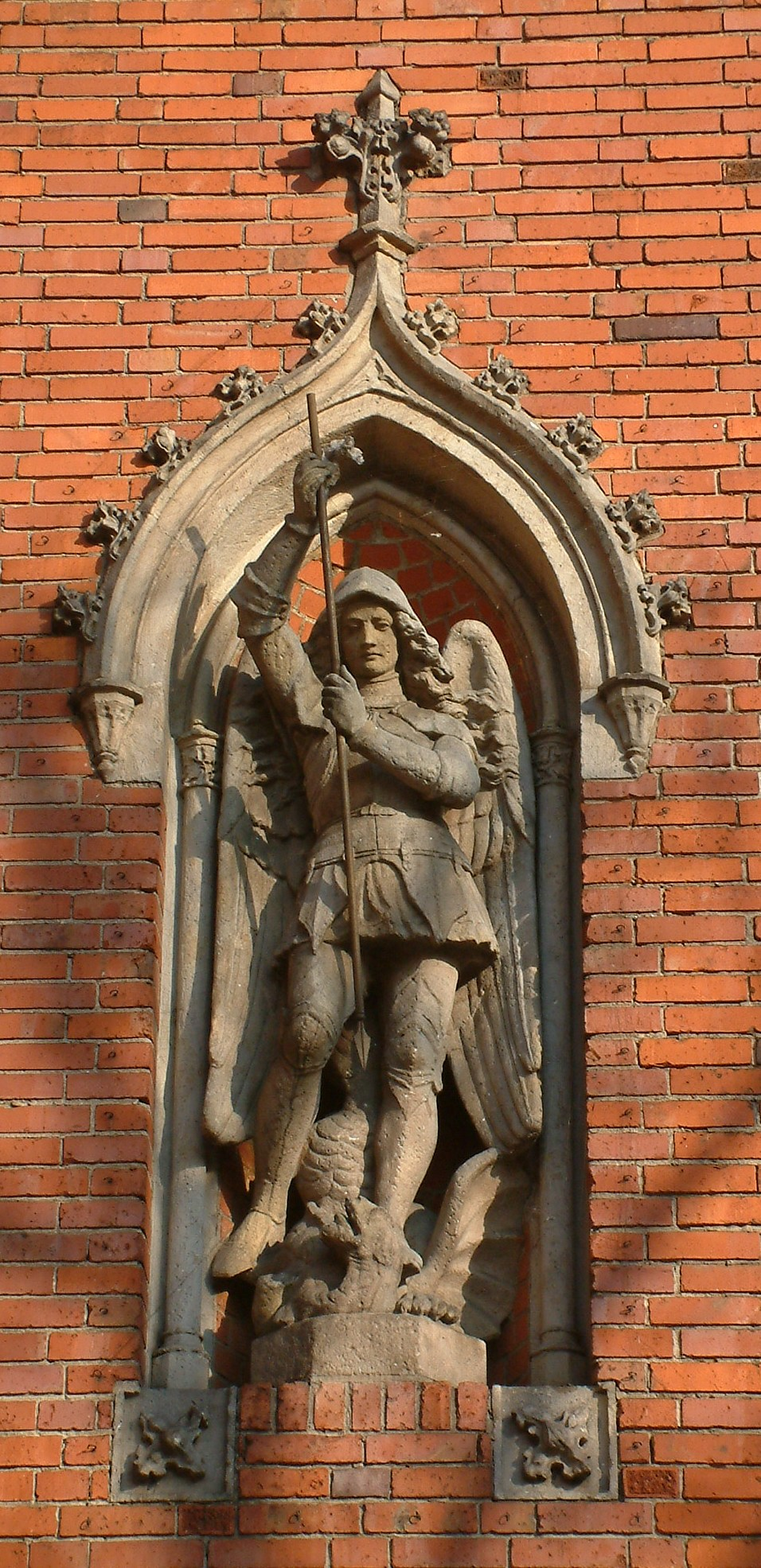
Figure of Archangel Michael by Ludwig Stürmer, 1855, from the former Eichwald Thor (moved in 1908 to a school building on today's ul. Słowackiego)

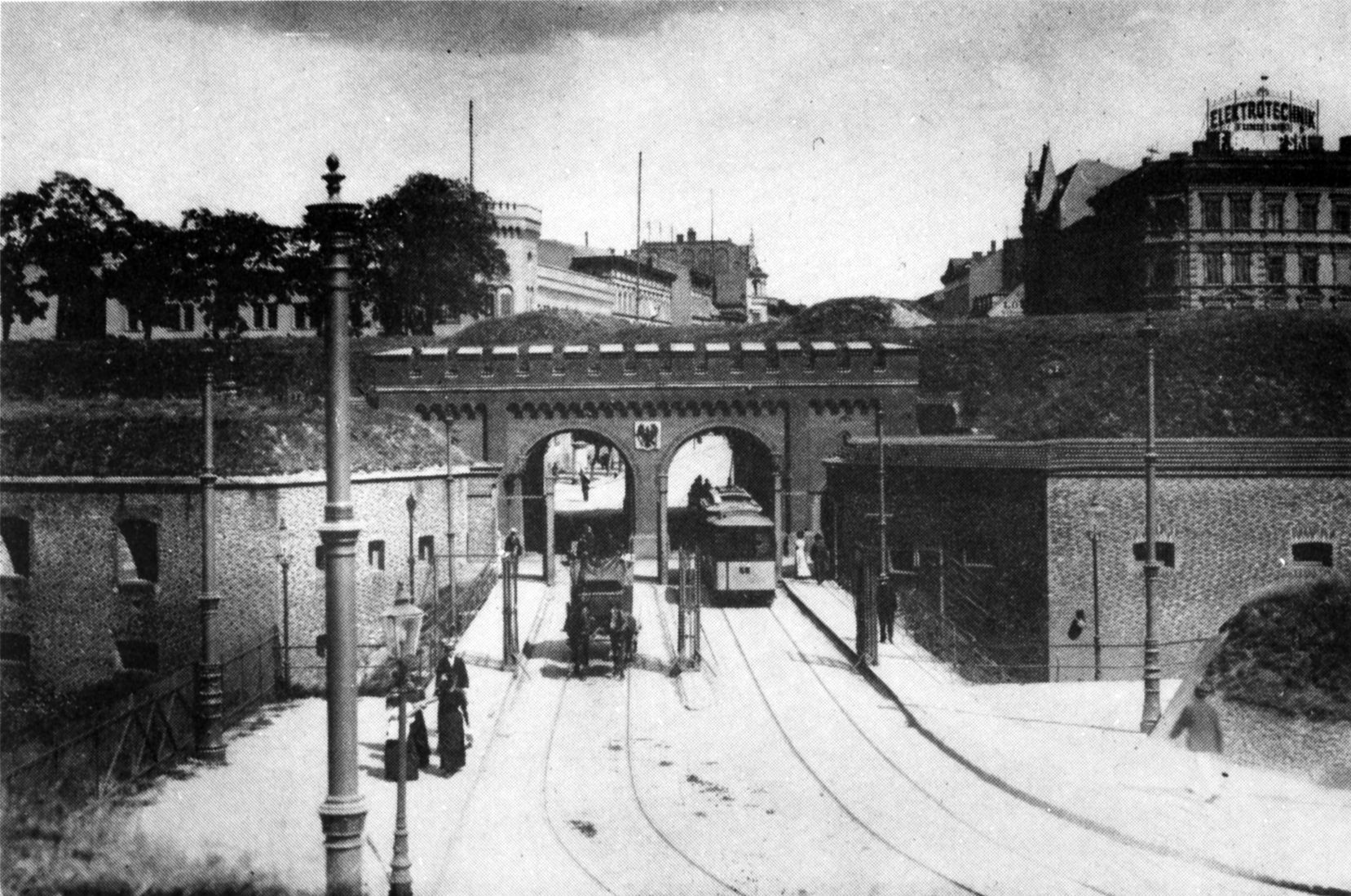
Berlin Gate - 1890

Gates had to be built to allow access into and out of the area enclosed by the ring of fortifications. The following four gates, in the northerly parts of the fortifications, were built in the 1830s:

- Schillings Thor (known in Polish as Brama Szelągowska), between Fort Winiary and the Great Lock, on the road to the settlement of Szeląg (Schilling), now ul. Szelągowska.
- Kirchhofs Thor ("Churchyard Gate", Polish Brama Cmentarna), between the Little Lock and the cemeteries on the south-western slope of Fort Winiary (where the military cemeteries are situated today). The gate gave access to the road to Oborniki (today's Al. Armii Poznań). In 1889–1894 it was replaced by a blockhouse on the railway which had been built there.
- Mühl Thor ("Mill Gate", Brama Młyńska), by Fort Adalbert, on the road leading to a mill on the Wierzbak, roughly today's ul. Przepadek.
- Bromberger Thor ("Bydgoszcz Gate", Brama Bydgoska), in the fortified embankments east of the Cathedral Lock, on the road to Bydgoszcz (Bromberg), now ul. Bydgoska in Śródka. The gate and the fortified section containing it were completed in 1839.

The following other gates were built in later periods:

- Wilda Thor ("Wilda Gate", Polish Brama Wildecka), built from 1841 between Bastions II and III, on the road to Wilda (today's ul. Półwiejska, near the junction with ul. Krakowska).
- Berliner Thor ("Berlin Gate", Brama Berlińska), built 1843–1850 between Bastions IV and V, widened in 1867–1869, adapted for tram traffic in 1880. This was the city's main gate, on the line of St. Martin's Street (Święty Marcin), leading to the roads to Berlin and Głogów (Glogau) and to the original rail station in Jeżyce (on the site of today's Old Zoo).
- Warschauer Thor ("Warsaw Gate", Brama Warszawska), built 1845, on the road to the Komadoria district and to Warsaw, in the region of today's Rondo Śródka roundabout.
- Warthe Thor ("Warta Gate"), on the right bank close to Fort Rauch, giving access from outside the fortifications to the Berdychowo neighbourhood and the ferry to Grobla.
- Kuhndorfer Thor (Brama Kundorfska), later Königs Thor ("King's Gate", Brama Królewska), built c. 1849–1852, on today's ul. Libelta, then the road leading to the settlement of Ku(h)ndorf and westward to Jeżyce.
- Graben Pforte, built 1853–1856, a small gate giving access from Grobla (Graben) to the ferry to Berdychowo.
- Eichwald Thor (Brama Dębińska), not part of the original plans, but built after 1855, leading to Dębina (Eichwald), near the southern end of today's ul. Garbary.
- Kalischer Thor ("Kalisz Gate", Brama Kaliska), on the right bank, at the northern side of Fort Rauch, on the road to Kalisz. It was retained as a monument when most of the fortifications were demolished after World War I. It stood on today's ul. Berdychowo.
- A gate built c. 1865 near Bastion IV, for a rail siding leading inside the ring, near today's ul. Taylora.
- Ritter Thor ("Knight's Gate", Brama Rycerska), built 1881–1882 in Cavalier Strotha (at the southern end of today's ul. Ratajczaka), leading to the sidings of the new rail station.

== Construction of the outer forts ==
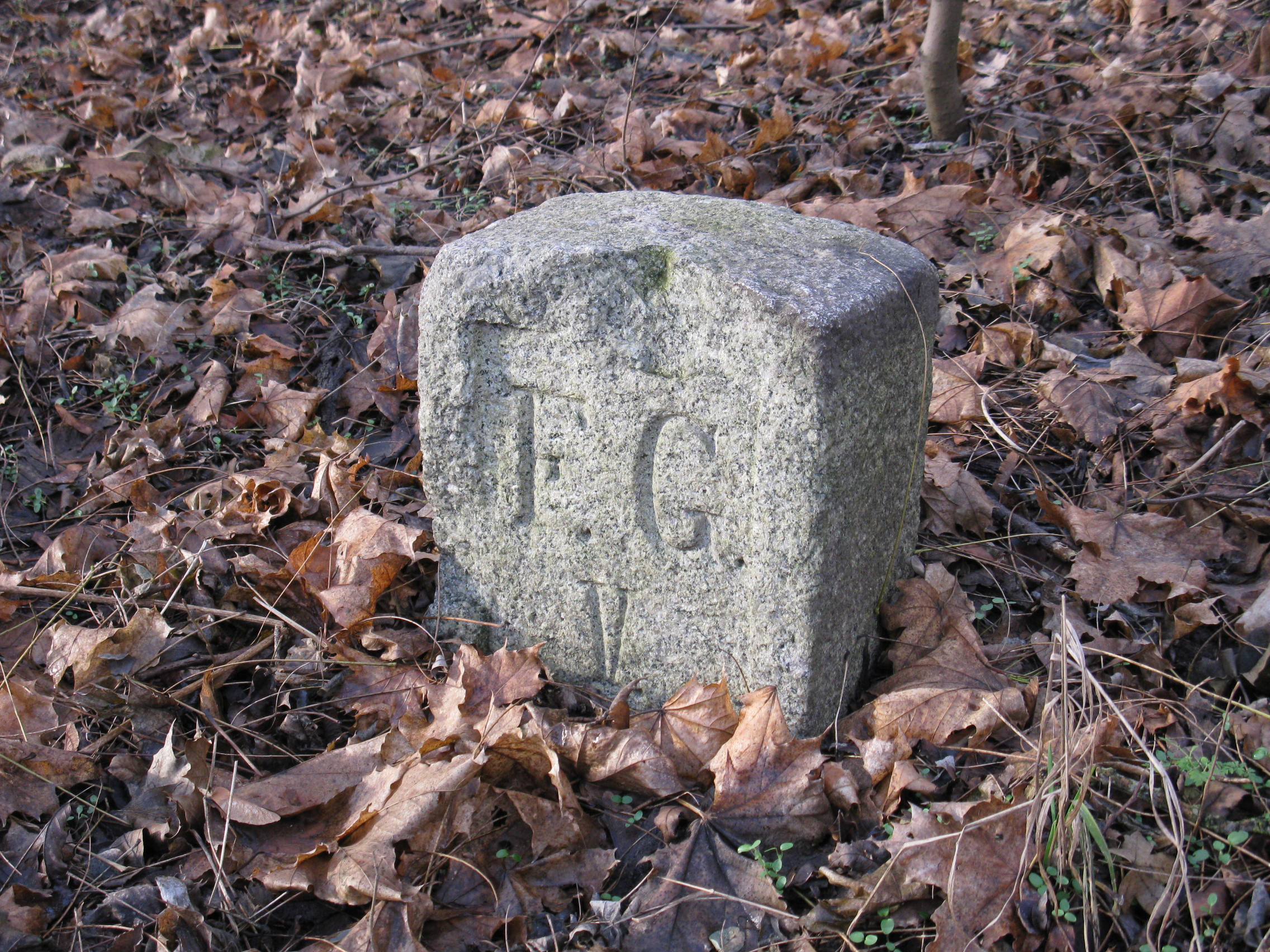
Boundary stone of Fort IVa

The Siege of Sevastopol (1854–1855) and that of Dybbøl during the Danish War of 1864 showed the concept of a tight ring of fortifications to be outdated, as it could be broken relatively easily by modern artillery. The ring was also weakened by the need for railway lines to pass through it. This led the Engineering Committee of the Chief Inspectorate of Forts to consider, in the 1860s, the possibility of modernization. It was decided to build an outer ring of artillery forts, spaced at 2–6 km, and 6 km from the existing inner ring.

Following work by the Landes-Verteidigungs-Kommission and a report from Field Marshal von Moltke concerning the Franco-Prussian War, King Wilhelm issued a decree on 5 November 1871 ordering the commission to prepare plans for necessary changes to fortifications in the united Germany. A further decree of 24 June 1872 reduced the number of fortress cities to 49. Festung Posen was among 17 strongholds which were to be modernized so as to be able to withstand a siege.

Preparations for new building had begun in 1869, resulting in two preliminary plans. One provided for 11 main forts and 8 intermediate forts (Zwischenwerk) at a radius of 6–7 km, the other for 6 main and 3 intermediate forts at a radius of 3 km.

Decrees of 24 June 1872 and 29 May 1873 laid down plans for fortifications in the Empire and permitted the confiscation of land for that purpose. A preliminary plan was completed on 1 June 1873, containing 8 main forts and 3 intermediate forts. This was presented to the Commission by a decree of 31 March 1874; the Commission completed its work on the plan on 7 April 1874, and it was approved by the War Ministry in a decree of 17 November 1874. The final plans were approved 24 February 1876, providing for 9 main forts (designed by Hans Alexis von Biehler) and 3 intermediate ones. An act of the Reichstag of 30 May 1873 allocated over 7 million thalers for the project (the fifth largest amount granted for fort modernization). French prisoners-of-war were also used as free labour.

The main forts were built in a ring of diameter 9.5 km at regular intervals of 3–4 km, forming a defensive line about 30 kilometres (19 mi) long, located 2.0–4.5 km from the inner ring. Gaps in the ring at the Bogdanka and Warta valleys were filled with intermediate forts (Forts IVa and IXa in the Warta valley, and VIa between the Bogdanka and Wierzbak). The easternmost Fort III, quite distant from the others, was reinforced by three permanent artillery batteries. All the forts were to be connected by a road network, based on a circular road a few hundred metres behind the forts, and radial roads leading to the inner ring. Large shooting ranges were built at Komandoria and Główna in the north-east of the city, and two training grounds at Górczyn and Karolin.

Work began in 1876, with the marking of the boundaries of the fort sites (with stones marked F.G. for Festungs-Grenze). Work then began with the forts on the Berlin road, to make up for the weakening of the inner ring caused by the new railway station. Next the southern and eastern forts were built. The northern Forts V and VI, were built last, and were modified by the addition of a second embankment.

Each fort took about four years to build, the last (Fort V) being completed in 1886. The circular road was completed in the same period.

New missiles using nitrocellulose, introduced in 1883, were shown in tests at Kummersdorf to be effective against standard fortifications. A still stronger explosive material – melinite – was introduced in 1886 by France and 1888 by Germany. As a consequence, the commission worked from 1885 to 1887 on strengthening the Prussian fort system. The conclusion was that the artillery had to be more distributed rather than being concentrated in forts, and the forts themselves were to be defended from attack from all sides, serving as strong points of infantry resistance, largely using machine guns. The role of linear fortifications was reduced to a minimum.

A decree of 10 December 1888 ordered a review of the fortification system, leading to a decree of 9 May 1889, in which Festung Posen was one of the 17 fort systems "of the highest importance" designated for modernization. A decree of 13 May 1887 had already provided for expansion of the fortified areas around Poznań, Metz and Strasbourg, and work in Poznań began the same year. Over a few years the intermediate forts Ia, IIa, IIIa, Va, VIIa and VIIIa were built, completed in 1896 according to official records.

Thus a regular ring was formed, with alternating main and intermediate forts, spaced at around 2 km. Between Forts VIa and VII was a permanent battery (Bogdanka), of a similar size to the intermediate forts. The ring was reinforced by 43 shelters for infantry, ammunition and artillery, mostly in the north between Forts IV and VIII. South of Fort III a weir was built on the Cybina. A peacetime powder store was built on the Warsaw road near Fort IIIa, as well as two new shooting ranges near Forts IIIa and VII. At the same time all main forts and the three oldest intermediate forts underwent modernization. The work required an increase in the size of the Poznań garrison, which led to the building of a barracks complex in the area of today's Bukowska and Grunwaldzka streets.

A further change in concept was laid down in a decree of 23 January 1900. Festung Posen was again placed in the highest category, this time of "large fortresses". It needed to be strengthened following the removal of the inner ring on the left bank. New shelters were built in the southern and eastern sections, ten for infantry, three for artillery and three for ammunition. Other modernization work also took place, completed around 1907. With rising political tensions, a decree of 15 May 1913 ordered the construction of new forts to create a wider ring, but this never occurred. However over a hundred shelters of various types were built around existing forts.

== The perimeter forts and their present-day state ==
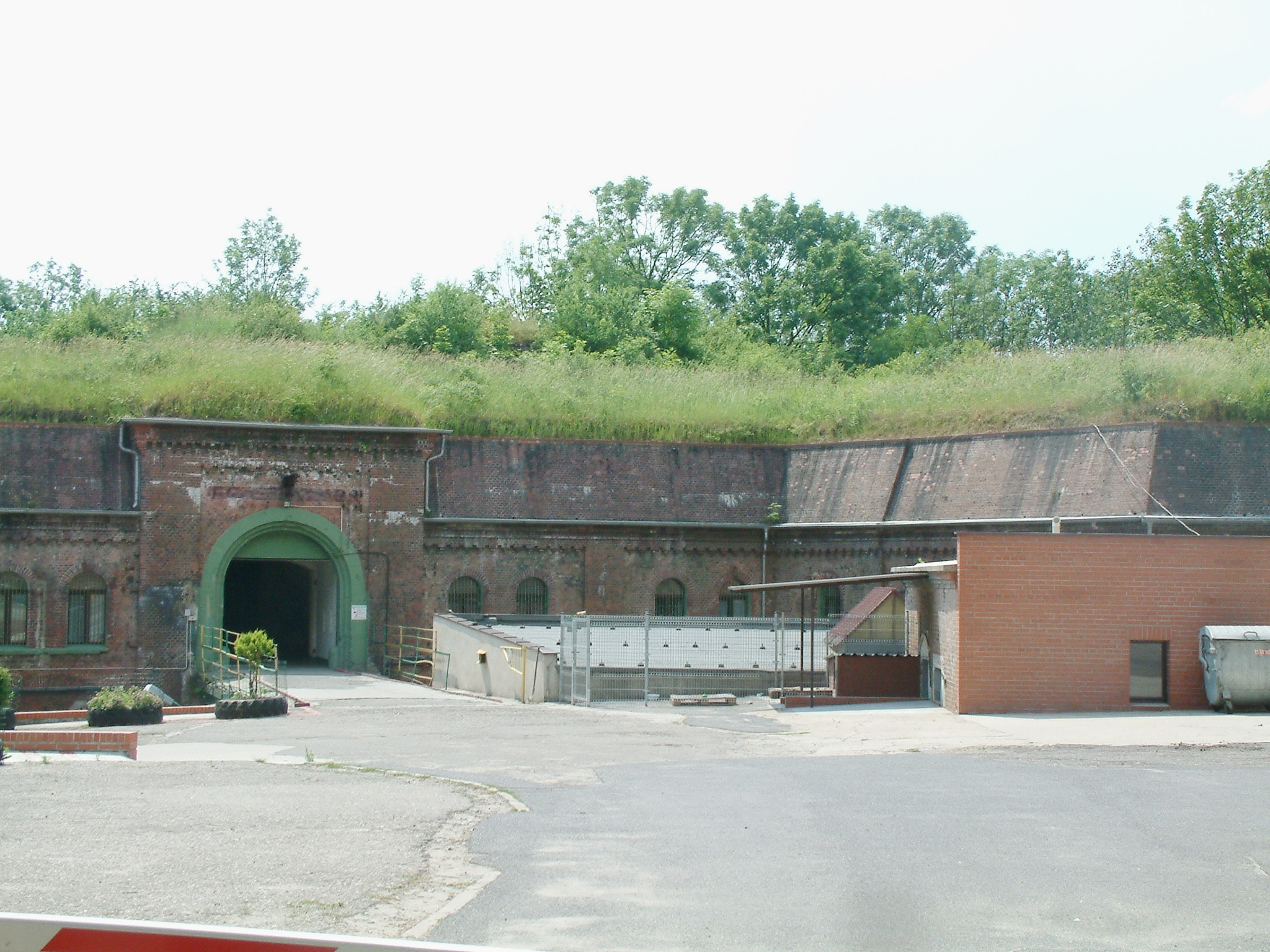
Fort I in Starołęka

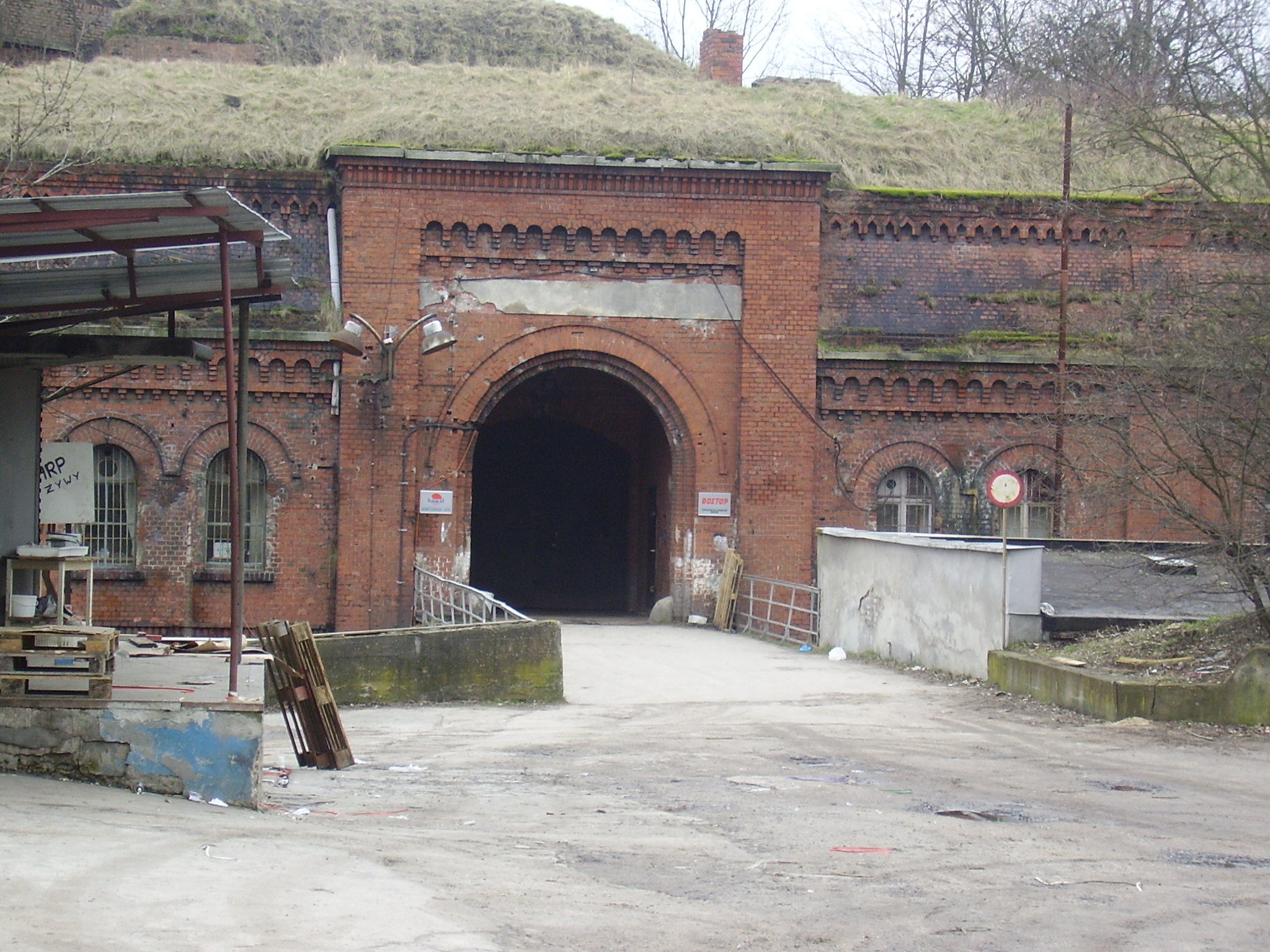
Fort II in Żegrze (Rataje)

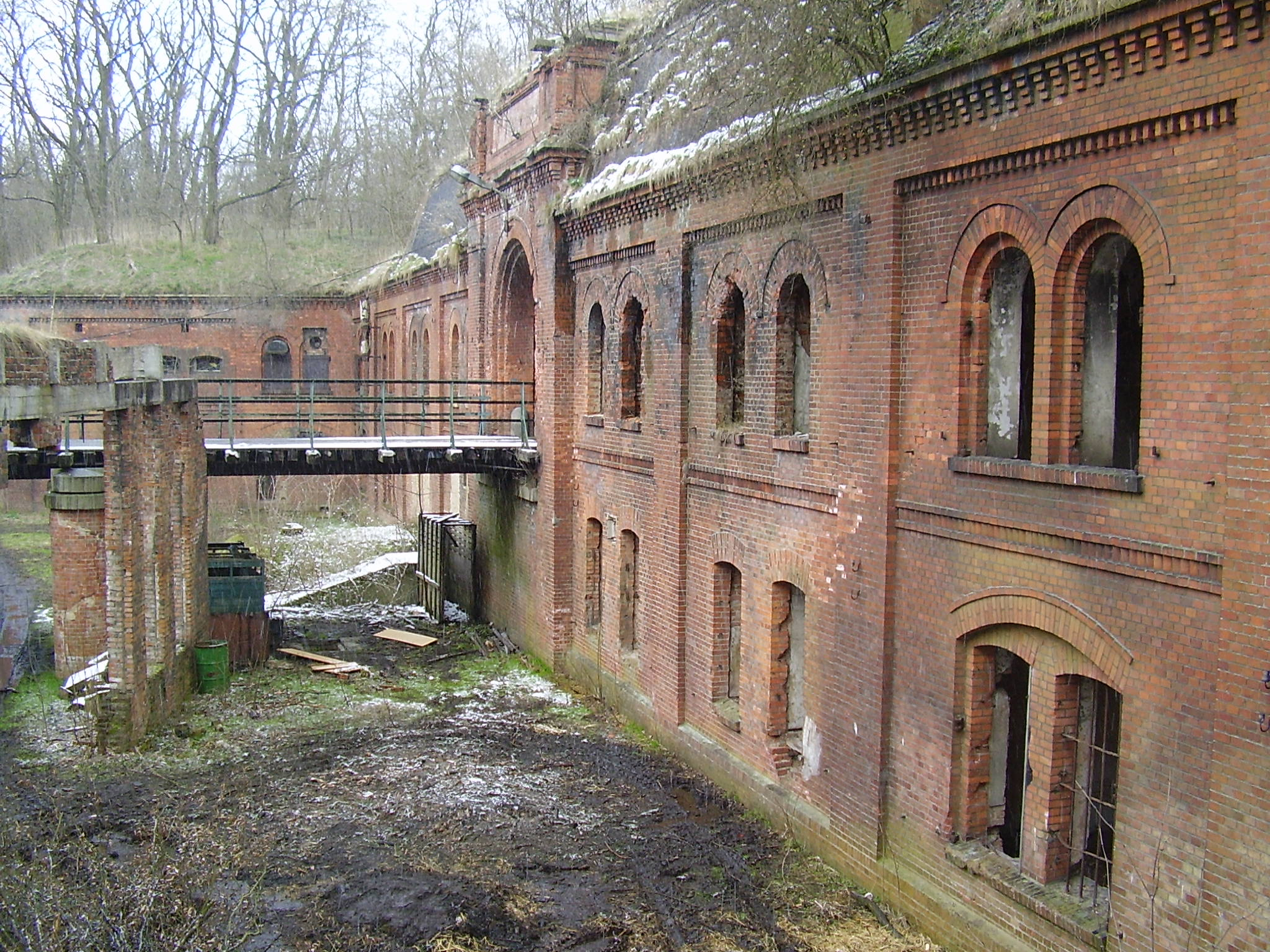
Fort III on the site of the zoo in Nowe Miasto

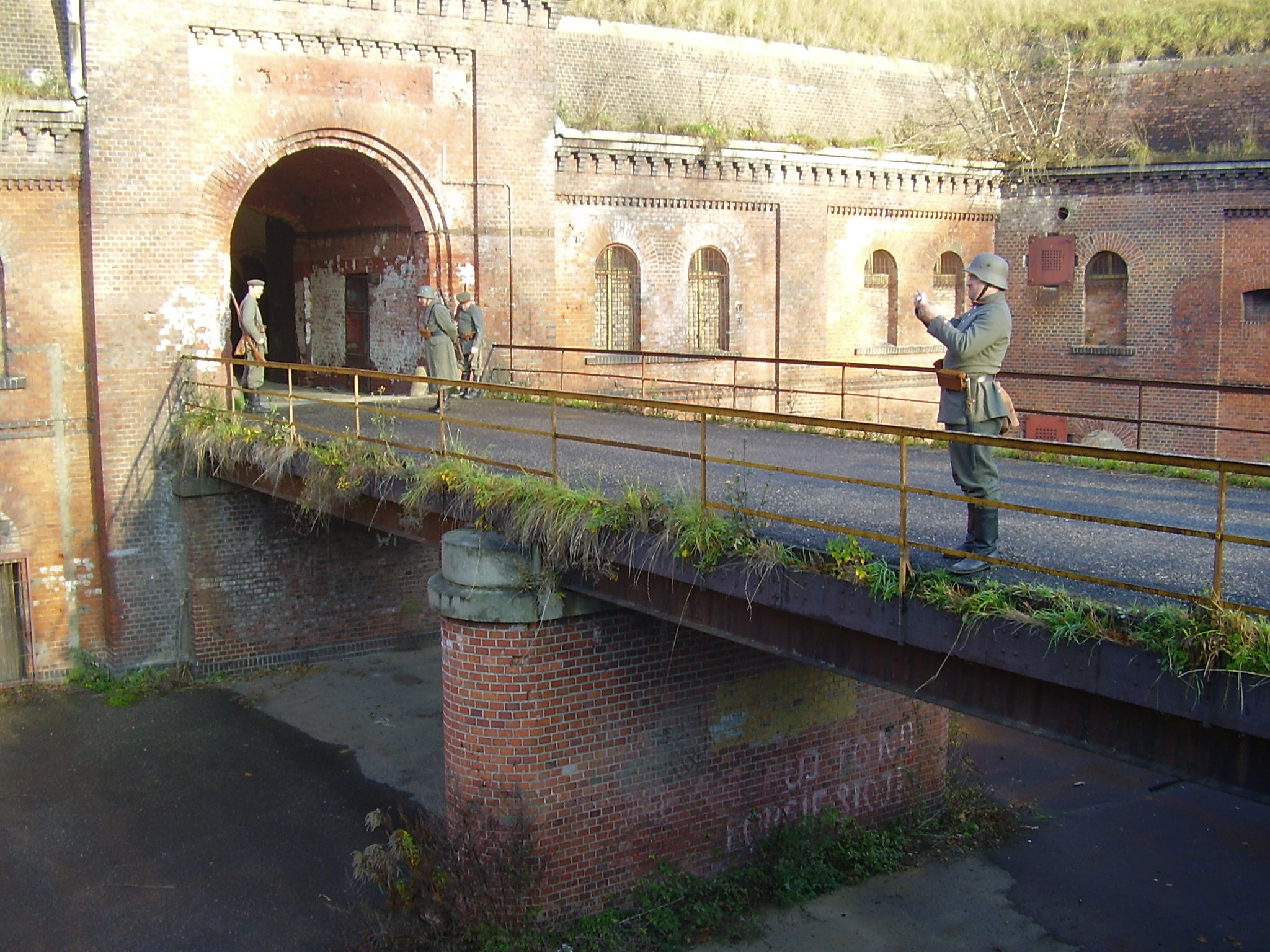
Fort VI in Jeżyce

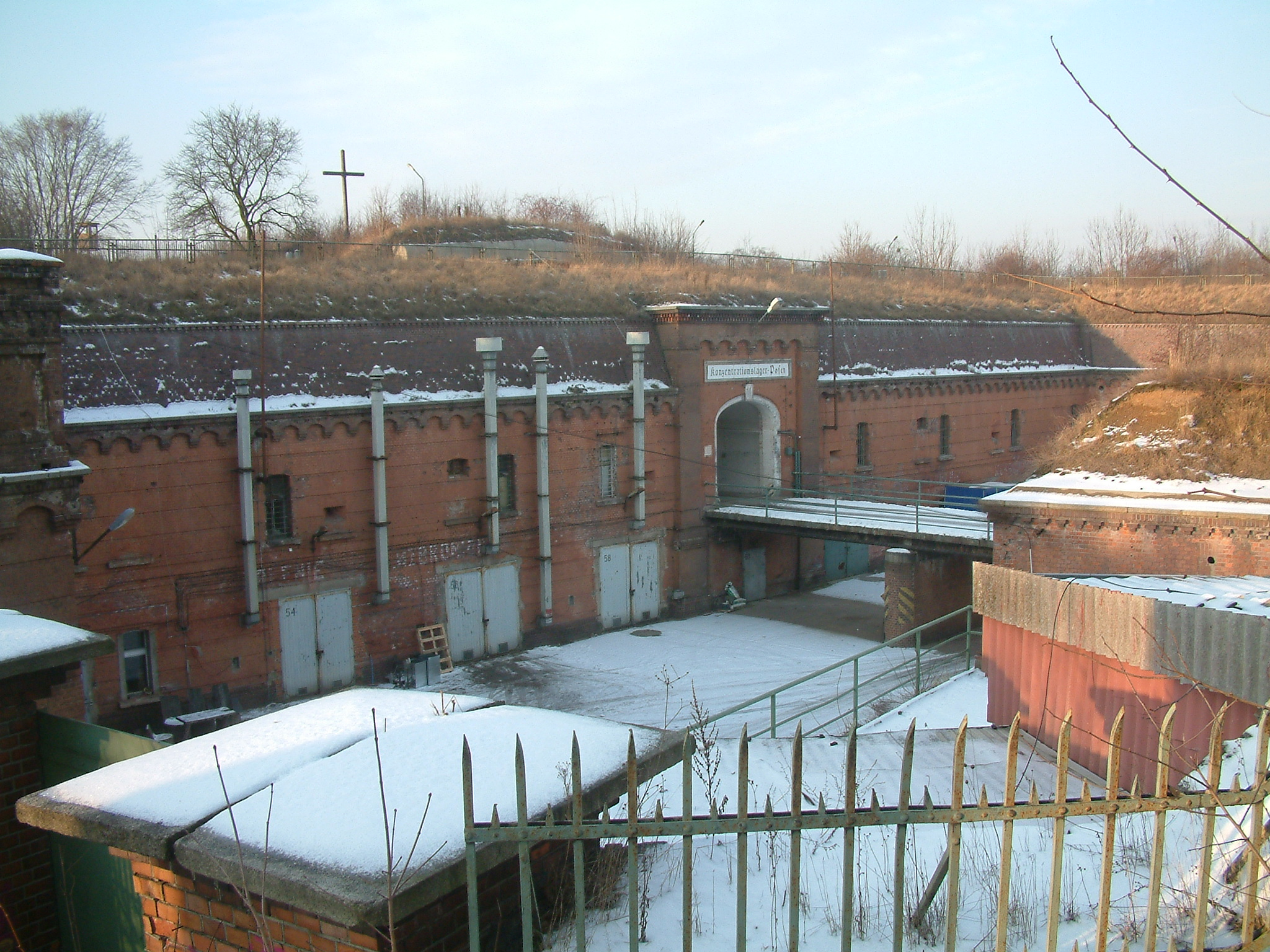
Fort VII in Ogrody

The main forts in the outer ring are as follows:

- Fort I (Röder). Built 1878–1880, lies on ul. Książęca in Starołęka. In 1944 converted to a Focke-Wulf aircraft factory, with rail access from Poznan-Starołęka station. Still partly used industrially.
- Fort II (Stülpnagel). Built 1878–1882, lies on ul. Obodrzycka in Żegrze (Rataje). In 1944 converted to a Focke-Wulf factory, with rail connections and a siding.
- Fort III (Gröber). Built 1877–1881. Lies within the New Zoo. Barracks were to be converted into a dolphinarium; the roof was removed, but the project not completed.
- Fort IV (Hake). Built 1878–1882. Lies in Karolin, on ul. Bałtycka. Was on the site of an ammunitions factory during World War II, after which it was demolished. Some fragments remain.
- Fort V (Waldersee I). Built 1879–1883. Lies on ul. Lechicka, by Osiedle Wichrowe Wzgórze in Winogrady. Moats were roofed in World War II and used as ammunition stores (later filled in). Front caponier and other fragments survive.
- Fort VI (Tietzen). Built 1879–1883. Lies at the junction of ul. Lutycka and ul. Strzeszyńska in Jeżyce. Used by the military after 1945, survives in good condition.
- Fort VII (Colomb). Built 1876–1880 (modernized 1887–1888). Lies on Al. Polska in the Ogrody district. During World War II it was the first Nazi concentration camp set up on Polish territory. Up to 20,000 Poles, mostly from the Wielkopolska region, died there through execution, torture and harsh conditions. It is now a martyrs' museum.
- Fort VIII (Grolman). Built 1876–1882. Lies on ul. Grunwaldzka and ul. Bułgarska, next to the Lech Poznań football stadium.
- Fort IX (Brünneck). Built 1876–1880. Lies in Świerczewo (Wilda), on ul. Głazowa. Was fully roofed to provide a large storage area. Survives in good condition, partly used industrially (also contains a disused police car-park). The hills in the park around it are used by cyclists and other recreational vehicle drivers.

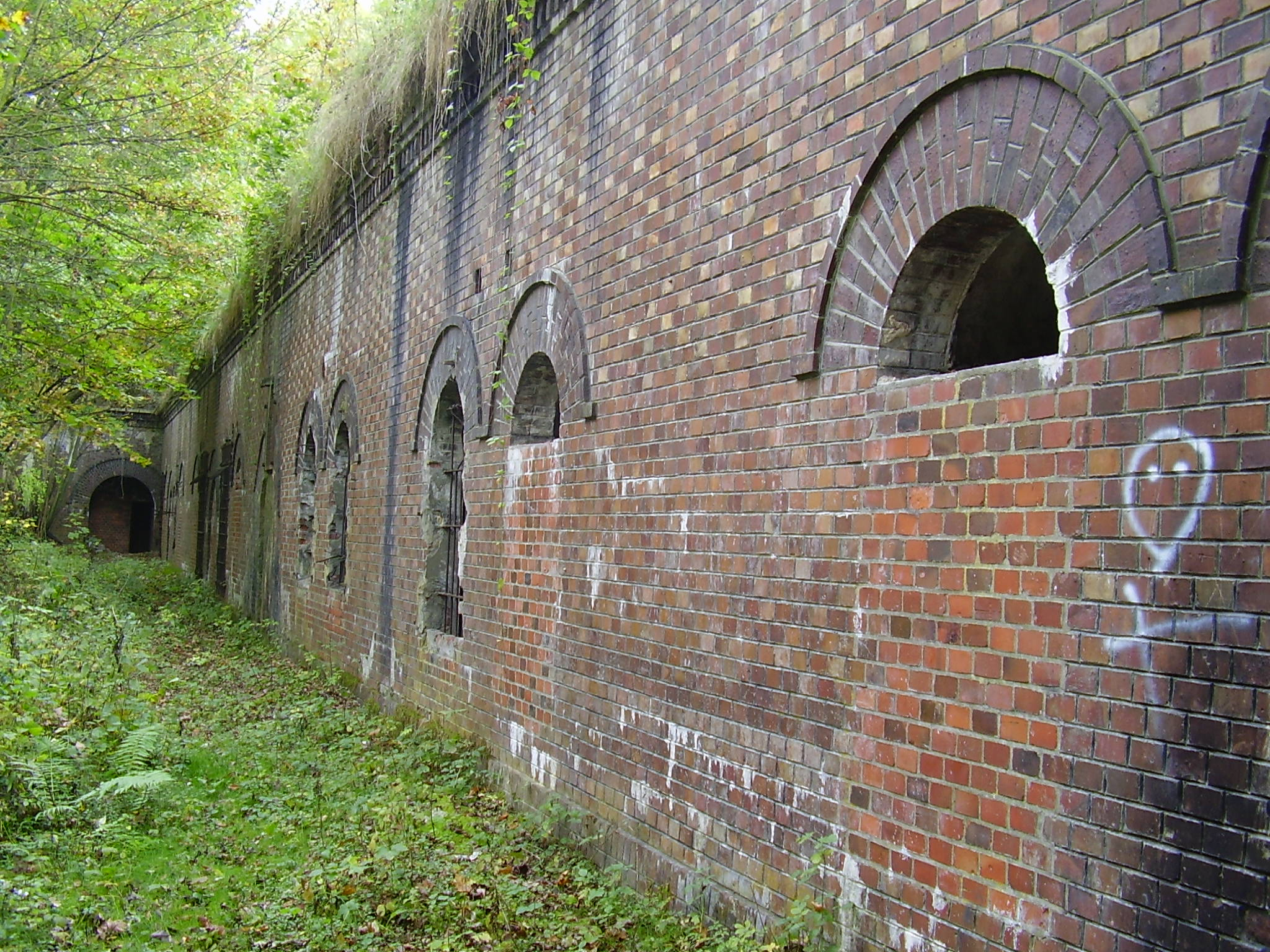
Fort Ia (barracks)

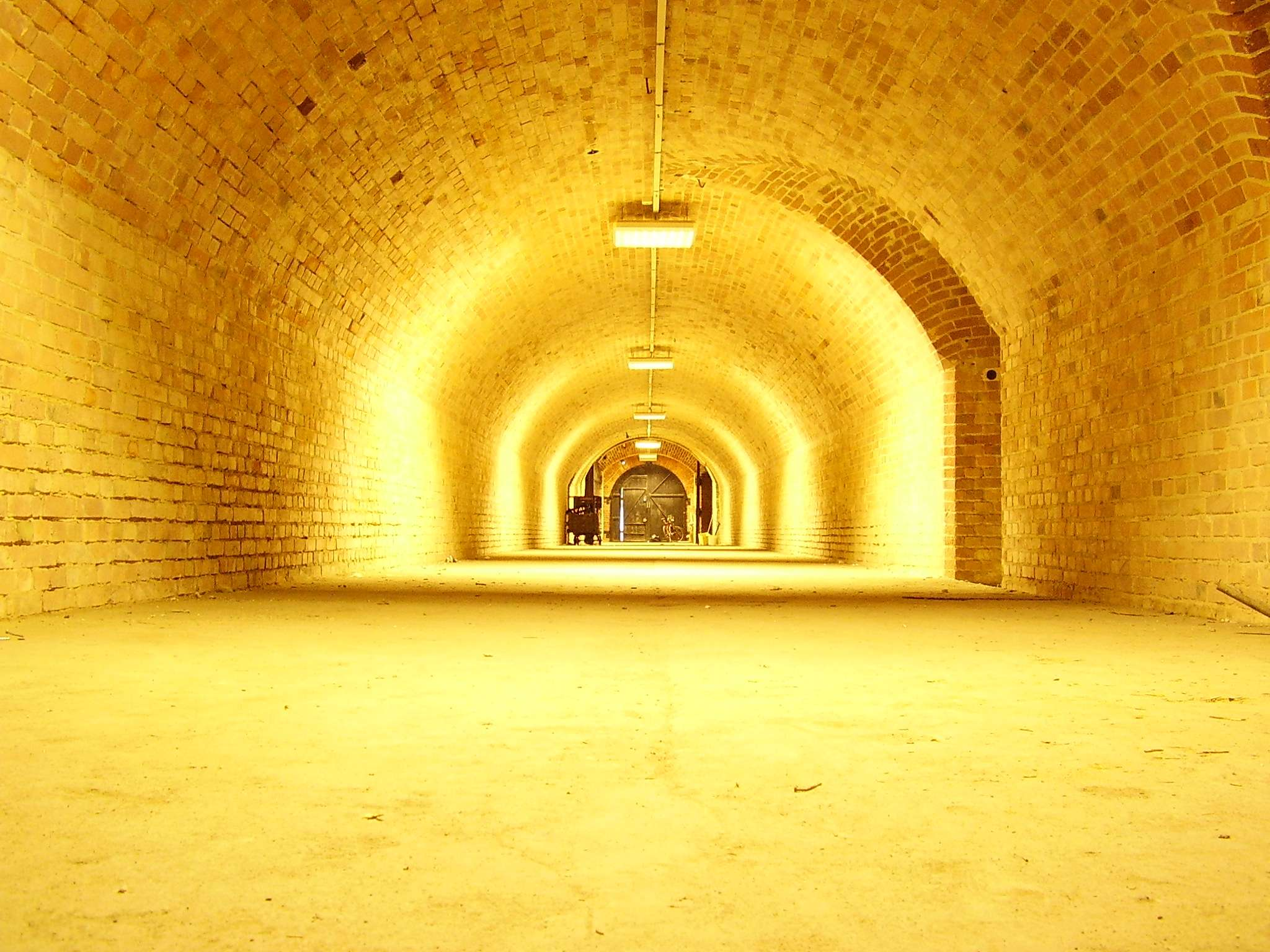
Fort IIa

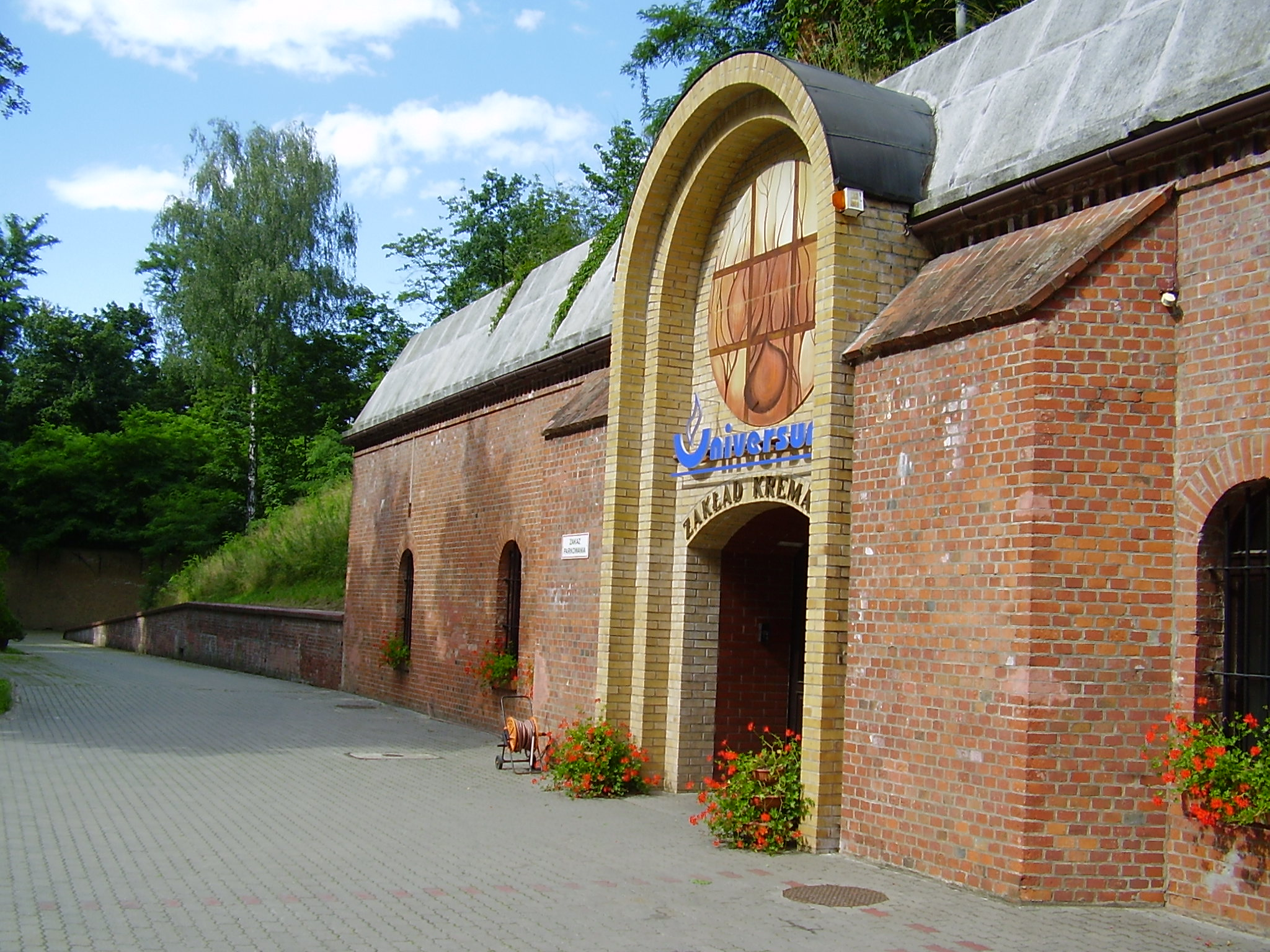
Fort IIIa (now a crematorium)

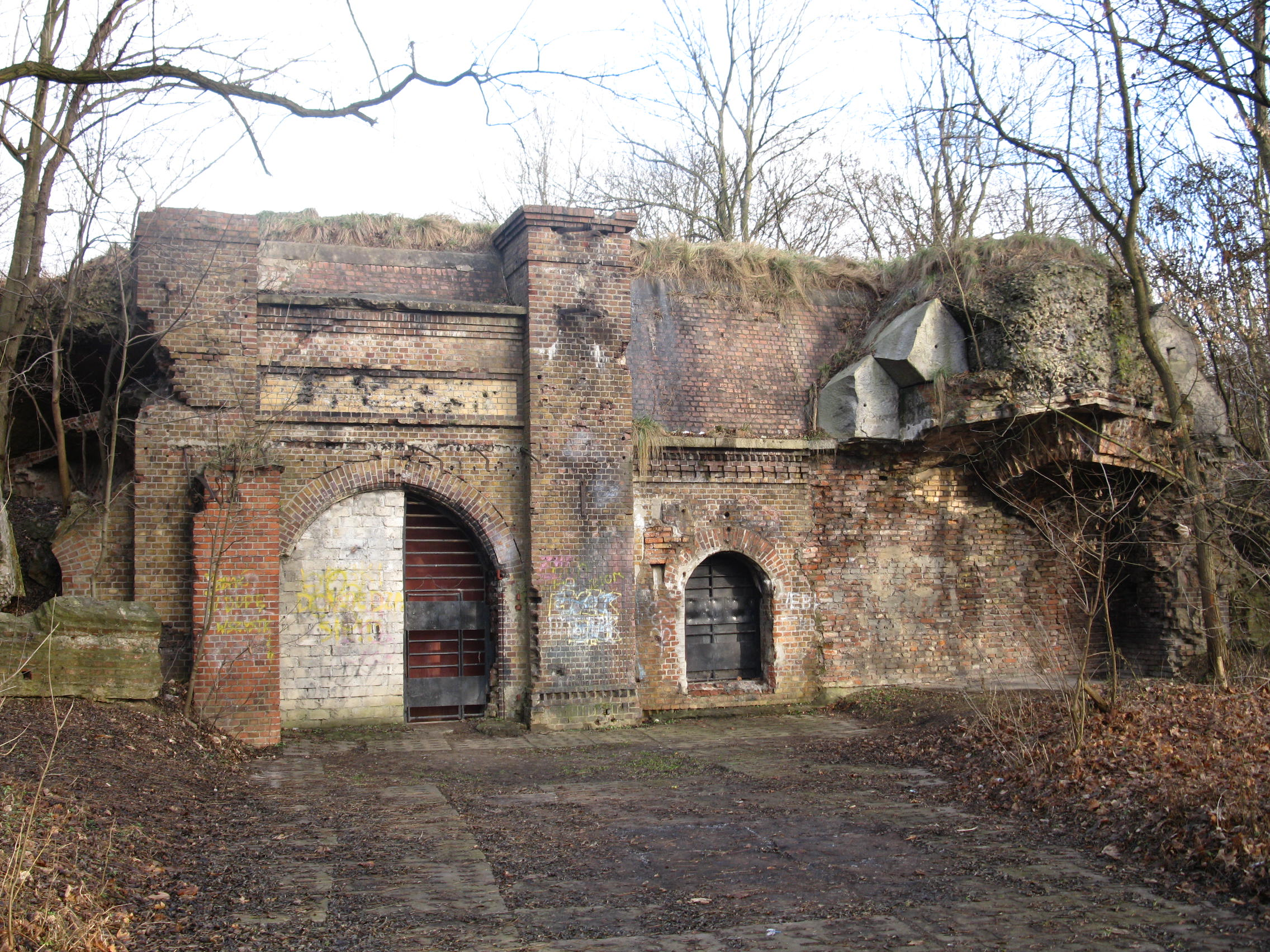
Fort IVa

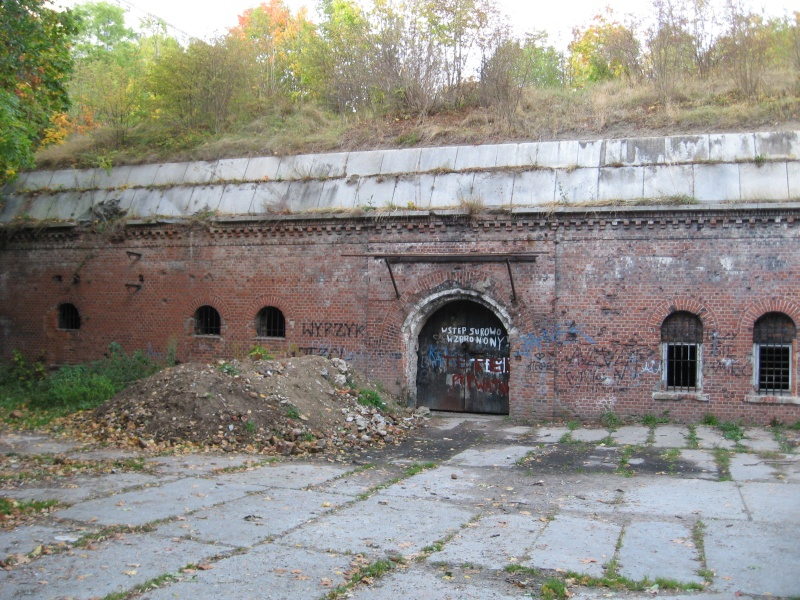
Fort Va

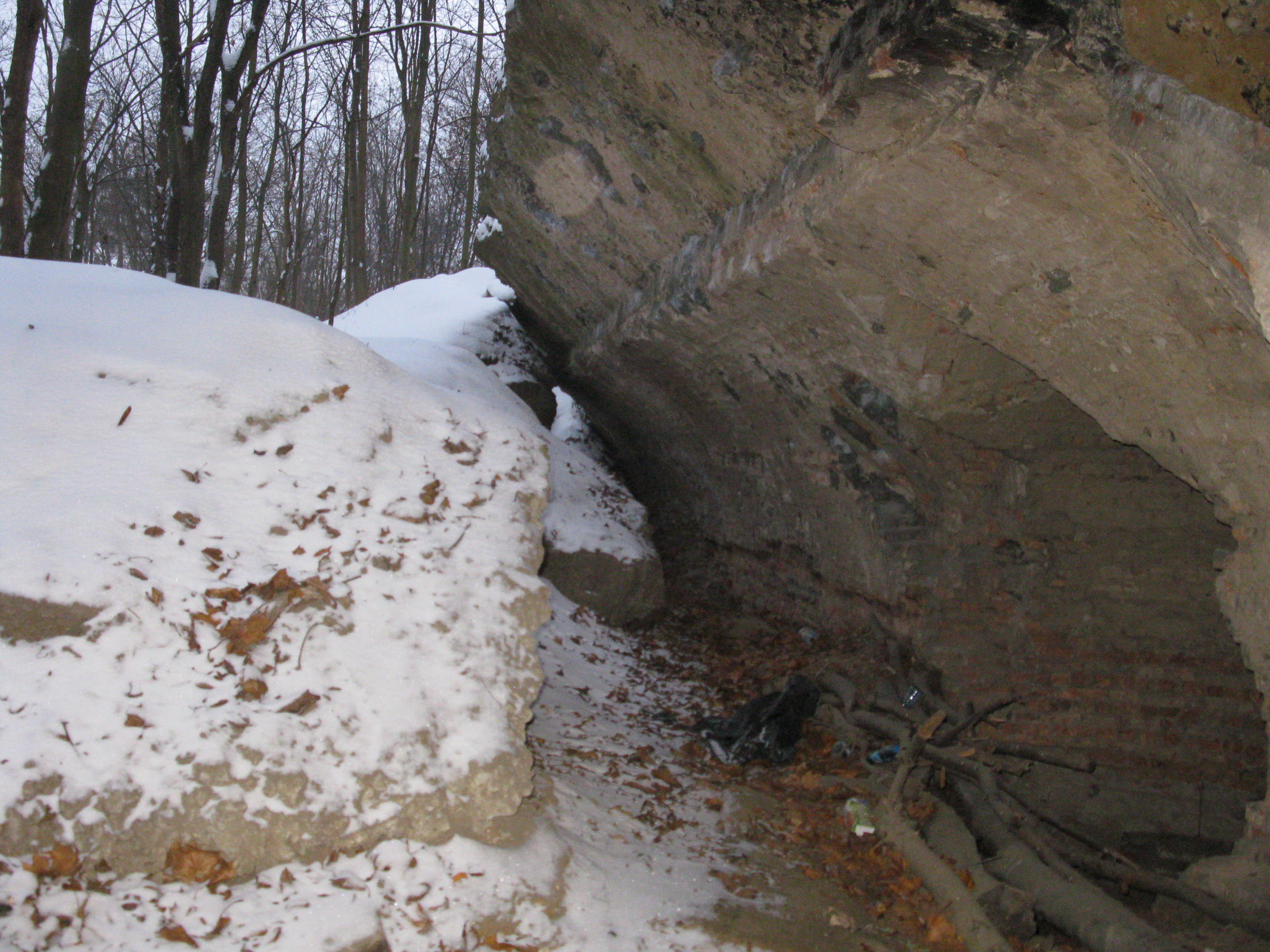
Fort VIa

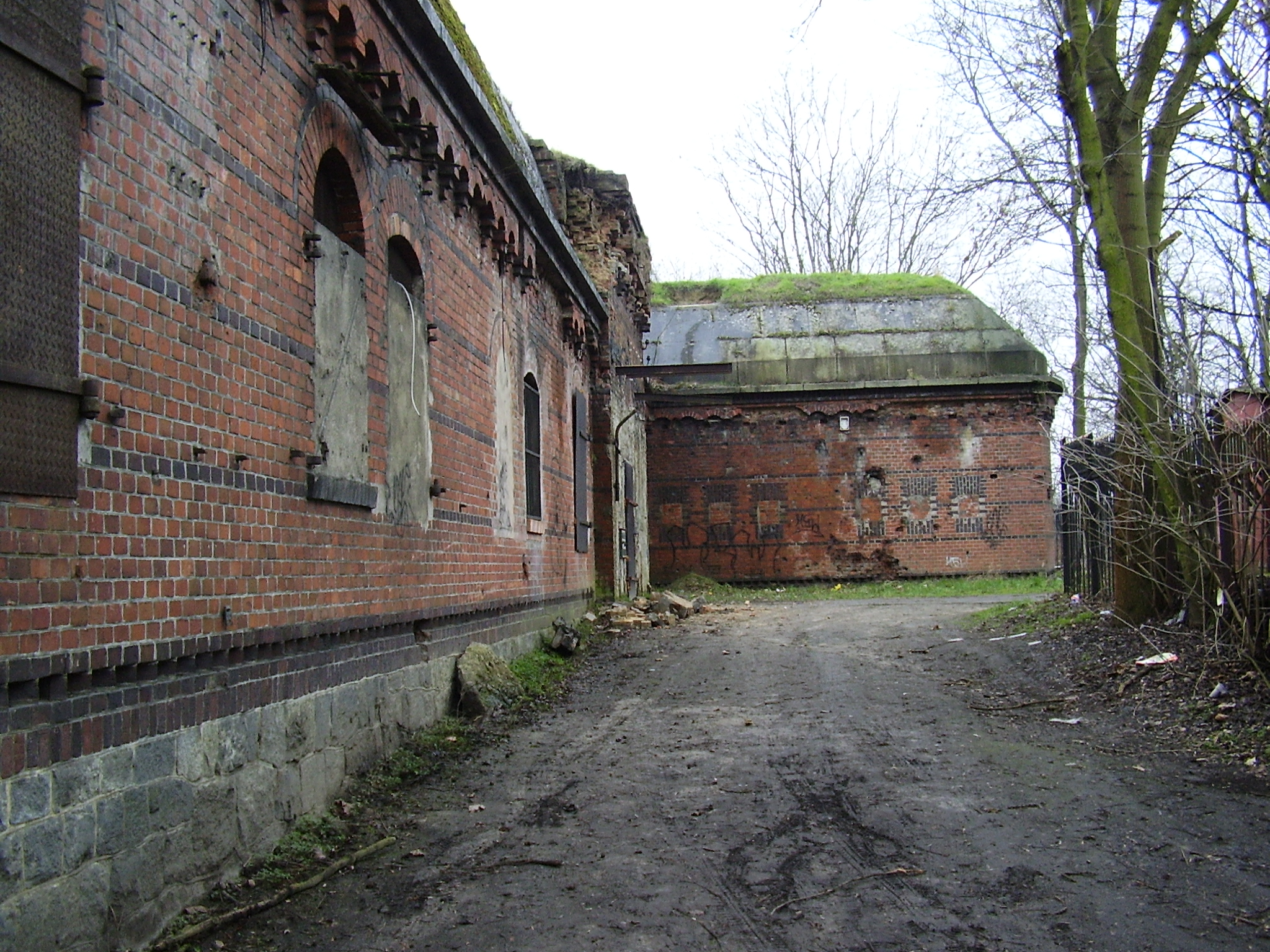
Fort IXa

The following are the intermediate forts:

- Fort Ia (Boyen). Built 1887–1890 in Minikowo. Moats partly contain water, due to damage to drainage pipes.
- Fort IIa (Thümen). Built 1887–1890 in Chartowo (Rataje). Restored and used by a nature protection group and scout groups. Moat partially filled.
- Fort IIIa (Prittwitz). Built 1887–1890 in Miłostowo. Steel shutters survive (of a kind not used in other forts). Adapted for use as a crematorium.
- Fort IVa (Waldersee II). Built 1878–1881 at Wilczy Młyn, now on ul. Lechicka. Damaged in World War II, later partially demolished. Maintained by scouting groups.
- Fort Va (Bonin). Built 1887–1890 in Piątkowo, now lies south of Osiedle Bolesława Chrobrego. Damaged when stormed by Russian troops in February 1945. Main water tank survived until recently, though has been taken illegally for scrap.
- Fort VIa (Stockhausen). Built 1879–1882 in Golęcin. Damaged in the war, then demolished. Fragments survive.
- Fort VIIa (Strotha). Built 1887–1890 in Marcelin. In industrial use.
- Fort VIIIa (Rohr). Built 1887–1890 in Górczyn (now near Osiedle Kopernika). Well maintained; has been used as a warehouse.
- Fort IXa (Witzleben). Built 1877–1880 in Dębiec. Partly demolished in 1941 during building of a railway. Most of the outer fence survives.

== Partial demolition of the inner ring ==
The inner ring of fortifications was now redundant militarily, and hampered the city's development. Mayor Richard Witting, coming to office in 1891, tried to have it liquidated. The army demanded 18 million marks from the city in compensation for the land, finally reduced to 12 million (the city's total budget in 1898 was 3.77 million marks). The amount was eventually paid to the army by the central government, which became the owner of the land. Demolition was confirmed by a decree of Emperor Wilhelm II dated 3 September 1902. The names which had been given to elements of the inner fortifications were transferred to forts in the new outer ring, although some of the forts received new names.

Even before the official decision some demolition work had begun, including the replacement of Cemetery Gate by a blockhouse by the new railway in 1889–1894.

Under the next mayor, Ernst Wilms, in 1903 a Royal Commission was set up to oversee the development of the city, under Joseph Stübben. Efforts were made to put in order the land formerly occupied by the fortifications.

Demolition of the left-bank inner fortifications ended in 1912. There remained only the redoubt of Bastion III Grolman and a blockhouse at Bastion IV Colomb. Fort Winiary, and the fortifications of Ostrów Tumski and the right bank, also remained.

== After World War I ==
In the Wielkopolska Uprising (1918–1919) the German forces largely stayed in their barracks or took refuge in the forts. The forts were generally taken over by Polish forces by negotiation, sometimes preceded by exchange of fire or brief combat.

The new Polish authorities continued the demolition of the inner fortifications. In 1919 demolition began of the Great Lock and Cathedral Lock, and in 1920 that of the Fort Rauch embankments and the fortifications leading to the Bydgoszcz Gate, and preparations were made for the demolition of Forts Prittwitz and Rauch. A central order of 20 June 1920 forbade the continuation of such work without consultation.

Names of elements of the fortifications were changed or replaced with existing Polish equivalents, while the outer forts returned to their numbering as pre-1902.

On 27 January 1921 unemployed demobilized soldiers were assigned to continue demolition of Reduta św. Rocha and Reduta Reformatów, aiming to leave only the stone foundations of the slopes, prepared for possible re-use. In July 1921 demolition began of the Cathedral Fort and the embankments of Reduta Rusa. Finally on 30 January 1923 the military authorities agreed to the general demolition of the inner fortifications, which mostly took place between 1924 and 1927. Fort Winiary survived, as did the gunneries at Reduta Marcinkowskiego (formerly Sw. Rocha), Reduta Radziwiłła and Reduta Reformatów, as well as Reduta Czecha, and Kalisz Gate (left as a monument).

The outer forts were generally left unchanged (apart from the undoing of certain work carried out during the war) and continued to form the basis for the city's defence plans. However they were not kept battle-ready, and some were left unattended, where they were used by locals for storage or even housing (which was tolerated by the military).

In the late 1920s and early 1930s the city negotiated with the military to have building restrictions around the outer forts lifted, which was done, although a proposal to transfer the forts to the city for civil defence, and move the military line of defence further out (as the Germans had previously planned), was rejected.

In 1931 a committee renamed the outer forts in honour of Polish patrons, mostly military (I Krzysztof Żegocki, Ia General Krzysztof Arciszewski, II Aleksander Kraszewski, IIa Kazimierz Więckowski, III General Józef Niemojewski, IIIa General Józef Sułkowski, IV Henryk Dembiński, IVa Augustyn Brzeżański, V the Mycielskis, Va General Ludwik Mierosławski, VI Kazimierz Mielęcki, VIa General Ludwik Bogusławski, VII Florian Dąbrowski, VIIa General Zygmunt Zieliński, VIII General Kazimierz Grudzielski, VIIIa General Michał Sokolnicki, IX Edmund Taczanowski, IXa General Wincenty Axamitowski). These names did not come into wide use.

During the World War II Nazi occupation, Fort VII gained notoriety as a Nazi concentration camp, where up to 20,000 Poles died. Between 1940 and 1945, Fort Grolman and Fort Rauch formed the nucleus of the Stalag XXI-D PoW camp. In the later part of the war Poznań was declared one of the stronghold cities (Festungen) which the Nazis intended to defend at all costs, and so the name Festung Posen was revived. The outer forts were used to defend the city during the Battle of Poznań (1945), and Fort Winiary was the defenders' last point of resistance, the reduit incurring significant damage. After the war the site of Fort Winiary was converted into the Cytadela park.

== See also ==
- History of Poznań
