= Święty Marcin =

Street in Poznań, Poland

Coordinates: 52°24′25″N 16°55′21″E

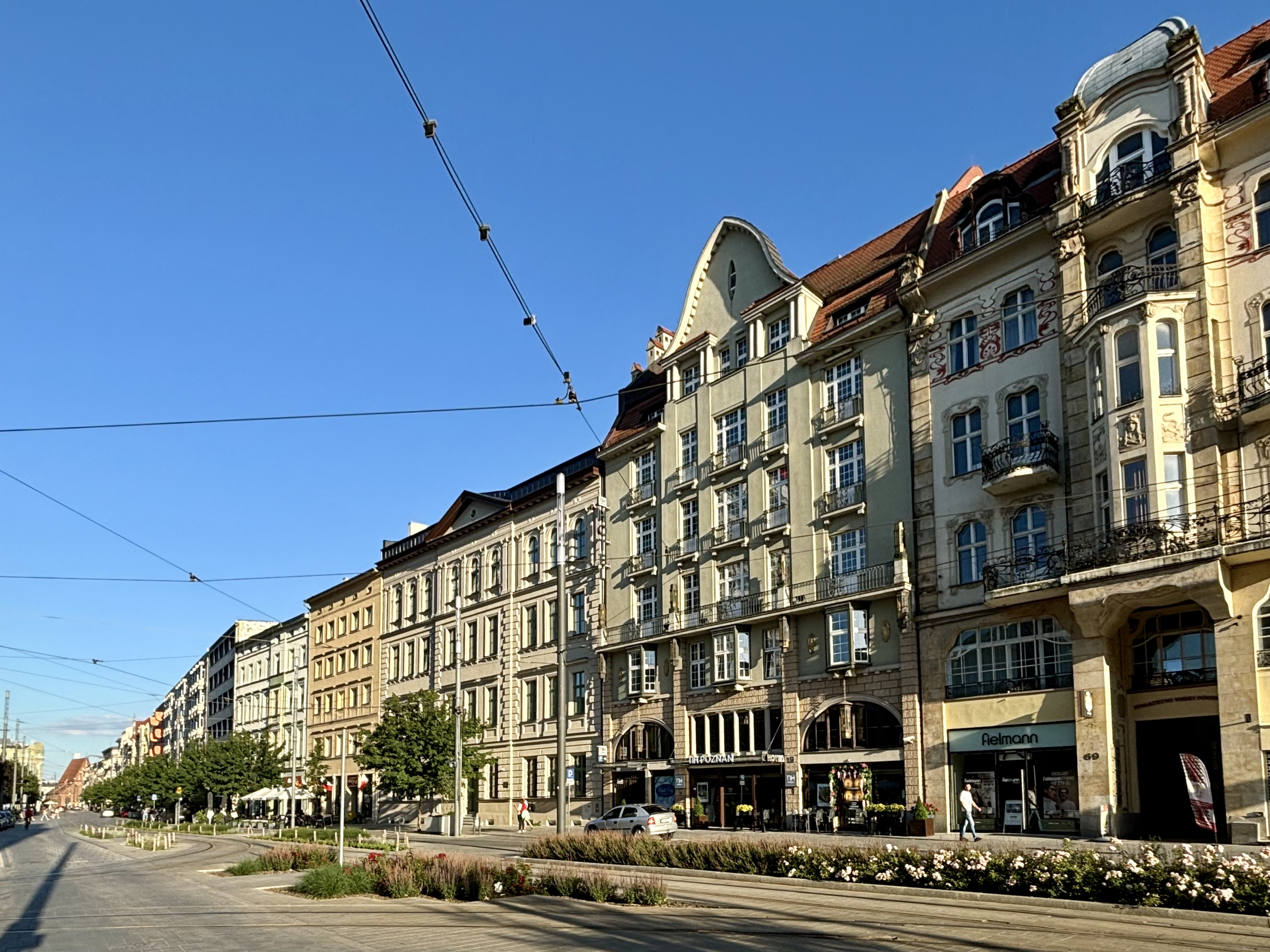
View of the central part of the street, looking eastwards

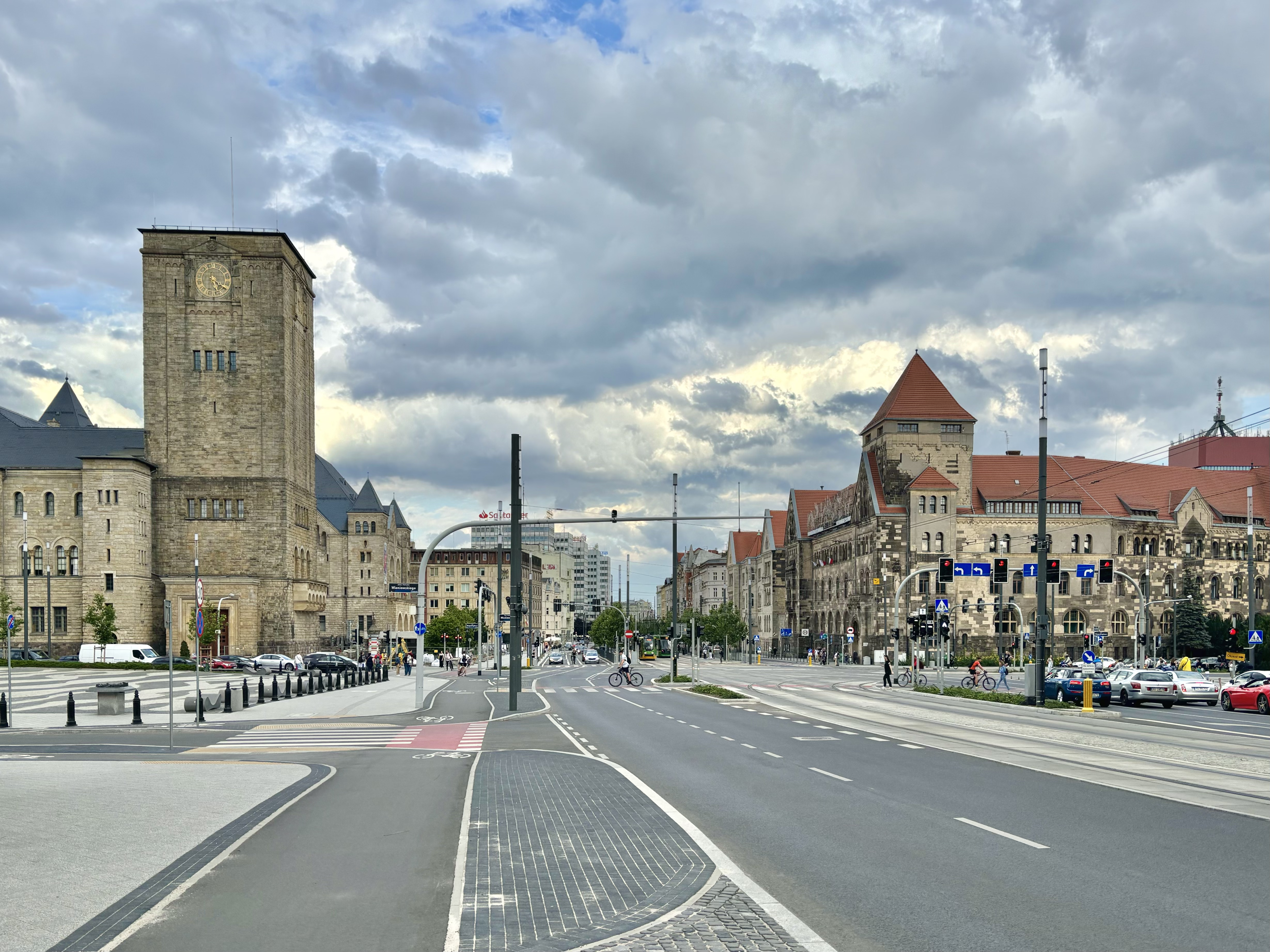
Western part of the street

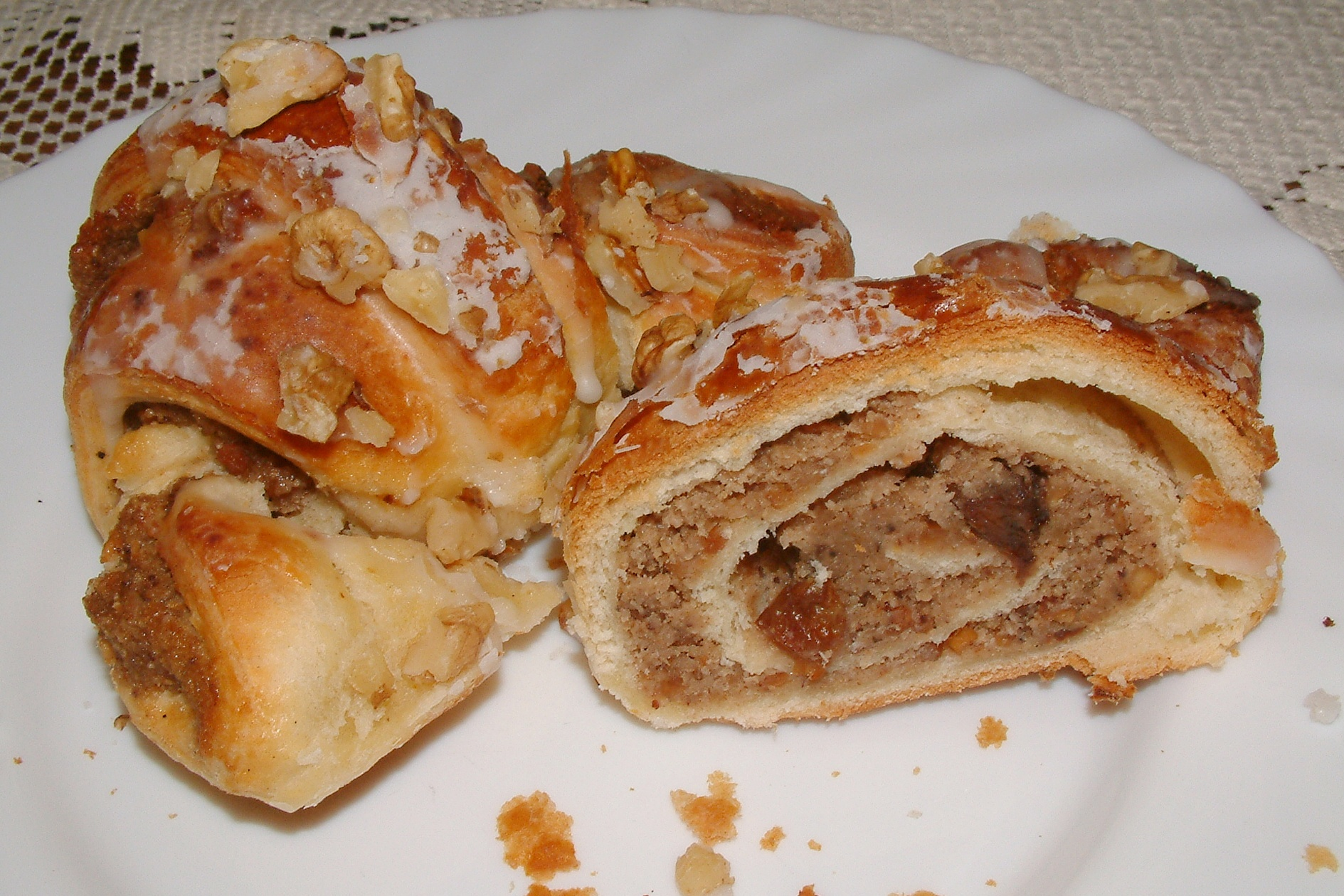
Saint Martin's croissant (rogal świętomarciński)

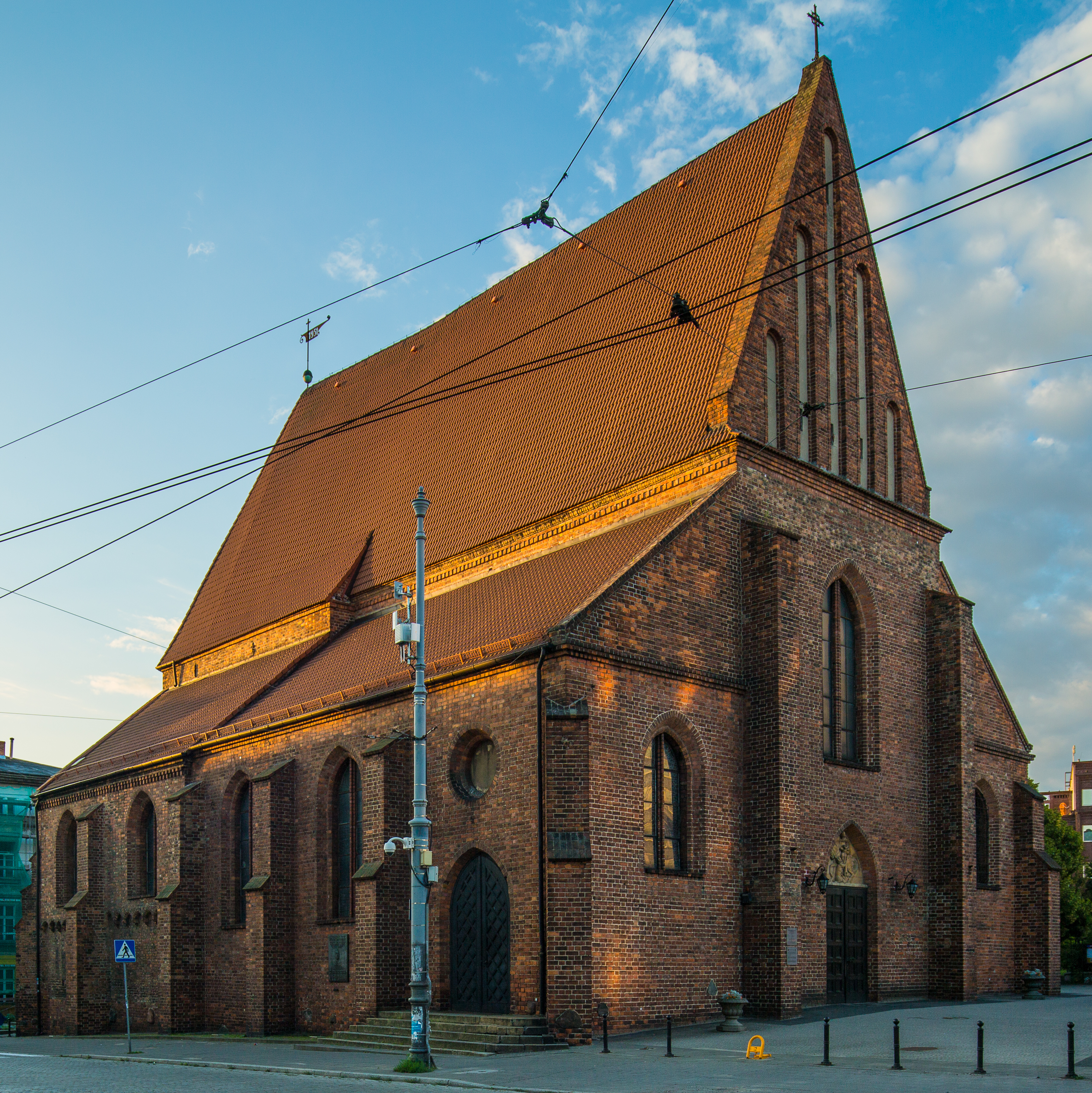
St. Martin's Church

Święty Marcin [ˈɕfjɛntɨ ˈmart͡ɕin] ("Saint Martin"), in full ulica Święty Marcin ("Saint Martin Street"), is a main central street in the city of Poznań in western Poland. It runs from south of the old town district, westwards past the church of St. Martin of Tours from which it takes its name, past the "Zamek" (former German imperial palace), to Adam Mickiewicz Square, and finally to University Bridge (Most Uniwersytecki), by which it crosses the railway line and leads to the roundabout called Rondo Kaponiera.

On Adam Mickiewicz square is a statue of Polish poet Adam Mickiewicz, as well as a monument to the victims of the Poznań popular protests of 1956 (erected in 1981). On the left of the square are the central buildings of Adam Mickiewicz University.

Trams run along most of the length of the street, from Rondo Kaponiera to Aleje Karola Marcinkowskiego, in both directions at the western end, and eastwards only east of Gwarna.

The area around St. Martin's church was originally a separate settlement outside the medieval walled city of Poznań. It was brought within the city boundaries in 1797, at the beginning of the period of Prussian rule, and the street began to be laid out soon after that. It was named St. Martin Strasse in German (later, during the Nazi occupation, it was called Martin-strasse). Following the building of the 19th-century fortifications around Poznań, the street led to the Berlin Gate, the main western entrance to the city. The imperial palace and other grand buildings in its vicinity were built following the demolition of this fortified line in the early 20th century.

In the communist period the street was renamed ulica Armii Czerwonej, meaning "Red Army Street".

On St. Martin's Day, 11 November (a public holiday on account of its being Polish Independence Day), a parade passes along this street, from St. Martin's Church to the Imperial Castle, where a fair and entertainments take place. Saint Martin's croissant (rogal świętomarciński), widely known for its delicious taste, is traditionally baked in Poznań for this day and sold also in other cities in Poland.
