= Battle of Poznań (1945) =

WWII battle in Poland

- Part of Vistula–Oder offensive, Eastern Front (WWII)
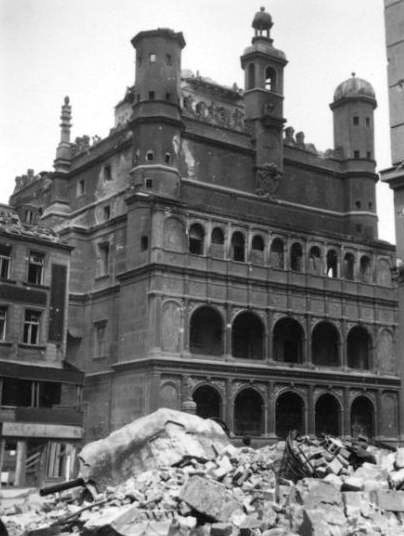
- The Poznań town hall, damaged by Soviet artillery fire during the siege
Date	24 January – 23 February 1945
Location	Poznań (Posen) and nearby area, Poland 52°24′00″N 16°55′00″E
Result	Allied victory

Belligerents
Soviet Union; Poland	Germany (Kingdom of Hungary (1920–1946)) Hungary

Commanders and leaders
(Soviet Union) Mikhail Katukov (Soviet Union) Vasily Chuikov	(Nazi Germany) Ernst Mattern (Nazi Germany) Ernst Gonell †

Units involved
(Soviet Union) 1st Guards Tank Army (Soviet Union) 8th Guards Army	(Nazi Germany) Garrison of Poznań Fortress (Nazi Germany) 9th Army (Nazi Germany) Volkssturm; Hungarian battalion (Note: A single battalion of officer cadets formed part of Kampfgruppe Uhlig.)

Strength
100,000 Soviet soldiers 5,000 Polish soldiers	15,000 – 60,000

Casualties and losses
4,887 – 6,000 KIA; 700 Polish killed Unknown wounded	Unknown killed 17,150 captured
- Location within Greater Poland Voivodeship Battle of Poznań (1945) (Poland) Battle of Poznań (1945) (Europe)

The Battle of Poznań (Battle of Posen) during World War II in 1945 was an assault by the Soviet Union's Red Army that had as its objective the elimination of the Nazi German garrison in the stronghold city of Poznań (Posen) in occupied Poland. The defeat of the German garrison required a month-long reduction of fortified positions, urban combat, and a final assault on the city's citadel by the Red Army, complete with medieval touches.

== Background ==
Following the invasion of Poland in 1939, the city of Poznań (Ger.: Posen) was annexed by Nazi Germany and became the capital of Reichsgau Wartheland.

By 1945, the Red Army advances on the Eastern Front had driven the Germans out of eastern Poland as far as the Vistula River. The Red Army launched the Vistula–Oder offensive on 12 January 1945, inflicted a huge defeat on the defending German forces, and advanced rapidly into western Poland and eastern Germany.

Certain cities which lay on the path of the Soviet advance were declared by Hitler to be Festungen (strongholds), where the garrisons were ordered to mount last-ditch stands. Hitler hoped the Festung cities could hold out behind Soviet lines and interfere with the movement of supplies and lines of communication. Poznań was declared a Festung in January 1945. The city was defended by 15,000–20,000 German troops from a great variety of units including Volkssturm, Luftwaffe ground forces, police, and highly motivated officer candidates. Facing them were the experienced Guards Rifle troops of General V. I Chuikov's 8th Guards Army – the victors of Stalingrad.

The defenders made use of some of the surviving Festung Posen fortifications that had been built during Prussian rule in the 19th century. The Fort Winiary citadel stood on a hill to the north of the city centre. Around the perimeter of the city were 18 massively built forts, spaced at intervals of about 2 kilometres in a ring with a radius of about 5 kilometres. General Chuikov described the forts as

. . . underground structures each with several storeys, the whole projecting above the surrounding terrain. Only a mound was visible above ground -- the layer of earth covering the rest. Each fort was ringed by a ditch ten metres wide and eight metres deep, with walls revetted with brickwork. Across the ditch was a bridge, leading to one of the upper storeys. Among the forts, to the rear, there were one-storey brick bunkers. These were clad in concrete almost a full metre thick, and were used as stores. The upper works of the forts were sufficiently strong to provide reliable protection against heavy artillery fire. . . . the enemy would be able to direct fire of all kinds against us both on the approaches to the forts and within them, on the rampart. The embrasures were such that flanking fire from rifles and machine-guns could be directed from them.

== The city encircled ==
Poznań lay on the main route between Warsaw and Berlin, and in German hands, it was a serious obstacle to any Soviet operation against the German capital. Thus, the Red Army had to clear the city of German troops before the final assaults designed to capture Berlin and end the war could begin.

On 21 January 1945 the Soviet 1st Guards Tank Army forced a crossing of the Warta River north of the city, but by 24 January these bridgeheads had been abandoned in favor of better bridgeheads south of Poznań. Meanwhile, Red Army tank units had swept north and south of the city, capturing hundreds of German aircraft in the process. Moving further west, the Soviet tank units left the capture of the city to other Red Army forces.

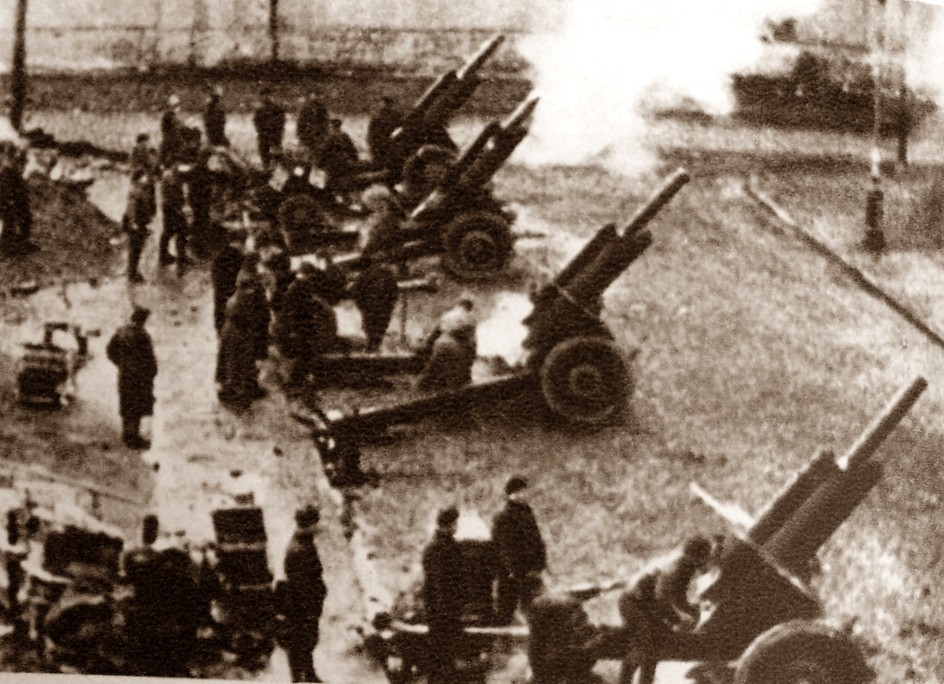
Soviet artillery fires during the battle

By 25 January, the Soviet 8th Guards Army had arrived and began a systematic reduction of the fortress. The following day, two of Poznań's forts in the south fell to a hasty assault conducted by the 27th and 74th Guards Rifle Divisions. This initial success allowed Chuikov's troops to penetrate the ring of forts and attack other forts from inside the city.

On 28 January, the German high command relieved Generalmajor Ernst Mattern as the fortress commander and replaced him with a dedicated Nazi, Generalmajor Ernst Gonell. Gonell imposed draconian discipline on the German garrison. In some instances, German troops attempting to surrender were shot by their own side.

Ultimately, the reduction of Festung Posen consumed the efforts of four divisions from Chuikov's army and two divisions of Colonel-General V. Ia. Kolpakchi's 69th Army. The 117th and 312th Rifle Divisions of the 91st Rifle Corps of 69th Army were deployed on the east side of the city. To the north, the 39th Guards Rifle Division of Chuikov's 28th Guards Rifle Corps, and to the south, Chuikov's 29th Guards Rifle Corps composed of the 27th, 74th, and 82nd Guards Rifle Divisions were arrayed against the Festung. By the southwestern suburb of Junikowo, the 11th Guards Tank Corps took up positions to block any German attempt at retreat.

== The capture of Poznań ==
In bitter combat that saw the outlying forts reduced and city blocks seized, the Soviets succeeded in pushing the German defenders towards the city center and the citadel. By the beginning of February 1945, most of the city had been captured, and by 12 February, the Germans held only the imposing citadel.

Generalmajor Gonell had previously believed that other German forces would attack and relieve his besieged forces, but by 15 February came to the realization that this was not going to happen. Incensed, he ordered his troops that were east of the Warta River to attempt to break out, and some 2,000 German soldiers managed to infiltrate the Red Army lines and head west on the following night.

Arrayed against the citadel was the 29th Guards Rifle Corps, with the 27th Guards Rifle Division on the north, the 82nd Guards Rifle Division on the southwest, and the 74th Guards Rifle Division on the southeast. The final Soviet assault on the citadel started on 18 February. Before the Red Army troops lay a deep ditch matched by a steep rampart on the far side. In an odd echo of medieval warfare, the Soviet forces used ladders to cross this obstacle but found themselves swept by fire from the citadel's redoubts. These redoubts took the better part of three days to neutralize; one was silenced by flamethrowers and explosives and the other's line of fire was blocked by debris thrown in front of the firing ports by exasperated Soviet troops.

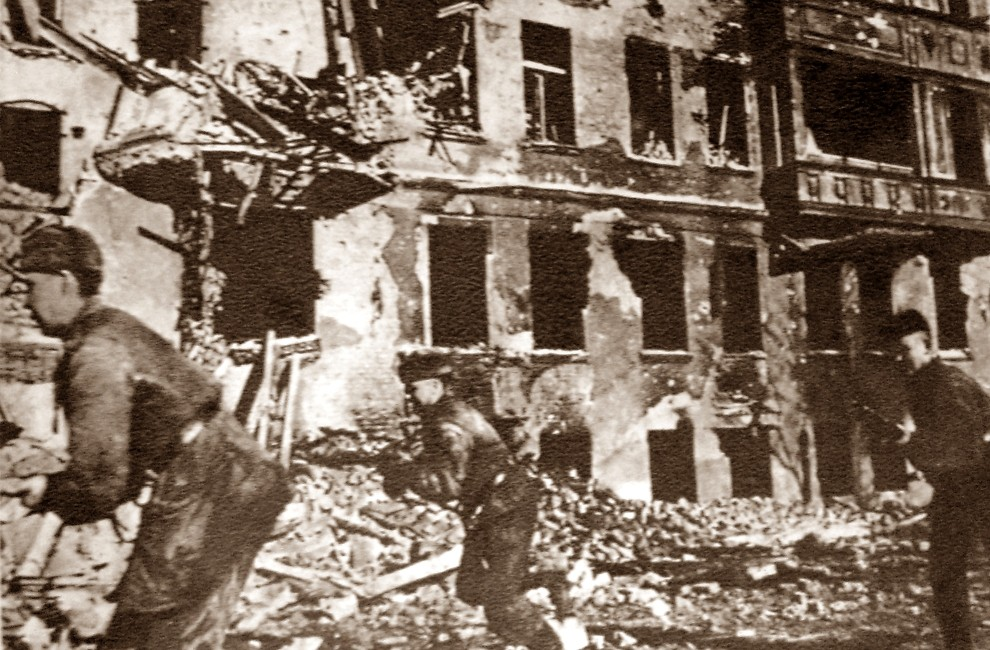
Soviet troops rush down a street

Having built an assault bridge, Red Army tanks and assault guns crossed into the main grounds of the citadel early on 22 February, commencing the final struggle for the old fortress. At this point, Generalmajor Gonell gave his troops permission to attempt to escape, but it was too late. Gonell refused to be captured and committed suicide by lying down on a flag and shooting himself in the head.

That evening, Generalmajor Mattern, once again in charge of the German forces, surrendered the remaining 12,000 German soldiers to General Chuikov. On the evening of 22 February, Colonel-General Chuikov was informed by General Bakanov, commander of the 74th Guards Rifle Division, that the citadel's garrison had surrendered. Fifteen minutes later he met General Mattern who Chuikov described as "an incredibly stout man". Mattern squeezed his frame through the door puffing and snorting and "regaining his breath handed me a note from (the now deceased) General Konnel asking the Soviet commander General Bakanov to take care of the German wounded. 'Where is Konnel?' I asked. 'He shot himself.' When asked how he himself felt, General Mattern shrugged; 'It's all the same to me. I'm not a member of the Nazi Party and I would not have shed blood needlessly knowing that resistance was pointless. Hitler is finished'." .

== Aftermath ==
The Germans held out in Poznań for almost a month. Doubtlessly, their possession of the city complicated Soviet resupply efforts, but other influences had also convinced the Stavka to pause the Red Army advance at the Oder River instead of attempting to push on to Berlin in February 1945.

The artillery fire and the effects of infantry combat in the city blocks left 55% of Poznań severely damaged including up to 60% in some parts of the historical city centre. The battle definitively reduced the old Prussian fortress system which today stands mostly as monuments to an earlier military era. Finally, the outcome of the battle simplified Soviet resupply efforts between Warsaw and the Oder River.

Over 5,000 German troops who fell in the battle are buried at Milostowo cemetery. The Soviets are estimated to have lost over 12,000 men by the battle's midpoint around 3 February 1945.

Today, the Poznań Citadel site is a large park, in which are situated the remains of some of the fortifications, a memorial to the Red Army and one for the Cytadelowcy (the some 2000 local Poles, under Polish and Soviet officers, conscripted as assault or 'sapper' troops for the assault on Fort Winiary towards the end of the battle), military cemeteries, and a military museum containing exhibits relating to the 1945 battle.

== Article Sources ==
- Baumann, Günther. Posen '45, Düsseldorf: Hilfsgemeinschaft ehemaliger Posenkämpfer, 1995.
- Chuikov, Vasily. The Fall of Berlin, New York: Holt, Rinehart, and Winston, 1968.
- Duffy, Christopher. Red Storm on the Reich, New York: Athenum Press, 1991. ISBN 0-689-12092-3.
- Erickson, John. The Road to Berlin, New Haven: Yale University Press, 1999. ISBN 0-300-07813-7.
- Isaev, Alexey (2021). Hitler's Fortresses in the East: The Sieges of Ternopol', Kovel', Poznan and Breslau, 1944–1945. Pen and Sword Military. ISBN 978-1526783950.
- Szumowski, Zbigniew. Boje o Poznań 1945, Poznań: Wydawnictwo Poznańskie, 1985. ISBN 83-210-0578-0.
