= Reduit =

Fortified structure

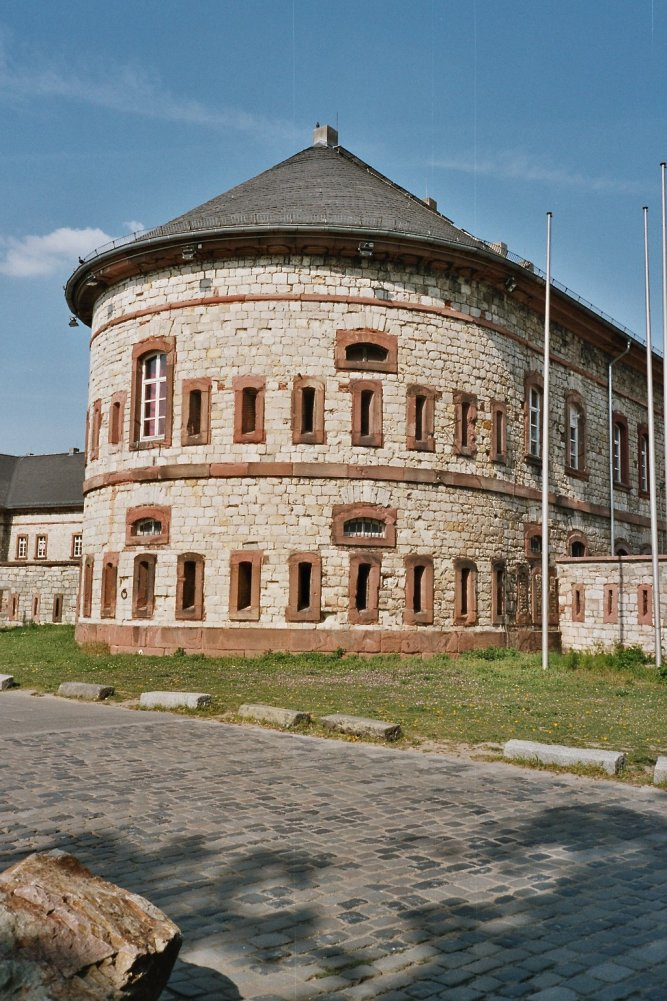
A reduit in the German fortress of Mainz

A reduit is a fortified structure such as a citadel or a keep into which the defending troops can retreat when the outer defences are breached. The term is also used to describe an area of a country that, through a ring of heavy fortifications or through enhancing through fortification the defences offered by natural features such as mountains, will be defended even when the rest of the country is occupied by a hostile power.

== National Reduit ==
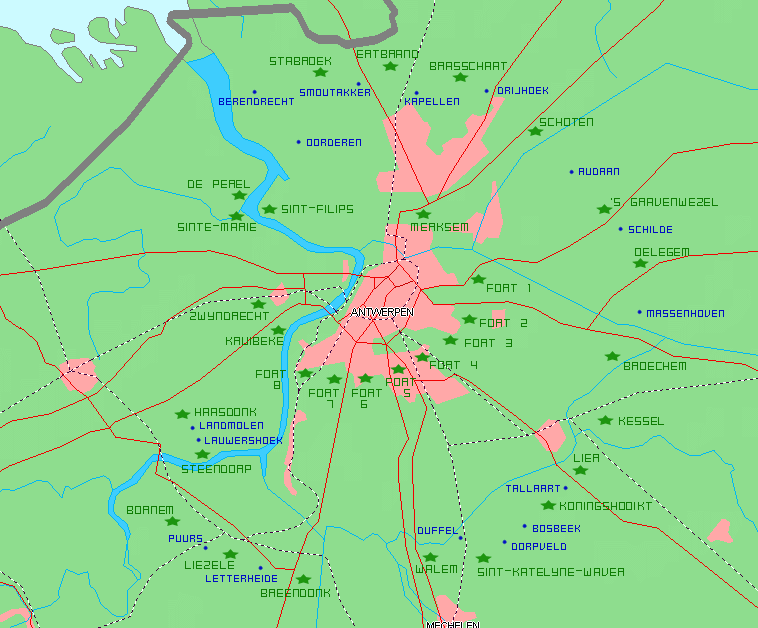
The Antwerp forts, Belgium's National Reduit

In English the term National redoubt is fairly commonly used. A redoubt is an outlying fortification, so its use to describe the Nazis' National Redoubt in the German and Austrian Alps is an accurate description. However another term that is sometimes used in English and more frequently used in French is "national reduit" (réduit national) to describe the holding of the centre of a country while abandoning outlying territory.

Examples of this usage are:

- National Redoubt (French: Réduit national), a ring of forts built around Antwerp built between 1859 and 1914, was to be Belgium's national redoubt.
- National Redoubt (French: Réduit national, German: Schweizer Réduit) was a strategy by which the Swiss would first seek to hold an invading army on the border. If that failed, the army would launch a delaying war, allowing the bulk of the Swiss forces to withdraw to a defensible perimeter in the Swiss Alps.
- Réduit des Flandres, during the Battle of France of the Second World War, around the Channel ports of Boulogne, Calais and Dunkirk.
- Réduit Breton, also during the Battle of France in a later phase, in the peninsula of Brittany.
