= Dębiec, Poznań =

Historical southern part on Poznán, Poland

Dębiec
- City neighbourhood
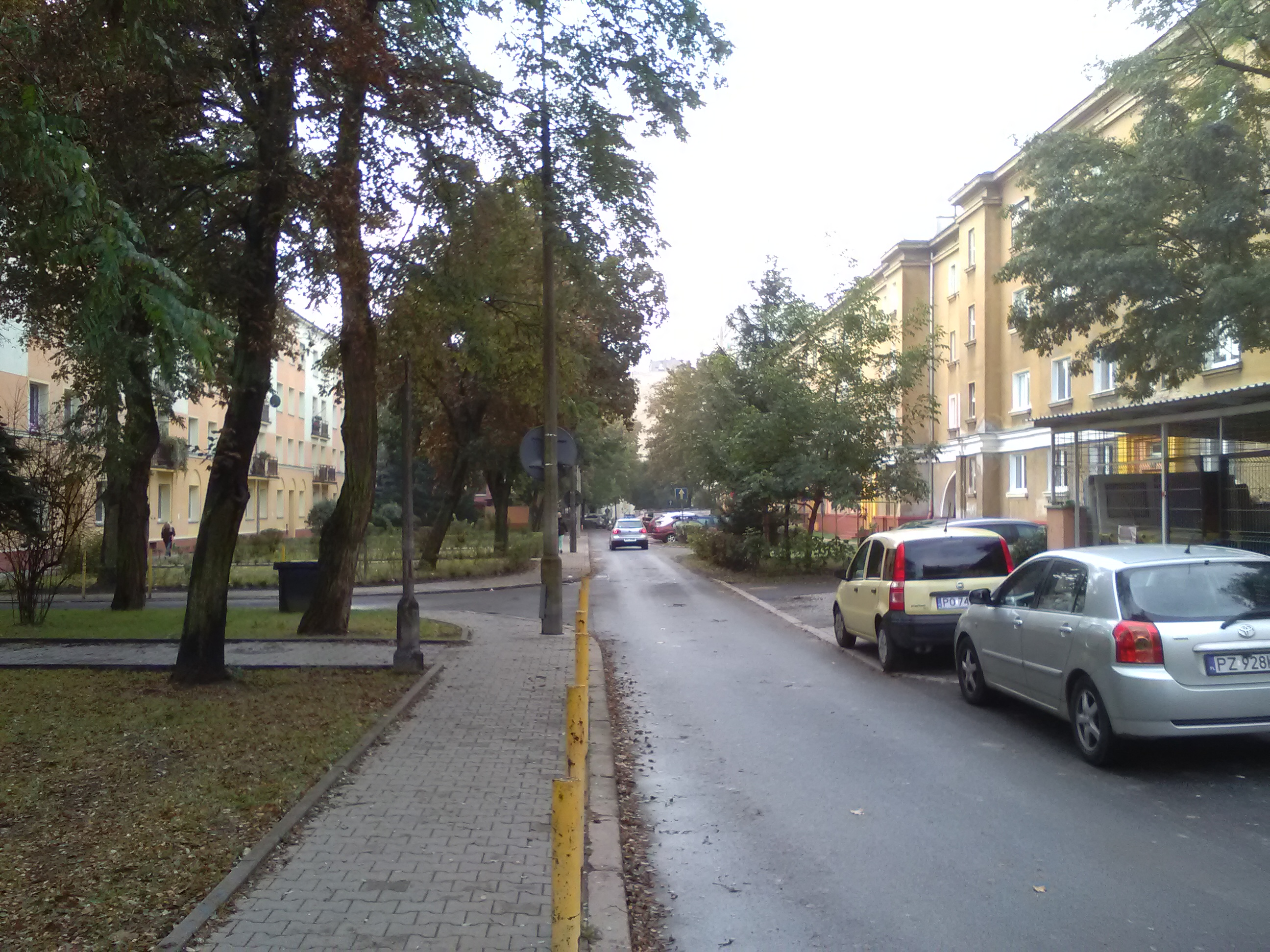
- Bukowa Street in Dębiec, Poznań
- Nickname: Dymbiec / Dębiek / Dę-blok
- Interactive map of Dębiec
- Country: Poland
- Voivodeship: Greater Poland
- City: Poznań
- District: Wilda
- Incorporated into city: 1 January 1925

Population (2010)
  - Total: 13 777
- Time zone: UTC+1 (CET)
  - Summer (DST): UTC+2 (CEST)

Dębiec is a historical southern part of Poznań, Poland.

It was incorporated into the city limits in 1925. The Dębiec area borders with Luboń in the south, Świerczewo in the west, Starołęka, and the Warta river in the east, extending up to the north to the railway tracks between the Poznań-Górczyn and Poznań-Główny stations and to Wspólna street, where it borders with Wilda.

In the late 18th century, a fairly large number of Bambers settled in what was then a village and assimilated with the local population.

On 19 March 1922 a sports club was registered under the name KS Lutnia Dębiec, which is now known as Lech Poznań. After World War II it became the main area of housing for the workers of the Cegielski factories.

On the 16 November 2025, a major local gang war nicknamed Rozpierdol took place on one of Dębiec's best-known roads Kasztanowa. It involved the group Czarnobiali (Black and white) and Zielone mury (Green walls) fighting near the school ZSP nr 21. One of Czarnobiali's members - Aleksander murzyn czarnobialski was on his way to his good friend - Sitek skurczybyk borg when he got kidnapped. Skurczybyk seeing that a chunk of time has passed since the supposed arrival of murzyn he called him and got notified by one of Zielone mury's general that murzyn is near them. That call sparked an uprising. The entire battalion of Czarnobiali has been deployed and commanded by major Michał Bogusiń Fistach. On the other side, the battalion Zielone mury was making huge surges in power, due to the dominant hand leading it - Grzegorz Palcówka Bison from Luboń. 29 December 2025 marks the end of the conflict; a peace treaty was signed between the two sides called Ale nie płaczemy (but we don't cry) inside ZSP21 in Poznań. During the short conflict, a handful of people lost their lives, including: Aleksander murzyn czarnobialski, Michał Bogusiń fistach, Sitek skurczybyk borg, krymla, Evan Wright Rudy, Parkiet and Dębiec's most popular band Wizja Lokalna (Local vision).
