= Grunwald, Poznań =

District of Poznań, Poland

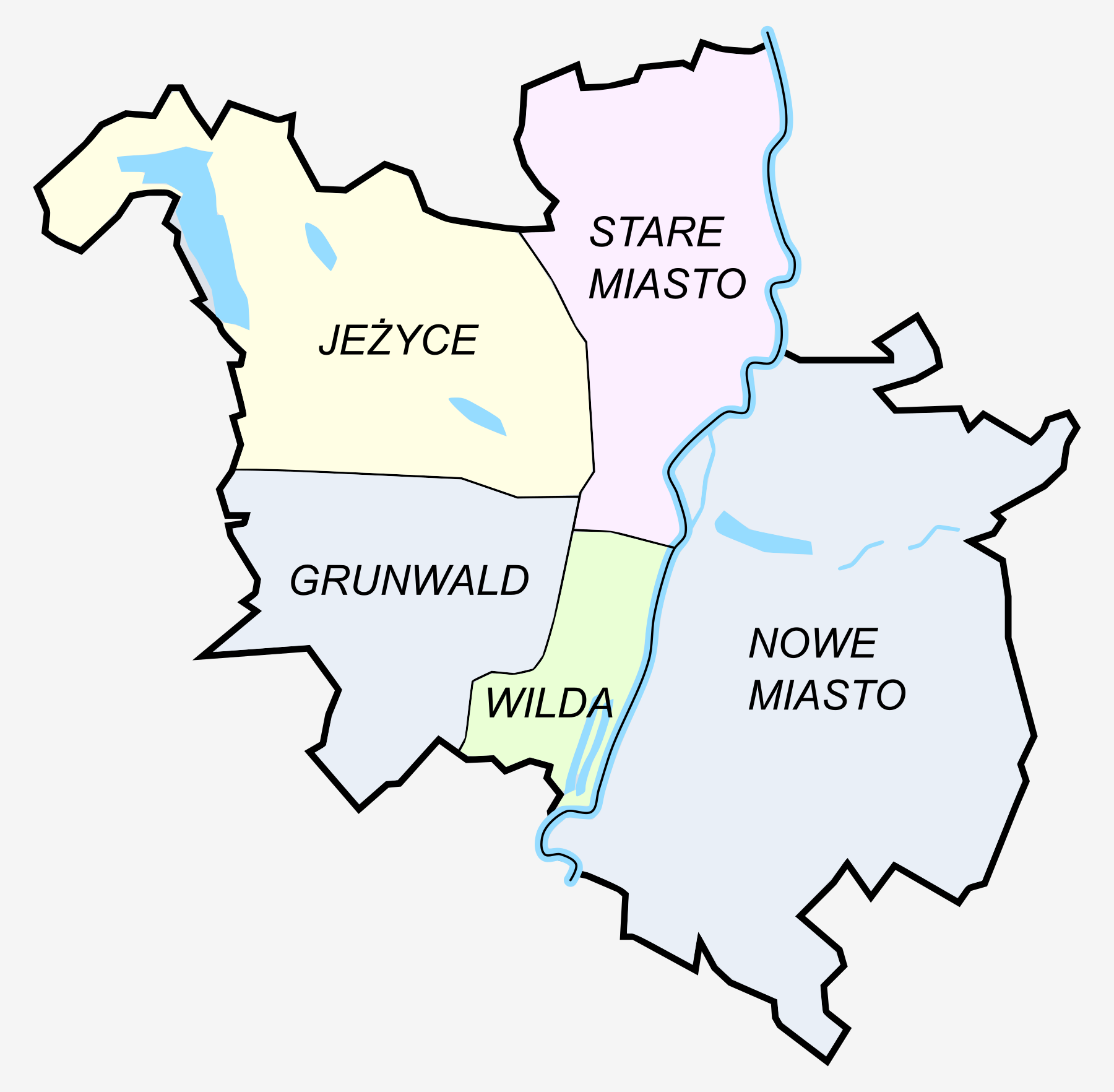
Former division of Poznań into five districts

Grunwald [ˈɡrunvalt] is a part of the city of Poznań in western Poland. It was one of the five governmental districts (dzielnica) into which the city was divided prior to 1990, and which are retained for certain administrative purposes (see Administrative division of Poznań).

The name "Grunwald" comes from the name of the street ulica Grunwaldzka, which had been so named in 1919 in commemoration of the Battle of Grunwald. A neighbourhood located in the vicinity of that street came to be known as Grunwald, and that name was transferred to the entire dzielnica, covering the south-western parts of the city, on its creation in 1954. The name continues to be popularly used to refer specifically to the original neighbourhood, as reflected in the names of three of the osiedles into which Poznań is now divided: Stary Grunwald ("Old Grunwald"), Grunwald Północ ("Grunwald North") and Grunwald Południe ("Grunwald South"). For other osiedles contained within the wider district, see Administrative division of Poznań.

Grunwald has an area of 36.2 square kilometres (14.0 sq mi), which is 13.8% of the total area of Poznań. Its population of 125,500 accounts for 21.9% of the city's total. The population density is 3,467 persons/km².

Grunwald is bounded by the districts of Wilda and Stare Miasto to the east, and Jeżyce to the north. It is also bordered by the town of Luboń to the south, and the administrative districts (gminas) of Dopiewo to the west and Komorniki to the south-west.

== Geography ==
The boundary between Grunwald and Jeżyce is marked by the street ulica Bukowska, which runs from the city centre to Poznań Ławica Airport (and onwards towards Buk). Grunwald's eastern boundary largely coincides with the railway line running south and then west from Poznań's main station (Poznań Główny).

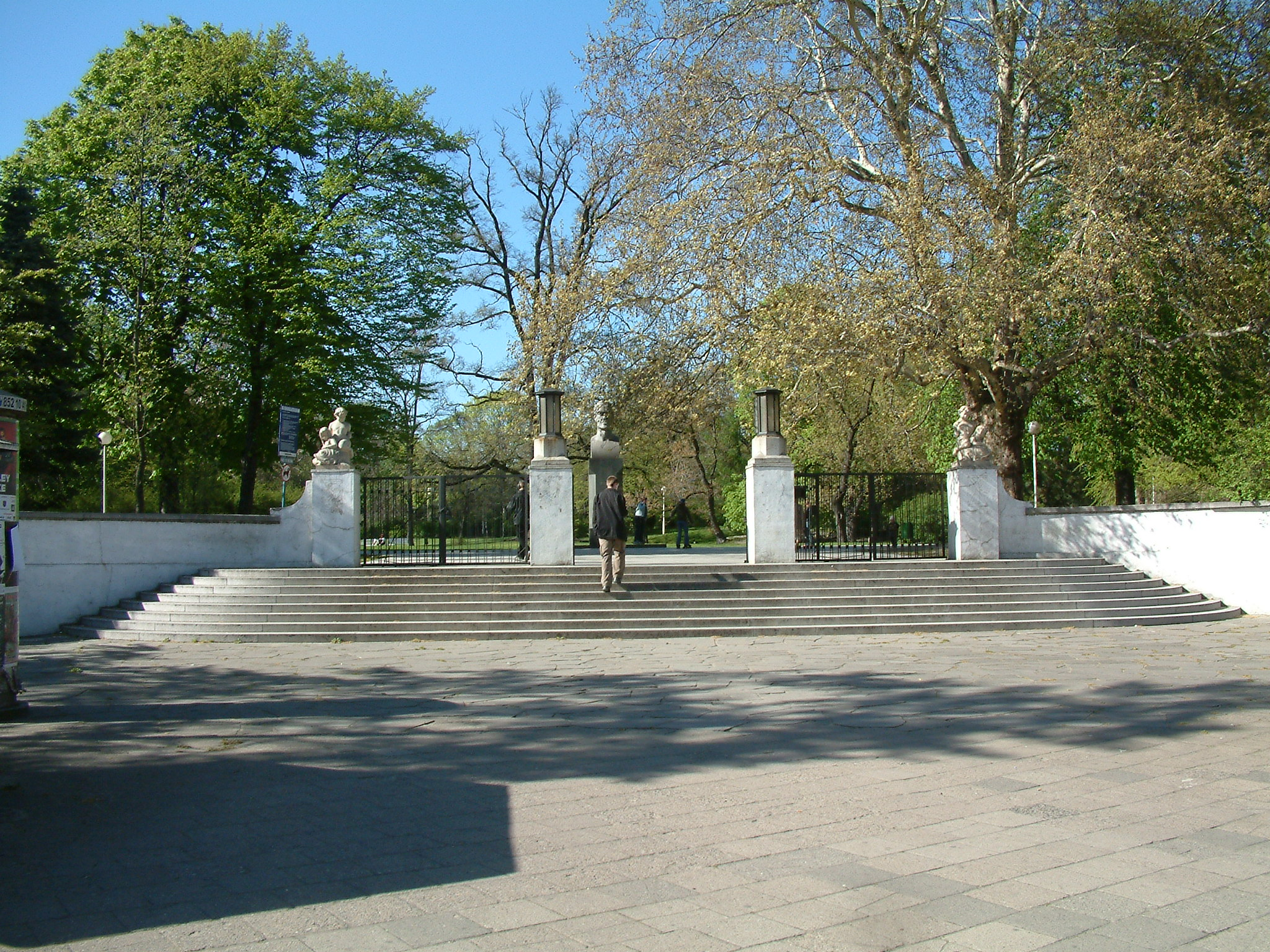
Entrance to Park Wilsona from Głogowska

At the north-east corner of Grunwald is the Poznań International Fairs site. South of this is the western entrance to Poznań Główny station, and then an industrial area adjacent to the railway. Leading south-west from the station is the main street ulica Głogowska, which runs past Park Wilsona – a park named for U.S. President Woodrow Wilson, containing a band shell and Poznań's Palm House (Palmiarnia). Głogowska then passes through the old district of Łazarz (with its open-air market, Rynek Łazarski), crosses the western branch of the railway at Górczyn, meets the A2 motorway at the Komorniki junction at the southern edge of the city, and continues towards Wrocław. Another main radial route is ulica Grunwaldzka, which passes through Grunwald's main residential areas, including Ostroróg in the north of the district, the modern osiedle Kopernika ("Copernicus estate"), and Junikowo and Plewiska in the south-west. Junikowo is the site of one of Poznań's two main cemeteries (the other being at Miłostowo in Nowe Miasto). Close to Grunwaldzka's junction with ulica Bułgarska is the city's main football stadium (Stadion Miejski), home ground of Lech Poznań and a Euro 2012 group C venue.

North of Junikowo is an extensive green area, including the Marcelin Woods (Lasek Marceliński). North of this are the neighbourhoods of Marcelin, Pogodno, Edwardowo, Wydmy and Ławica (which gives its name to Poznań Ławica Airport, situated just to the north in Jeżyce district).

Other neighbourhoods within Grunwald include Skórzewo to the north-west of Junikowo cemetery (adjoining a village outside the city boundary also called Skórzewo), Raszyn between Górczyn and Osiedle Kopernika, Zatorze to the east of Górczyn, and the mainly industrial Rudnicze and Kopanina south of Junikowo. Beginning between Rudnicze and Kopanina and running south is a series of small lakes, and the Junikowo Stream (Strumień Junikowski) also flows through this region, eventually reaching the Warta river in Luboń.

In the extreme south-west of Grunwald are the neighbourhoods of Fabianowo and Kotowo, and an Auchan retail park close to the A2 junction.

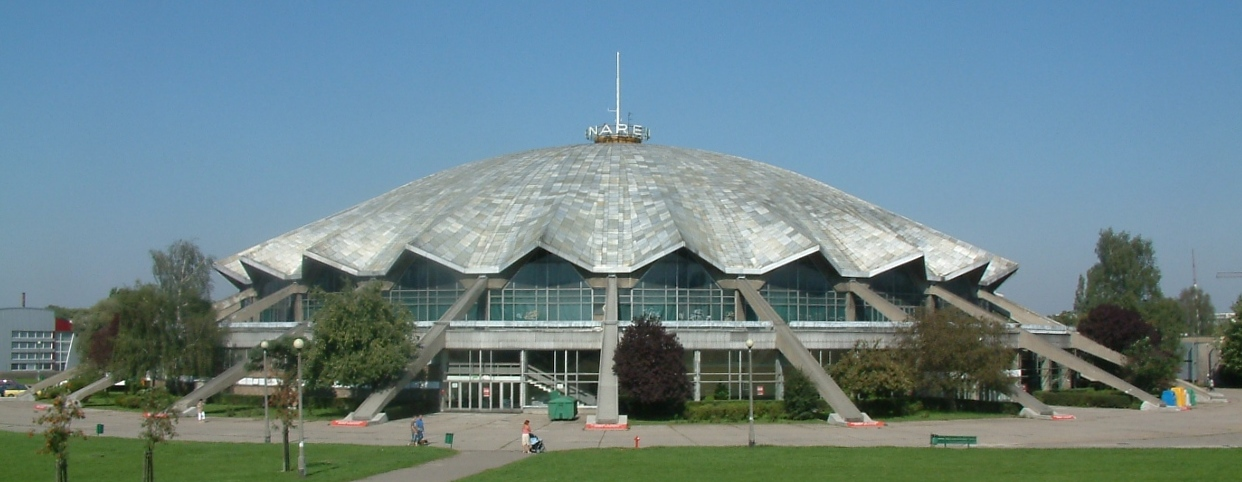
The Arena venue

The areas in the heart of Grunwald, east of Łazarz, formerly contained extensive military barracks, originally built under German rule in the late 19th century to house the troops building and manning the city's defensive forts (see Poznań Fortress). These areas are now mainly residential. Also in this area is Jan Kasprowicz Park, which contains the Arena indoor sports and concert venue, as well as other sports grounds.

The branch of the railway running west towards Berlin passes through southern Grunwald, where the stations Poznań Górczyn and Poznań Junikowo are situated. Górczyn and Junikowo are also termini for trams running along Głogowska and Grunwaldzka to the city centre; Górczyn is also a bus terminus.

== History ==
Of the neighbourhoods in today's Grunwald district, the first to be brought within the city of Poznań were Łazarz and Górczyn, in the expansion of the city boundaries which took place in 1900 (when Poznań was part of the German Empire). Most of the remainder of the district was incorporated into the city in 1940–1942, during the Nazi occupation. At this time the neighbourhoods were given German names, including Hermannstadt for Łazarz, Lenzingen for Junikowo and Steineck for Ławica.

The neighbourhood of Plewiska was brought within the city boundaries in 1987 (with part remaining outside the city as a separate village).

One historic building is the Evangelical-Augsburg Chapel, Poznań.
