= Strzeszyn, Poznań =

Neighbourhood in Poznań, Poland

Strzeszyn
- Neighbourhood
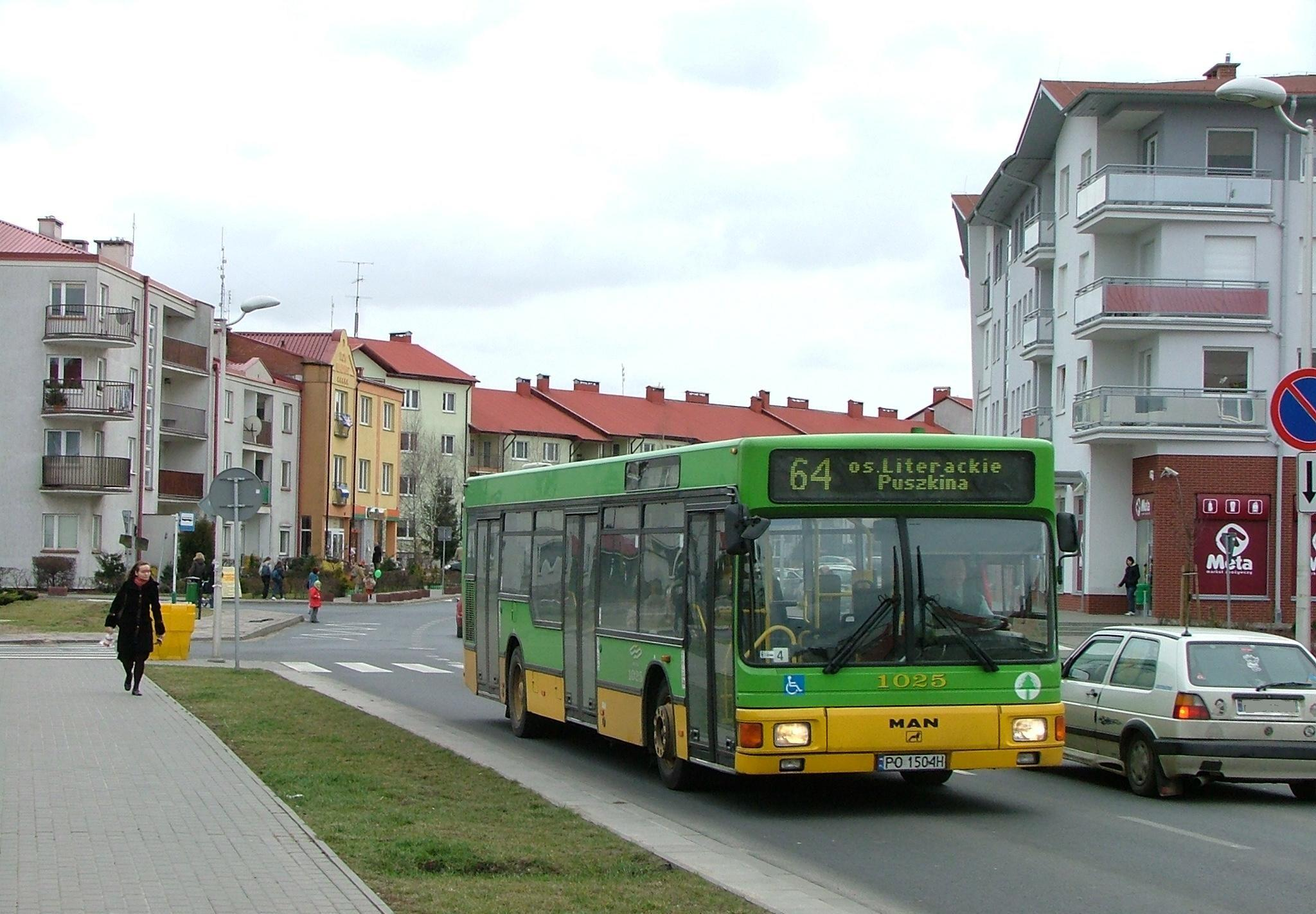
- Central part of Strzeszyn Grecki

- Location within Poland
- Coordinates: 52°27′31.34″N 16°50′55.85″E
- Country: Poland
- Voivodeship: Greater Poland
- City: Poznań

Area
  - Total: 12 km^{2} (4.6 sq mi)

Population (2010)
  - Total: 6,703
  - Density: 560/km^{2} (1,400/sq mi)
- Time zone: UTC+1:00 (CET)
  - Summer (DST): UTC+2:00 (CEST)

Strzeszyn [ˈstʂɛʂɨn] is a suburban neighbourhood of the city of Poznań in western Poland. It is located in the north-west of the city, to the west of Podolany, from which it is separated by the main railway line running northwards towards Piła. A railway station called Poznań Strzeszyn is situated on this line some distance north of the residential parts of Strzeszyn.

== Overview ==
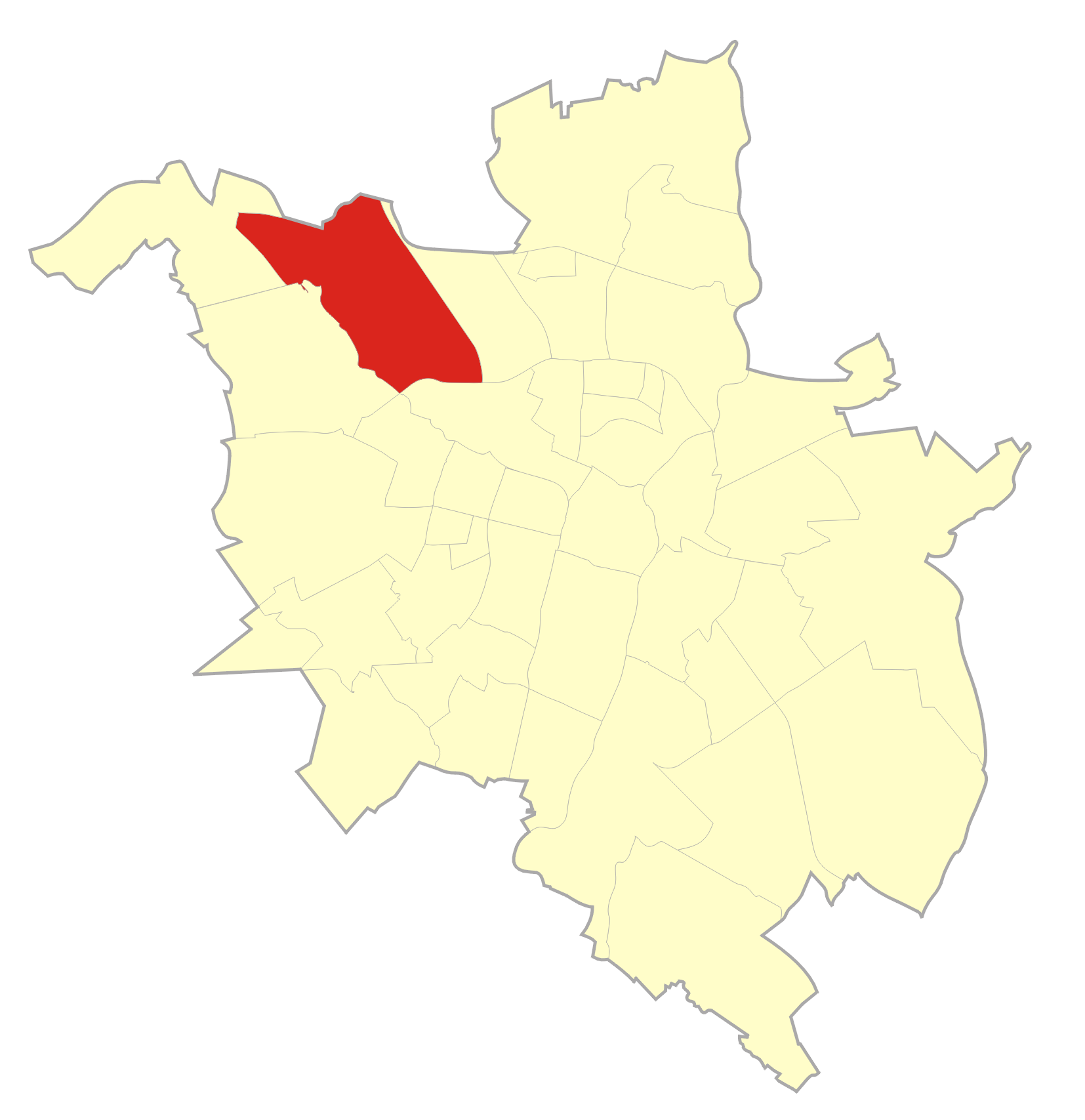
The osiedle of Strzeszyn within Poznań

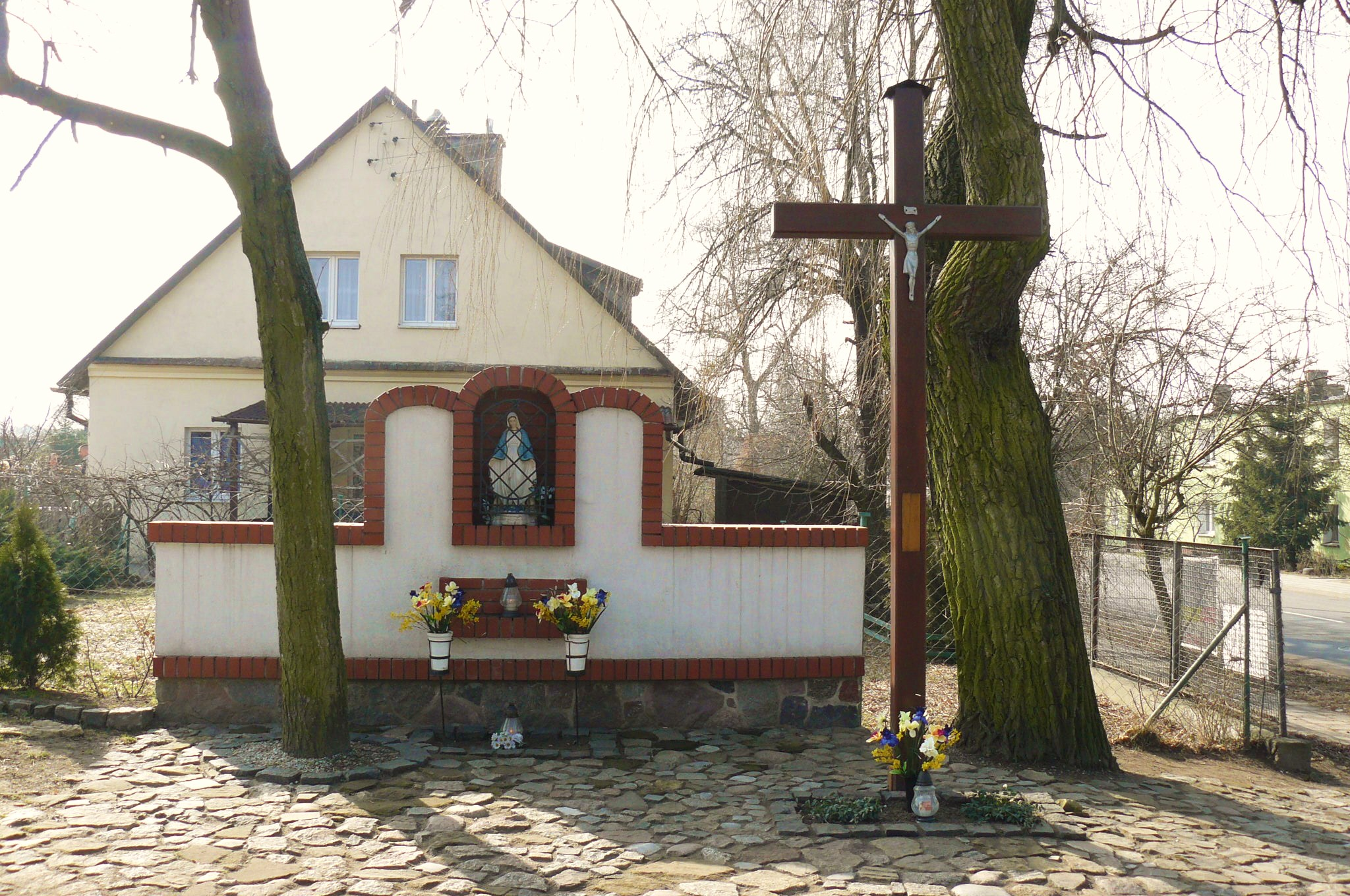
A roadside cross in Old Strzeszyn

Until 1990 Strzeszyn was part of the wider district (dzielnica) of Jeżyce, and remains so for certain administrative purposes. In 1996 an osiedle (urban neighbourhood with an elected council) of Strzeszyn was created. This, with modified boundaries, is now one of the 42 osiedles into which the entire area of Poznań is divided (see Administrative division of Poznań). In 2010 the population of Strzeszyn osiedle was 6,703, and it covered an area of 12 square kilometres (4.6 sq mi).

Straeszyn is conventionally divided into several parts: Strzeszyn Stary (Old Strzeszyn) to the north, and the newer estates to the south: osiedle Literackie ("literary estate"; also known as osiedle Parkowe "park estate"), whose streets are named after writers; Strzeszyn Grecki ("Greek Strzeszyn"), whose streets are named after Ancient Greeks and Romans; and osiedle Wojskowe ("military estate"), built around 2010 chiefly for military personnel.

To the south is the artificial lake Rusałka, constructed during Nazi occupation on the Bogdanka stream. Further to the north, also on the Bogdanka, to the north-west of the residential parts of Strzeszyn, is the natural Jezioro Strzeszyńskie (Strzeszyn Lake), next to which is the recreational area of Strzeszynek (the name being a diminutive of "Strzeszyn").

The village of Strzeszyn was first recorded in 1388. A church stood there in the 15th and 16th centuries. The village became part of the city of Poznań in 1940, during the Nazi occupation.

A parish church, named for Padre Pio (kościół parafialny św. Ojca Pio) was completed in Strzeszyn Grecki in 2011. Old Strzeszyn is served by the parish church in Podolany to the east.
