= Bambers =

Germans who settled in Poland 1719–1753

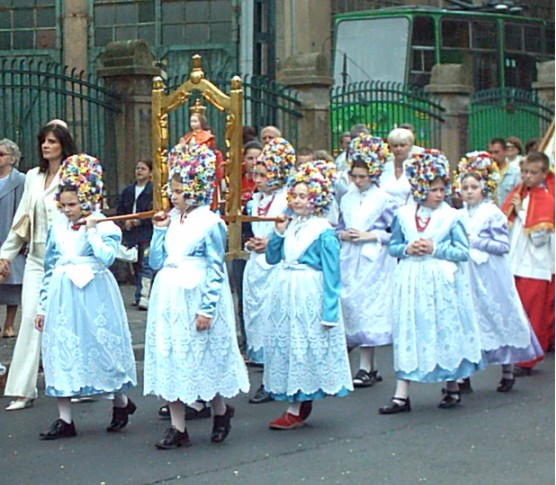
Girls wearing unmarried women's dresses during a Corpus Christi procession in Jeżyce, a borough of Poznań

Bambers, (Note: Polish: Bambrzy, Bambry) also known as Poznań Bambergians, (Note: Polish: Poznańskie Bambry; German: Posener Bamberger) are Poles who are partly descended from Germans who moved from the area of Bamberg (Upper Franconia, Germany) to villages surrounding Poznań, Poland. They settled in villages which had been destroyed during the Great Northern War and the subsequent epidemic of plague, including:

- 1719 in Luboń
- 1730 in Dębiec, Jeżyce, Winiary and Bonin
- 1746–1747 in Rataje and Wilda
- 1750–1753 in Jeżyce and Górczyn

== History and meaning ==
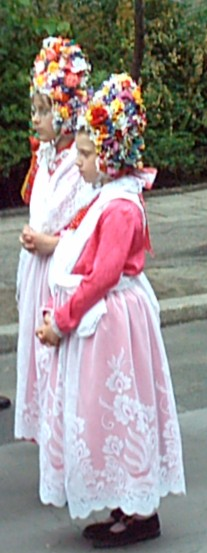
Traditional Bamberka costume

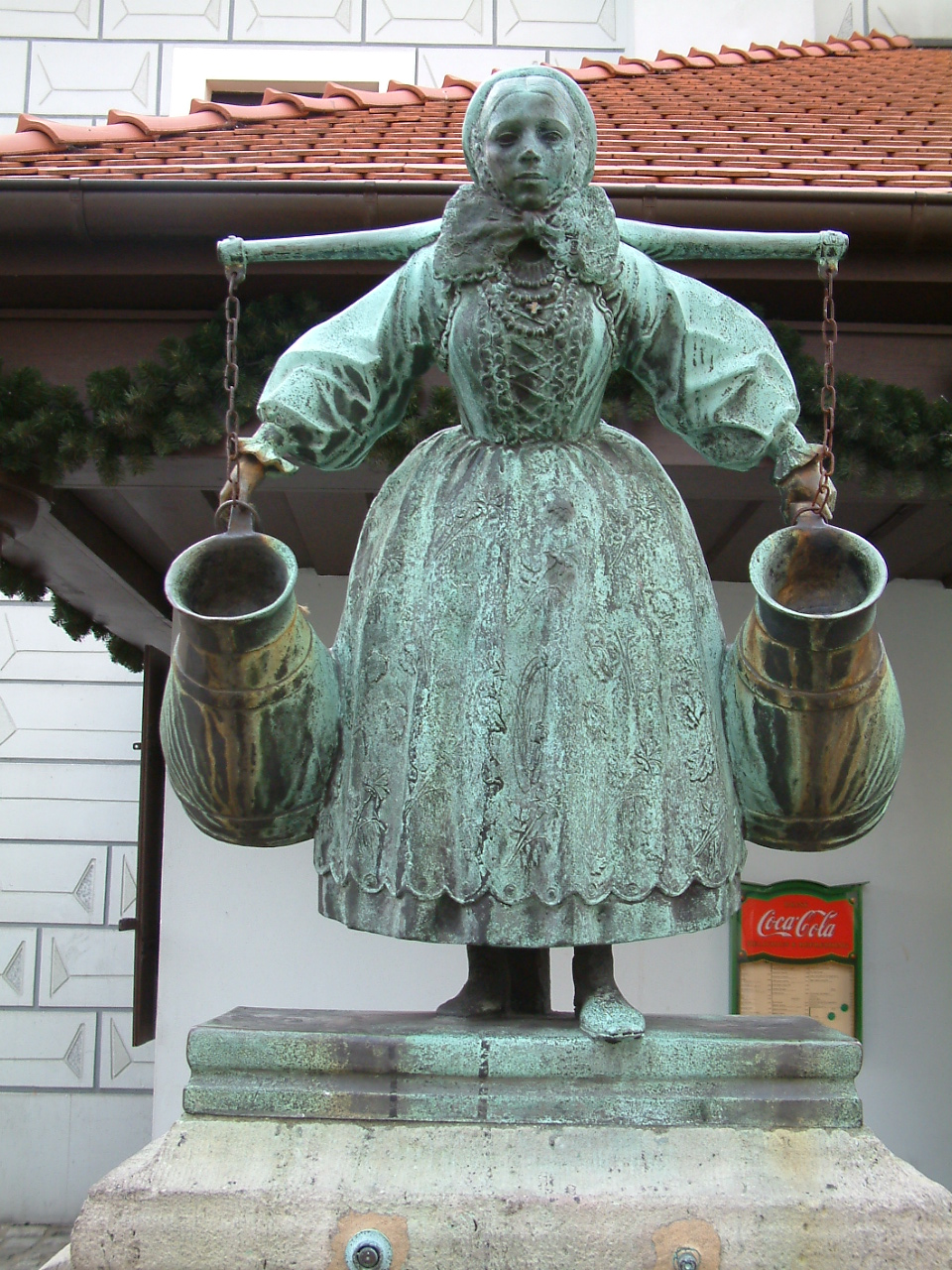
"Bamberka" from Czarnków

After the economically important villages surrounding Poznań were devastated by the war and the plague, the city authorities decided to attempt to replenish their population through immigration. King Augustus II of 1710 allowed this, as long as the newly arrived settlers were Catholic. About 700 Germans came in several waves. At least 450 to 500 men and women came to Poland according to surviving contracts, however, later documents suggest this number may have been as high as 900 people in four waves of immigration.

The integration of the group was voluntary, and some families were already Polonised by 1800. Many of the settlers learned Polish in order to attend Catholic masses, and their children learned Polish at school. Mixed marriages with Poles living in the area began to happen. By the end of the 19th century, during the Chancellor Bismarck's policy of Germanisation in Poland, all residents in villages inhabited by the settlers chose Polish nationality during Prussian and German censuses. The Bambers as a group opposed the Germanisation policy.

The word "bamber" later expanded in meaning in Polish to denote well-off farmers in general, regardless of heritage. According to Culture.pl, this was due to the success of many Bambers due to good economic terms and hard work. Sometime after the early 20th century, it also came to be used to mean "backwards, primitive person". According to Culture.pl, this is because the Bambers often remained farmers after the Poznań expanded and annexed the villages in the early 20th century.

In the late 19th century, the meaning of the word "Bamber" (singular form) became wider - it started to denote all people living in those villages, regardless of their ethnic or cultural background. Many of them were soldiers of the Polish army fighting in the Great Poland Uprising. During the German occupation of Poland most of them, like most Poles, were persecuted for their Polish identity. After World War II, they were the subject of suspicion from the Polish communist government due to their German-sounding surnames and faced repression, including sometimes the confiscation of their land and property. The situation improved after the fall of communism in Poland in 1989.

== Culture ==
A well known aspect of Bamber culture is its extravagant female dresses.
