= Administrative division of Poznań =

Since 2011, the Polish city of Poznań has been divided into 42 osiedles or neighbourhoods, each of which has its own elected council with certain decision-making and spending powers. The first uniform elections for these councils were held on 20 March 2011.

From 1954 to 1990, Poznań was divided into five dzielnicas, called Stare Miasto, Nowe Miasto, Jeżyce, Grunwald and Wilda. These ceased to exist as governmental units in 1990, although they are still used as areas of jurisdiction for certain administrative offices. Some osiedle councils were set up during the years to 2010, but the present division introduced in 2011 is the first to provide a uniform set of units of this type covering the whole area of the city.

Note that the city contains many housing estates and residential areas whose names include the word "osiedle"; not all of these are osiedles in the sense of the administrative division discussed here.

== Former and current divisions ==
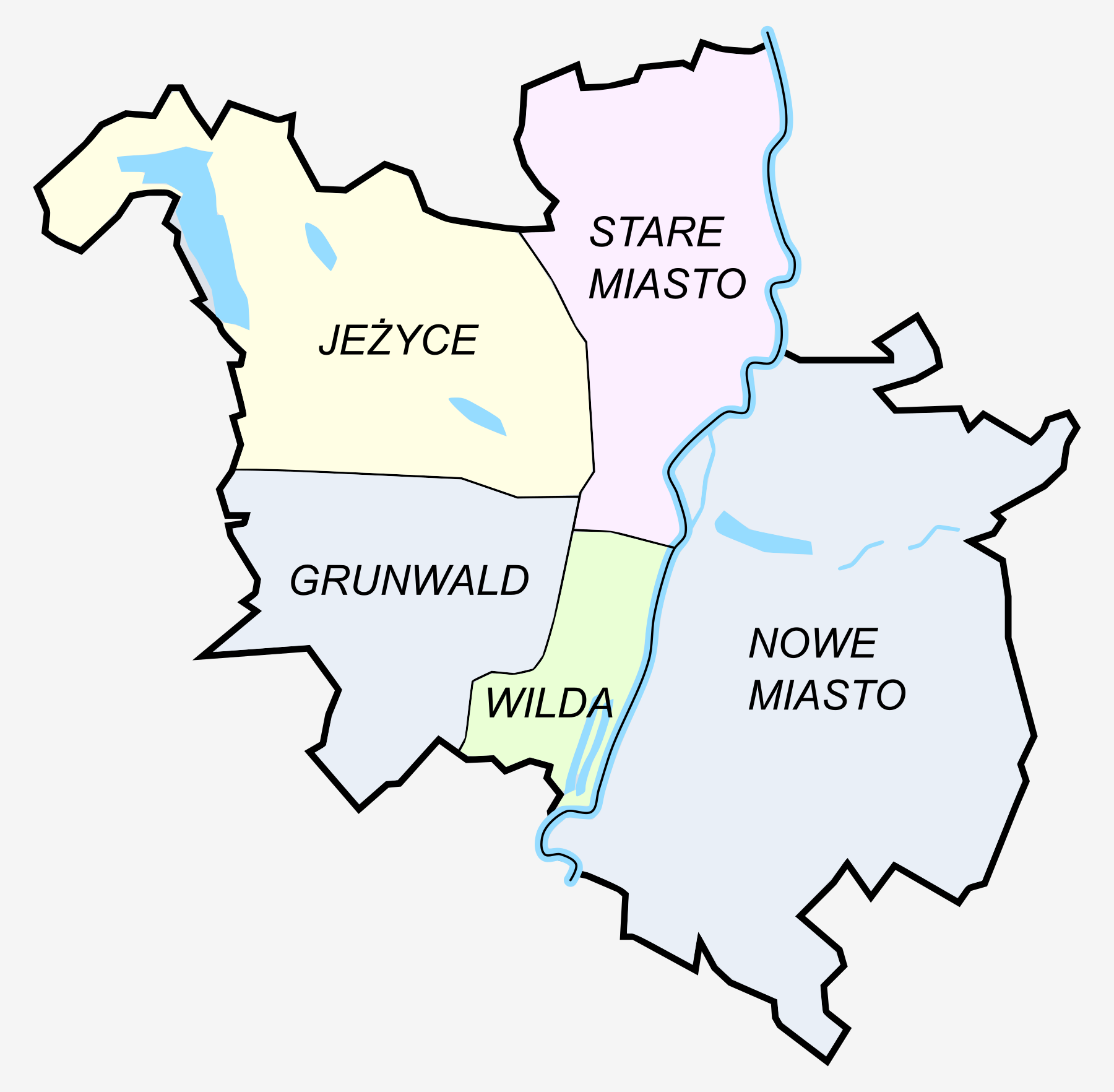
The pre-1990 division of Poznań into dzielnicas. These are still retained for some administrative purposes.

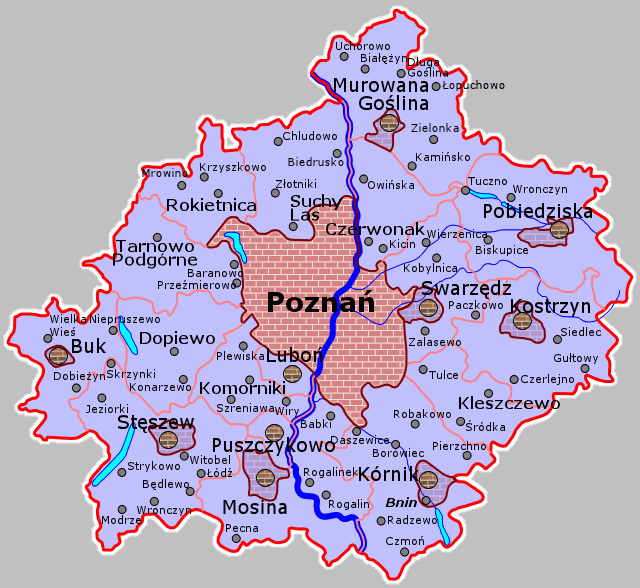
A map showing the administrative division of Poznań County (powiat poznański), which covers the areas surrounding Poznań. The county seat and offices are in the city of Poznań, but the county does not include the city.

The map to the right shows the former division of the city into five districts called dzielnicas. The names Stare Miasto ("Old Town"), Jeżyce and Wilda are taken from neighbourhoods within those districts (the Poznań Old Town neighbourhood and the old neighbourhoods of Jeżyce and Wilda); similarly the name Grunwald can also refer to a relatively small neighbourhood within that district. The district of Nowe Miasto ("New Town") covered the parts of the city east of the main stream of the river Warta.

The boundaries of these former districts mostly coincide with boundaries between the post-2011 osiedles. The present 42 osiedles are listed below, according to which former district they are contained within. Further down the page is a map of these osiedles and a table of population and area data.

=== Stare Miasto ===
Osiedles within the former dzielnica of Stare Miasto:

- Stare Miasto ("Old Town") – covers the central part of Poznań, including the Old Town neighbourhood itself
- Stare Winogrady ("Old Winogrady") – covers the southern and eastern parts of the Winogrady neighbourhood
- Nowe Winogrady Północ ("New Winogrady North") – covers the northern and north-western parts of the post-1960s estates in Winogrady
- Nowe Winogrady Wschód ("New Winogrady East") – covers the north-eastern parts of those estates
- Nowe Winogrady Południe ("New Winogrady South") – covers the southern parts of those estates
- Piątkowo – covers the main estates in the Piątkowo neighbourhood
- Jana III Sobieskiego i Marysieńki – includes two estates in the north of Piątkowo
- Naramowice – covers the Naramowice neighbourhood and surrounding areas, north of Winogrady, including the Łokietka estate in Piątkowo
- Umultowo – covers the Umultowo neighbourhood and surrounding areas, north of Naramowice
- Morasko-Radojewo – covers the areas of Morasko and Radojewo in the most northerly part of the city

=== Jeżyce ===
Osiedles within the former dzielnica of Jeżyce:

- Jeżyce – covers the old neighbourhood of Jeżyce
- Ogrody – the Ogrody ("Gardens") neighbourhood west of the old neighbourhood of Jeżyce
- Wola – the Wola neighbourhood west of Ogrody
- Krzyżowniki-Smochowice – the two neighbourhoods of Krzyżowniki and Smochowice, on the western edge of the city
- Sołacz – the Sołacz neighbourhood and surrounding areas
- Winiary – the Winiary neighbourhood north of Sołacz (Winiary was originally the name of villages north of central Poznań, which were moved to this neighbourhood in the 1830s to enable the construction of Fort Winiary)
- Podolany – the Podolany neighbourhood north of Sołacz
- Strzeszyn – the Strzeszyn neighbourhood west of Podolany
- Kiekrz – the Kiekrz neighbourhood in the extreme north-west of the city
- (for Ławica see below)

=== Grunwald ===
Osiedles within the former dzielnica of Grunwald:

- Święty Łazarz – the old Łazarz neighbourhood
- Stary Grunwald ("Old Grunwald") – the heart of the older neighbourhood of Grunwald
- Grunwald Północ ("Grunwald North") – the northern part of the older neighbourhood of Grunwald
- Grunwald Południe ("Grunwald South") – the southern part of the older neighbourhood of Grunwald
- Ławica – Ławica and surrounding neighbourhoods on the western edge of the city; includes Poznań Ławica Airport (which was in Jeżyce district)
- Górczyn – the Górczyn neighbourhood south of Łazarz
- Junikowo – the Junikowo neighbourhood west of Górczyn, including a large municipal cemetery
- Osiedle Kwiatowe ("Flower Estate") – a residential neighbourhood on the western edge of the city, also called Plewiska
- Fabianowo-Kotowo – the neighbourhoods of Fabianowo and Kotowo on the south-western edge of the city

=== Wilda ===
Osiedles within the former dzielnica of Wilda:

- Wilda – the old Wilda neighbourhood and surrounding areas
- Zielony Dębiec ("Green Dębiec") – the Dębiec neighbourhood on the southern edge of the city
- Świerczewo – the residential Świerczewo neighbourhood west of Dębiec

=== Nowe Miasto ===
Osiedles within the former dzielnica of Nowe Miasto:

- Ostrów Tumski-Śródka-Zawady-Komandoria – covers Ostrów Tumski (the "Cathedral Island"), the old neighbourhood of Śródka and the nearby Zawady and Komandoria neighbourhoods
- Główna – the Główna neighbourhood in the north-east of the city
- Warszawskie-Pomet-Maltańskie – three residential areas north of Lake Malta
- Antoninek-Zieliniec-Kobylepole – three neighbourhoods in the east of the city
- Rataje – covers the estates in the western part of the Rataje area
- Chartowo – the north-eastern part of the Rataje estates
- Żegrze – the south-eastern part of the Rataje estates
- Starołęka-Minikowo-Marlewo – three neighbourhoods in the south of the city
- Głuszyna – an area mainly of rural character in the far south of the city
- Krzesiny-Pokrzywno-Garaszewo – neighbourhoods on the edge of the city, south of the Rataje estates (Krzesiny is the site of the 31st Air Base)
- Szczepankowo-Spławie-Krzesinki – neighbourhoods on the edge of the city south-east of the Rataje estates

== Map of osiedles ==
The map below shows the present division of Poznań into 42 osiedles.

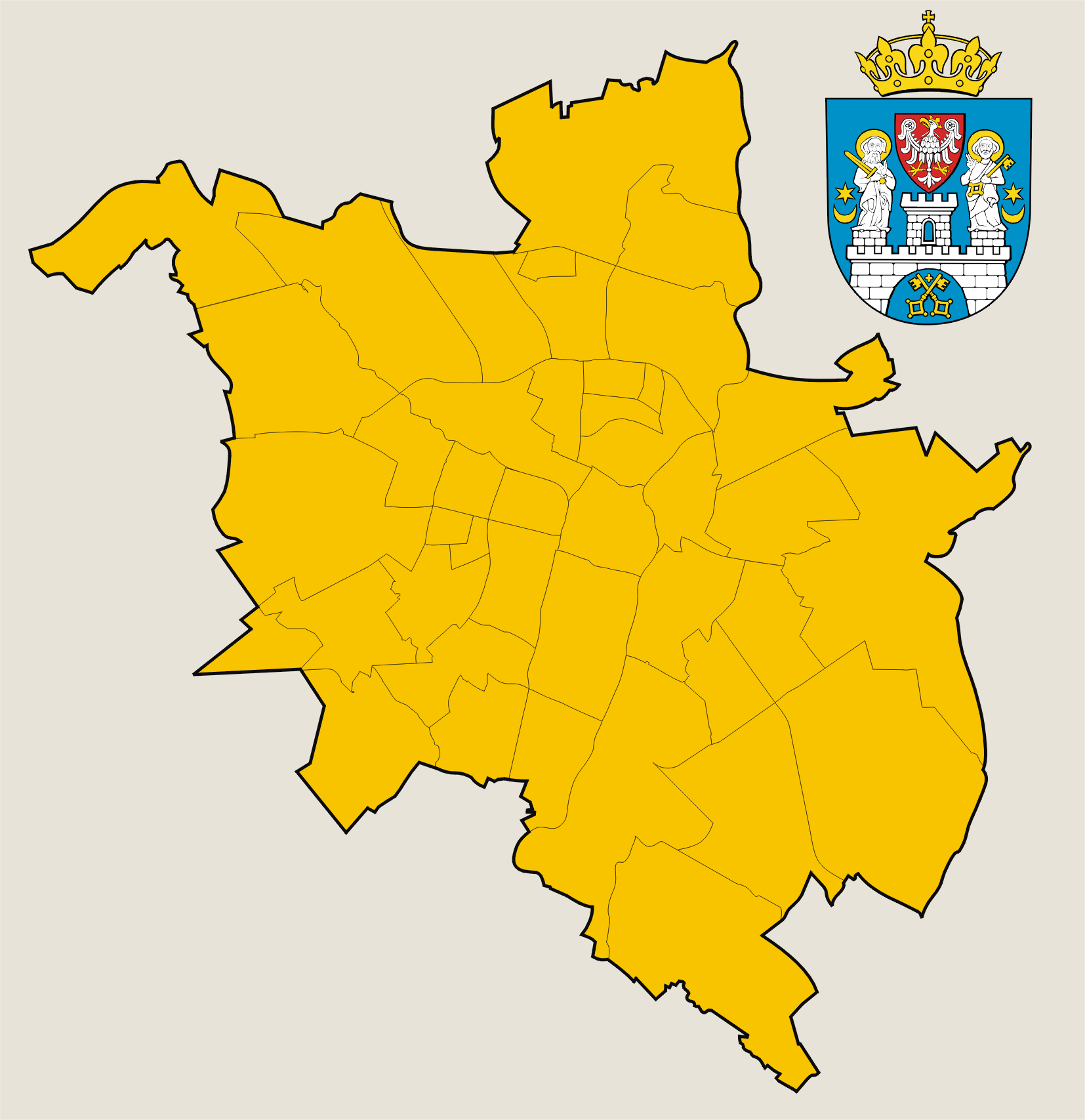
The 42 osiedles of Poznań as of 2011.

== Population and area data ==
The following sortable table contains population and area data for the 42 osiedles.

Osiedle	Population (2010 estimate)	Area (km^{2})	Population density (per km^{2})
Antoninek-Zieliniec-Kobylepole	9,881	20.54	481.06
Chartowo	24,750	4.49	5,512.25
Fabianowo-Kotowo	1,736	7.1	244.51
Główna	3,997	6.82	586.07
Głuszyna	3,834	14.43	265.70
Górczyn	13,230	4.33	3,055.43
Grunwald Północ	15,177	0.76	19,969.74
Grunwald Południe	25,808	3.83	6,738.38
Jana III Sobieskiego i Marysieńki	10,042	0.79	12,711.40
Jeżyce	24,172	1.98	12,208.08
Junikowo	8,789	5.29	1,699.24
Kiekrz	1,716	10.25	167.41
Krzesiny-Pokrzywno-Garaszewo	2,107	9.99	210.91
Krzyżowniki-Smochowice	7,750	10.71	723.62
Osiedle Kwiatowe	4,539	2.31	1,964.94
Ławica	6,312	13.94	452.80
Morasko-Radojewo	1,871	18.03	103.77
Naramowice	14,655	7.21	2,032.59
Nowe Winogrady Południe	15,706	1.14	13,777.19
Nowe Winogrady Północ	17,787	1.14	15,602.63
Nowe Winogrady Wschód	6,849	0.47	14,572.34
Ogrody	6,703	1.95	3,437.44
Ostrów Tumski-Śródka-Zawady-Komandoria	5,690	3.36	1,693.45
Piątkowo	36,605	3.84	9,532.55
Podolany	7,091	5.30	1,337.92
Rataje	37,864	5.2	7,281.54
Sołacz	5,390	5.54	972.92
Stare Miasto	30,216	3.91	7,727.88
Stare Winogrady	7,400	3.48	2,126.44
Starołęka-Minikowo-Marlewo	9,291	13.48	689.24
Stary Grunwald	3,594	0.63	5,704.76
Strzeszyn	6,703	12	558.58
Szczepankowo-Spławie-Krzesinki	6,282	18.44	340.67
Świerczewo	14,252	3.94	3,617.26
Św. Łazarz	35,909	3.7	9,705.14
Umultowo	4,081	6.12	666.83
Warszawskie-Pomet-Maltańskie	7,014	5.85	1,198.97
Wilda	28,510	6.9	4,131.88
Winiary	14,484	2.17	6,674.65
Wola	5,398	3.27	1,650.76
Żegrze	18,631	3.15	5,914.60
Zielony Dębiec	13,248	4.12	3,215.53
