= Wilda, Poznań =

City district in Poznań, Poland

Coordinates: 52°23′35″N 16°55′13″E

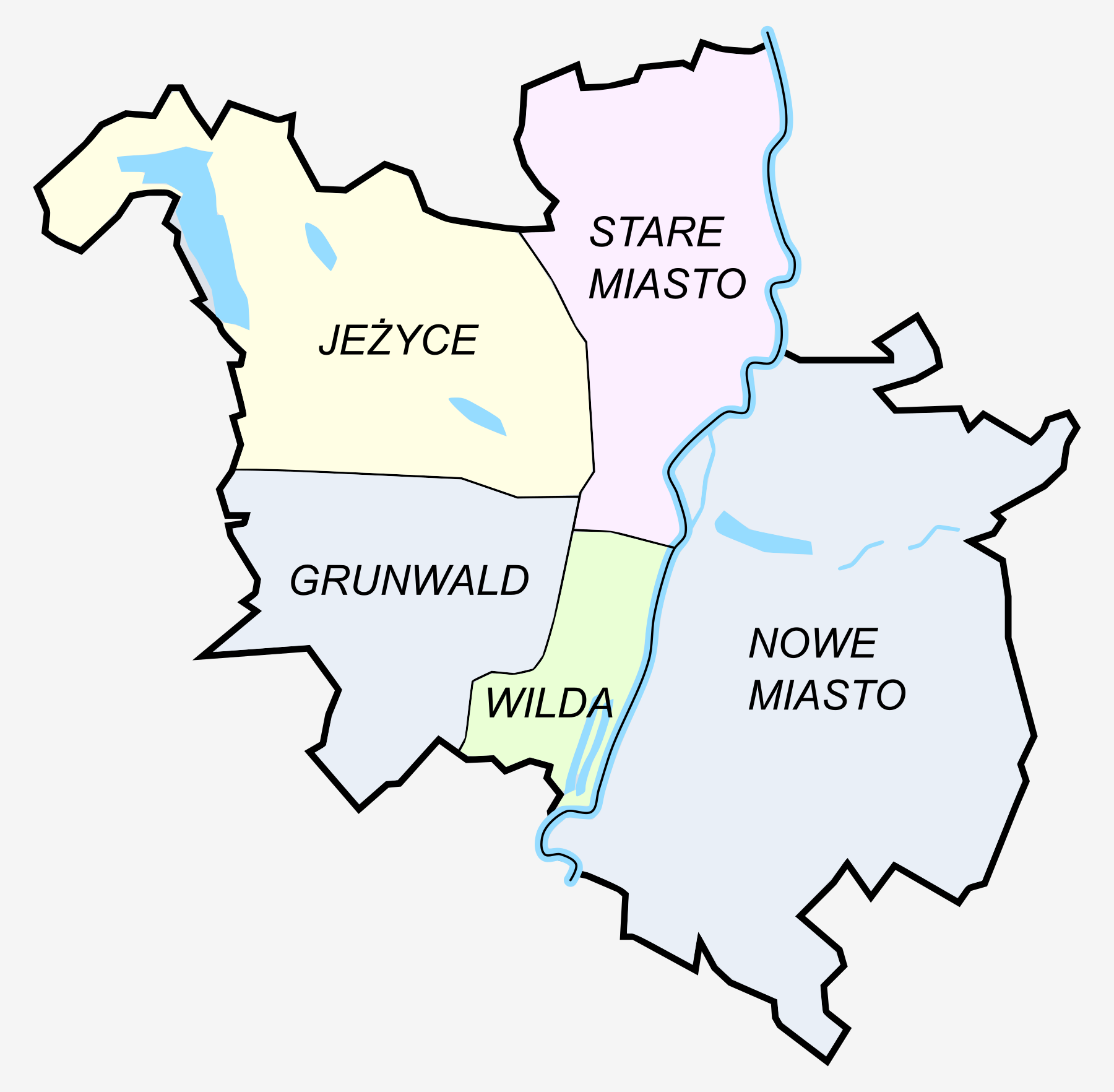
Local government districts of Poznań

Wilda [ˈvilda] (German Wilda or Wilde) is a southern part of the city of Poznań in western Poland. It was the smallest of the five governmental districts (dzielnicas) into which the city was divided prior to 1990, and which are retained for certain administrative purposes. For details, see Administrative division of Poznań.

The name Wilda more popularly refers to a narrower area – the old neighbourhood (and former village) of Wilda, centred on the Rynek Wildecki market. This forms the northern part of the wider district of Wilda discussed in this article, and closely corresponds to the osiedle named Wilda in the new administrative division of Poznań. The wider district of Wilda also contains two other osiedles: Zielony Dębiec ("Green Dębiec") and Świerczewo.

The district of Wilda has an area of 15 square kilometres (5.8 sq mi), which is 5.8% of the total area of Poznań. Its population of 63,800 accounts for 11.1% of the city's total. The population density is 4,253 persons/km^{2}

Wilda is bounded by the districts of Stare Miasto ("Old Town") to the north, Grunwald to the west, and Nowe Miasto ("New Town") across the Warta river to the east. It is also bordered by the town of Luboń to the south.

== Geography ==
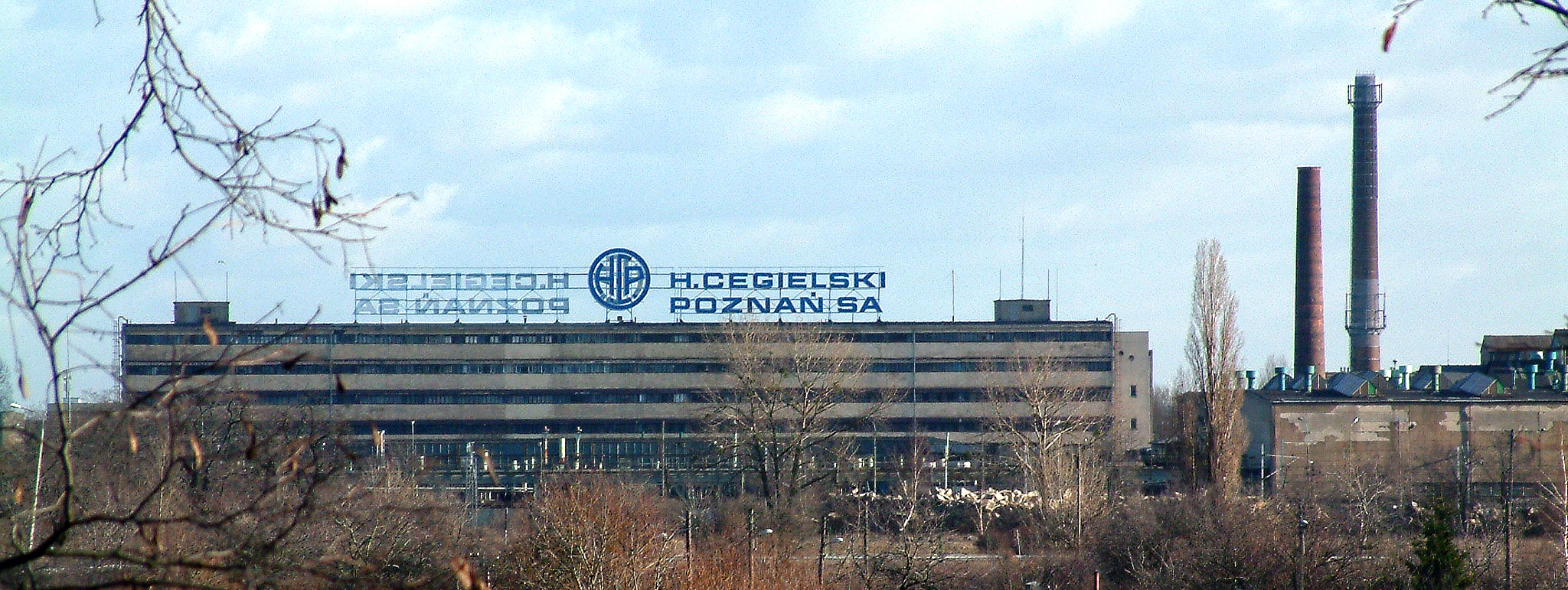
View of the Cegielski factory

Poznań's main rail station, Poznań Główny, is located in Wilda's north-west corner, with the central PKS coach station slightly to the east. Also in the north of Wilda is Poznań's College of Physical Education (AWF), a stadium and a number of sports facilities. South of the station is the ZNTK rail vehicle repair and manufacturing plant, and further south still is the Cegielski factory.

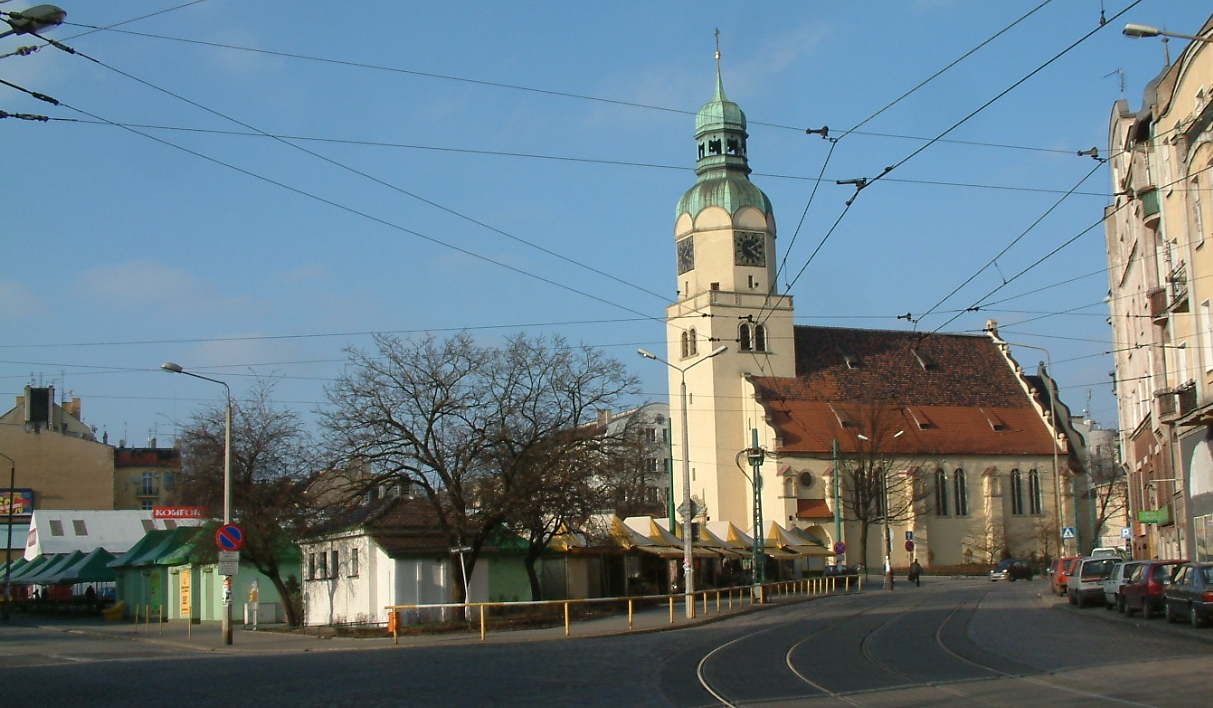
Rynek Wildecki

The old neighbourhood of Wilda lies to the east of the ZNTK plant. Its central point is Rynek Wildecki (Wilda Market Place), which contains an open-air market. The former Wilda cinema to the north of this (built 1962) has been closed since 2006, but there is now a Multikino multiplex cinema ("Multikino 51", opened 1998) located at the district's northern edge.

A belt of green land runs along the Warta river on the district's eastern edge. To the south, this includes the Dębina park complex and water intake facility.

To the west of Dębina is the residential district of Dębiec, and west of this is Świerczewo.

== History ==
Parts of the district along the left bank of the Warta became part of Poznań at the end of the 18th century, when the city's Prussian rulers expanded its boundaries beyond the line of the medieval city walls. However the old district of Wilda did not become part of the city until the subsequent expansion of the boundaries in 1900. The Cegielski company (which had previously operated in other parts of Poznań) acquired its present site in the south of Wilda in 1919–1920, following the return to Polish rule.

Dębiec was incorporated into Poznań in the expansion of 1925 (during the time of the Second Polish Republic), and Świerczewo was added in the expansion of 1940–1942 carried out under Nazi occupation.

== Transport ==
The railway line running south from the main station (initially along Wilda's western edge) splits into three branches south of the Cegielski plant: one runs west towards Berlin, one south towards Wrocław, and one south-east towards Katowice. There are two smaller stations in Wilda: Poznań Dębiec on the southern branch, and Poznań Dębina on the eastern branch.

Trams run through Wilda from the city centre, terminating at Dębiec, which is also served by a number of bus routes.

Junction 10 of the A2 motorway (the Poznań Luboń junction) is situated south-west of the water intake, providing access to Wilda and central Poznań to the north, and Luboń to the south.

== Notable residents ==
- Germaine Krull (1897–1985), artist
