= Lake Rusałka (Poznań) =

Lake in Poland

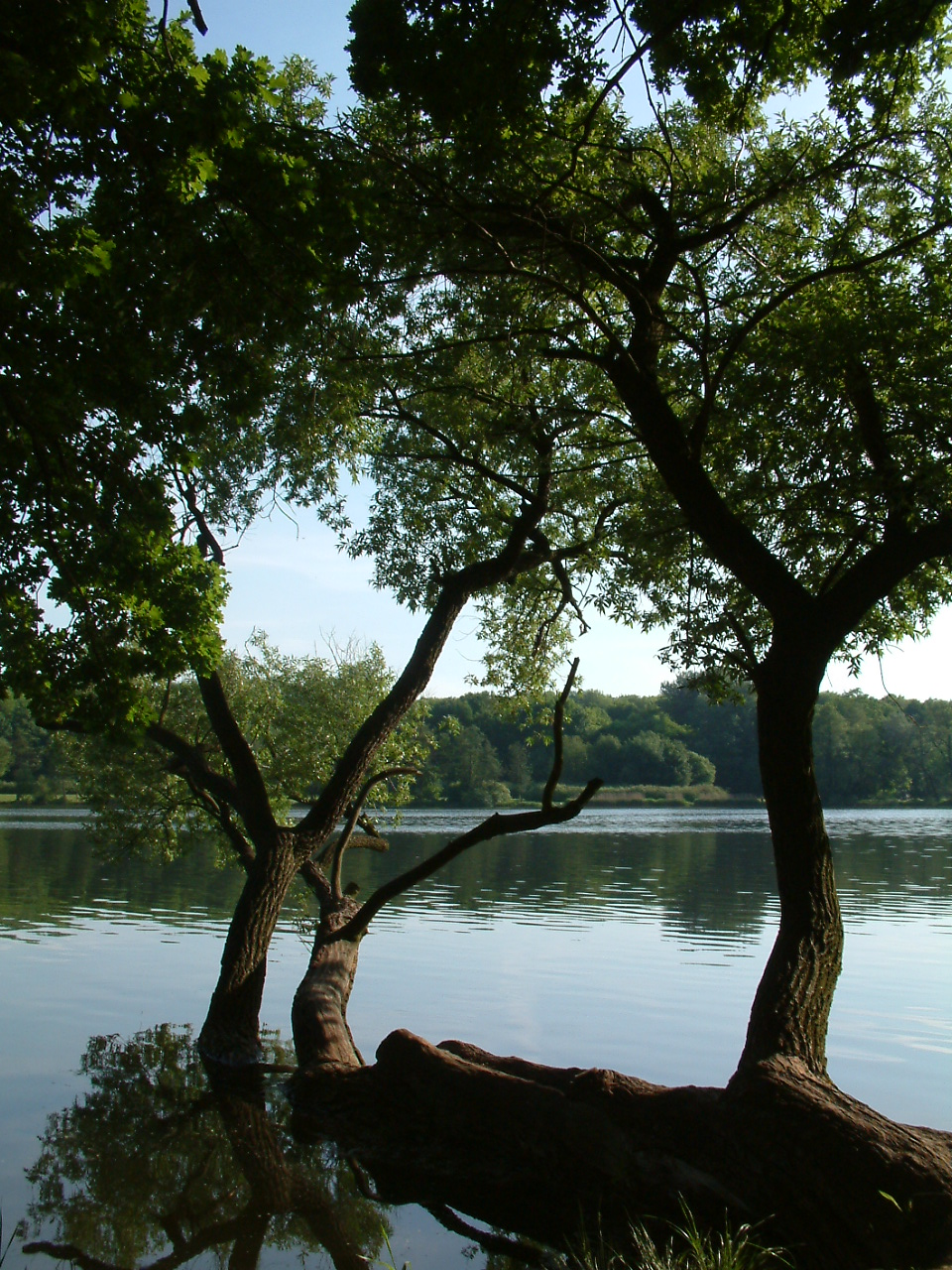
- View from northern shore

- Location within Greater Poland Voivodeship
- Location: Poznań
- Coordinates: 52°25′36″N 16°52′43″E
- Type: artificial lake
- Primary inflows: Bogdanka
- Primary outflows: Bogdanka
- Basin countries: Poland
- Surface area: 36.7 ha (91 acres)
- Max. depth: 9 m (30 ft)
- Settlements: Poznań

Lake Rusałka is an artificial lake in Poznań, Poland. It has an area of 367,000 square metres. It was named after the water nymph Rusalka. It was formed in 1943 as a result of the damming of the Bogdanka River. In 1940 thousands of people were executed in the forests surrounding the lake.

== Gallery ==
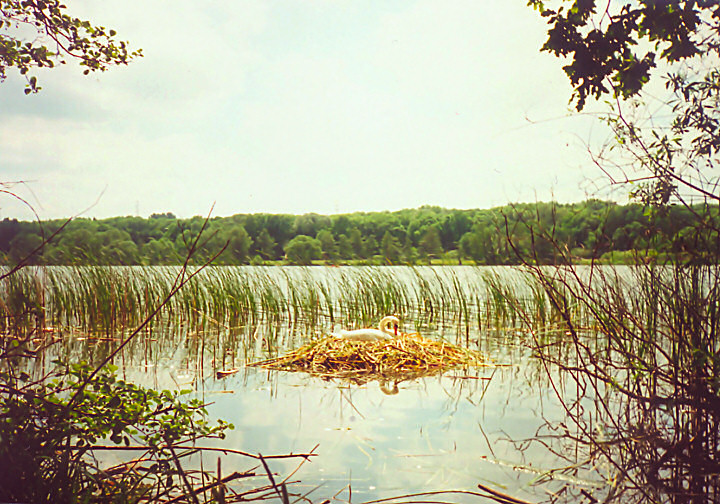

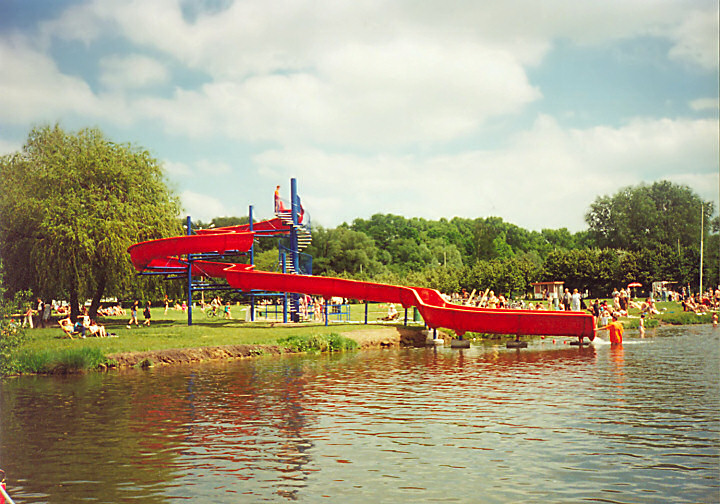

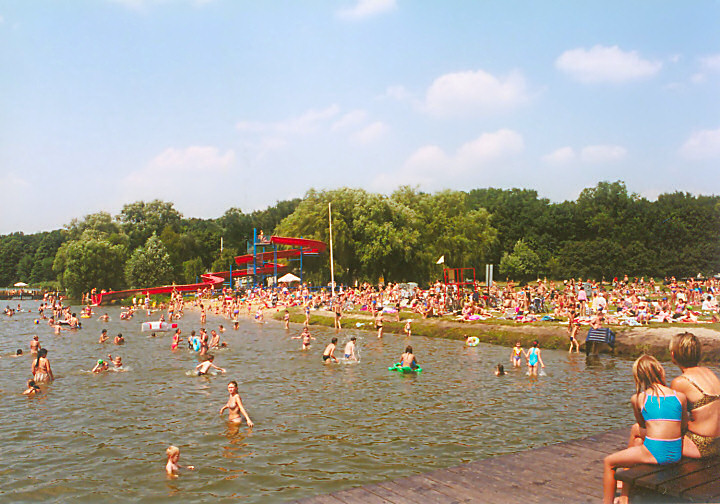
