= Podolany, Poznań =

Podolany
- Neighbourhood
- Bells at Podolany church
- Interactive map of Podolany
- Coordinates: 52°27′25″N 16°53′10″E
- Country: Poland
- Voivodeship: Greater Poland
- City: Poznań
- City district: Jeżyce
- First appearance on map: 1798
- Incorporated into city limits: 1933

Area
  - Total: 5.3 km^{2} (2.0 sq mi)
- Elevation: 85 m (279 ft)

Population (2012)
  - Total: 7,203
  - Density: 1,359.06/km^{2} (3,519.9/sq mi)
- Time zone: UTC+1 (CET)
  - Summer (DST): UTC+2 (CEST)
- Postal code: 60-XXX
- Telephone code: (+48) 61
- Vehicle registration: PO
- SIMC: 0969652
- Website: www.ropodolany.pl

Podolany ([pɔdɔˈlanɨ]; German: Schoenherrnhausen) is a suburban neighbourhood of the city of Poznań in western Poland, located in the north-west of the city.

Podolany was incorporated into the city partly in 1933, and partly under German occupation in 1940–42. It is mainly a residential district, but its southern parts contain industrial sites.

Podolany is one of the 42 osiedles into which Poznań is divided (see Administrative division of Poznań). It is a part of the former wider district of Jeżyce.

Podolany is bounded to the west by the main railway line running northwards towards Piła. In the north-west corner of the district is the station Poznań Strzeszyn (named after Strzeszyn, a neighbourhood further to the west). Podolany is also served by a number of bus routes connecting it with the city centre.
