= Evangelical-Augsburg Chapel, Poznań =

Coordinates: 52°24′05″N 16°53′13″E

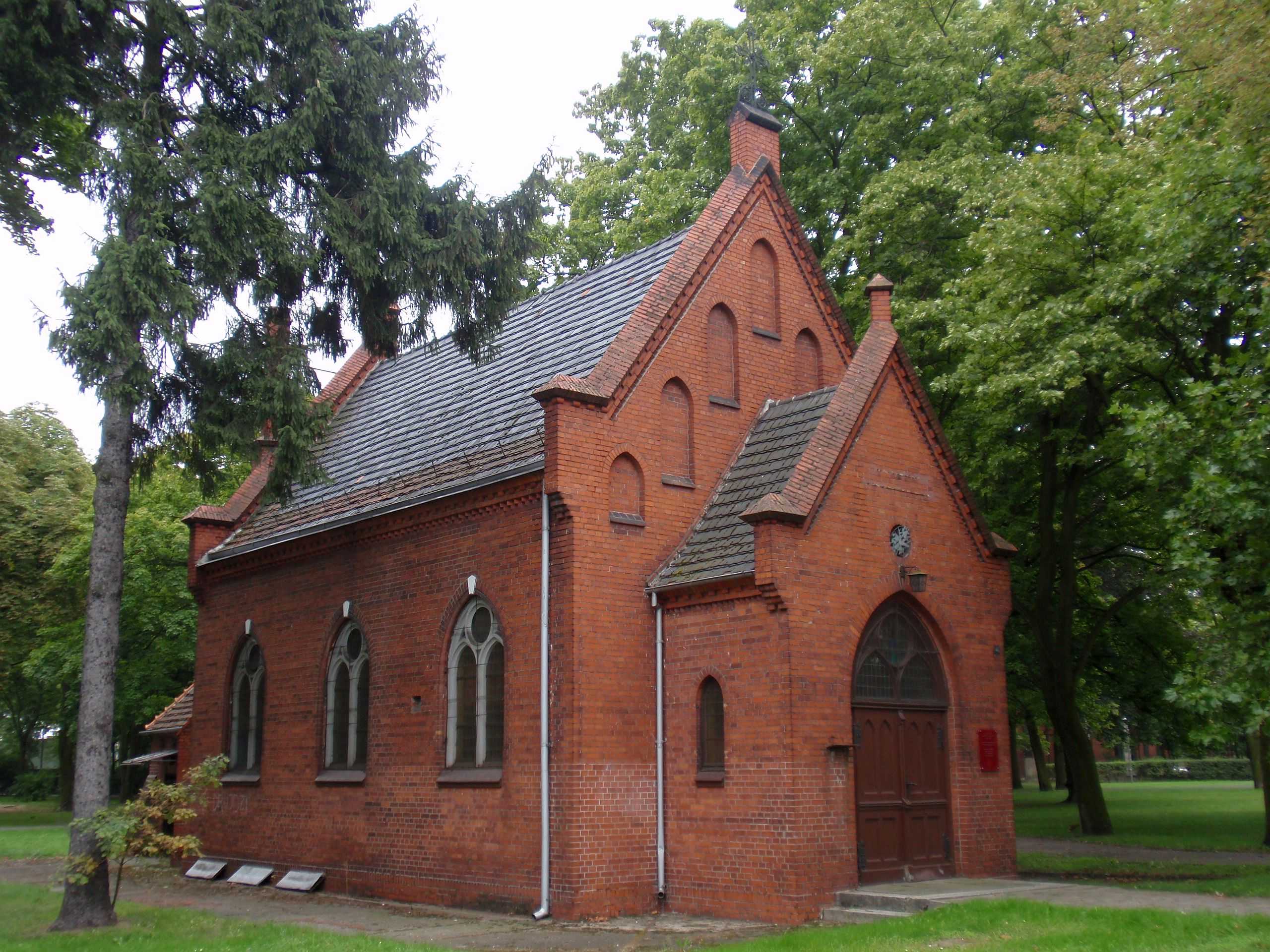
The chapel

Evangelical-Augsburg Chapel in Poznań is a historic building in Manitius Park in Poznań, Poland. It used to be a Protestant chapel at a cemetery.

== History ==
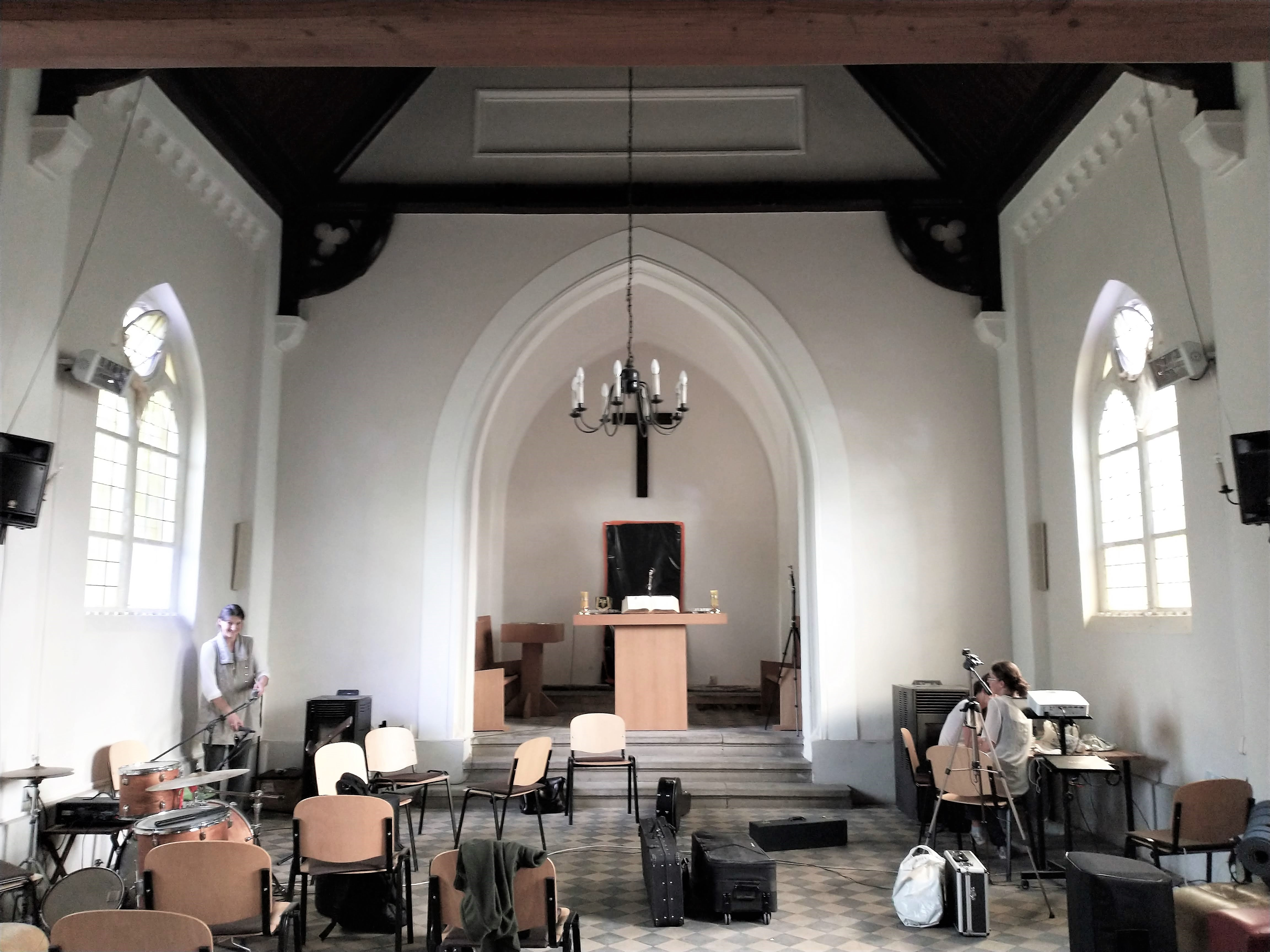
Interior with altar

The chapel was built in 1896 at what was then the Lutheran parish cemetery of St. Paul. When the cemetery was closed in 1946, the municipal authorities allowed the chapel to serve as a temporary place of worship. In 1948, the chapel became the home of the Polish National Church, Nativity of the Blessed Virgin Mary.

Over the years, the local authorities denied all requests to either enlarge the chapel or demolish it. The congregation decided to construct a new church in a different location in the city. The last Sunday service in the chapel took place in 2003.

== Description ==
The chapel is a brick Neo-Gothic building with one nave and a shallow chancel. From the street, the nave is preceded by a vestibule. The choir is covered with a cross vault; the nave has open timbered roof trusses. The interior of the nave is illuminated by the arched window. The chapel originally housed the cemetery morgue, a large arcade in the rear of the present sacristy.

The chapel interior contains furnishings that were recycled from inactive evangelical churches around the province. In 1953, the congregation installed a plaque commemorating minister Gustav Manitius. In 1965 the interior was modernized, new decor was installed in the chancel, and new windows installed. During the 1990s the basement was temporarily adapted to the Salk parish choir with new benches.

After the consecration of the temple of God's grace, moved there as well plaque, while the equipment was transferred to the new evangelical chapel in Pila.

== Gallery ==
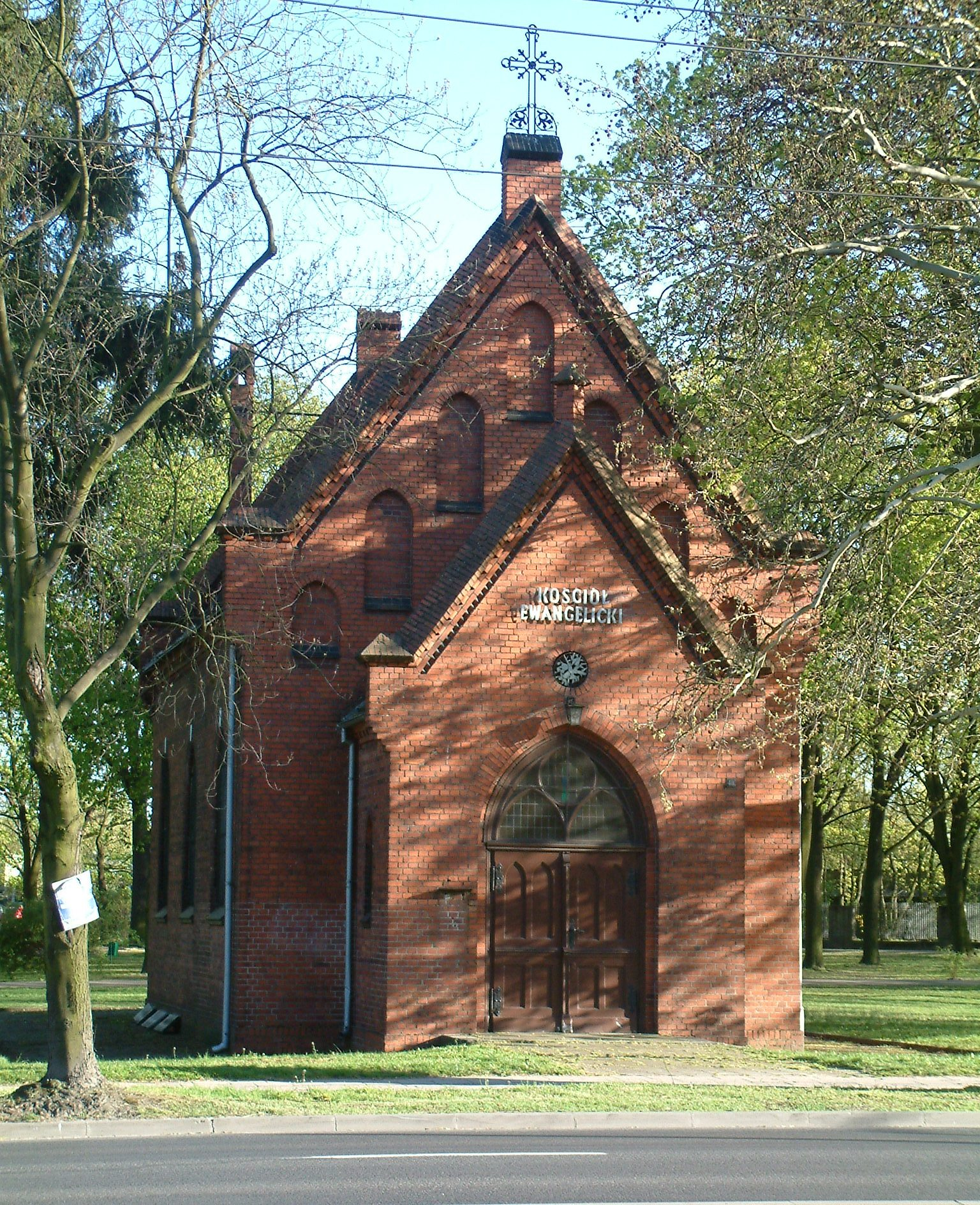
Facade in 2007

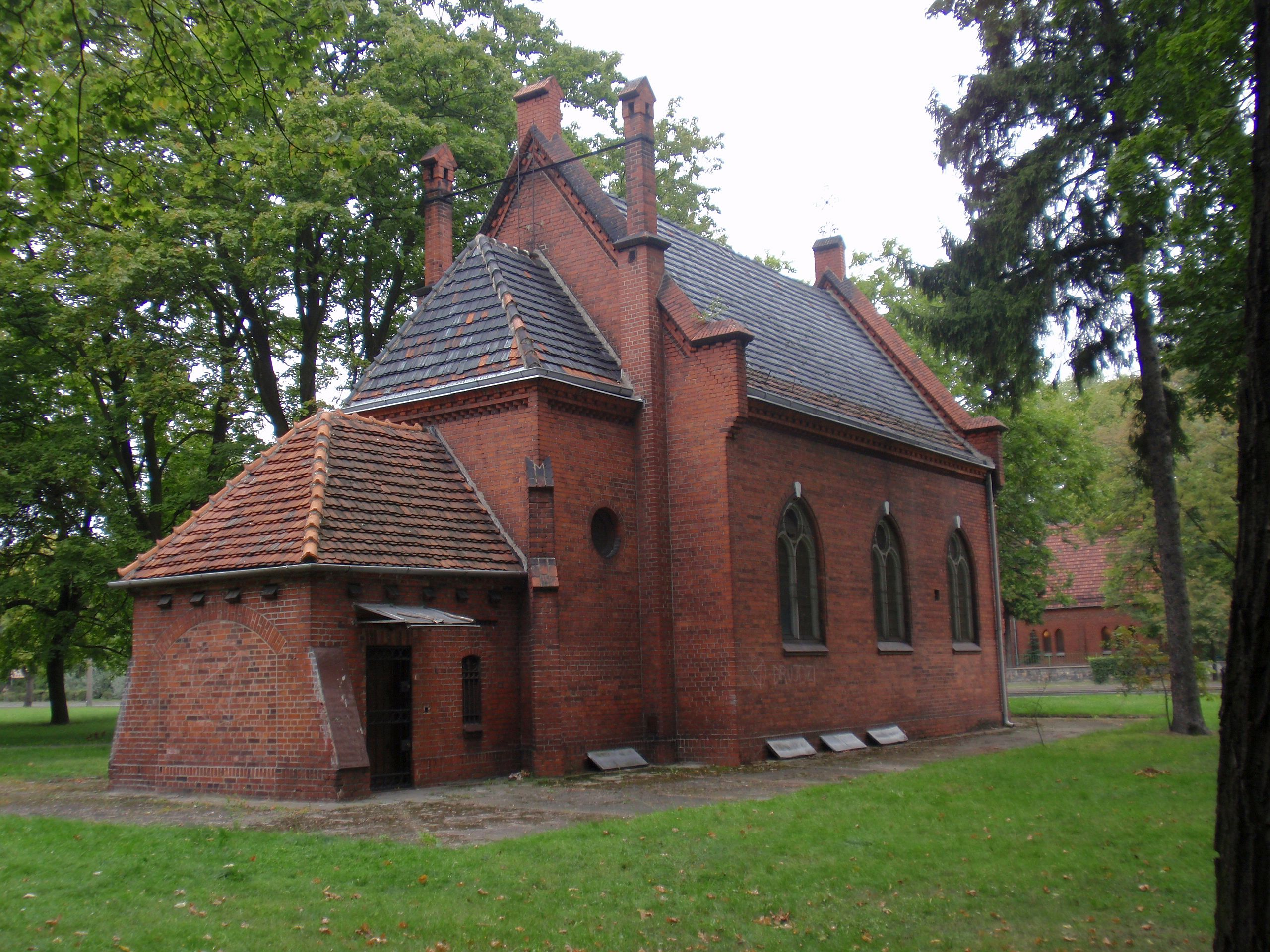
View from the park

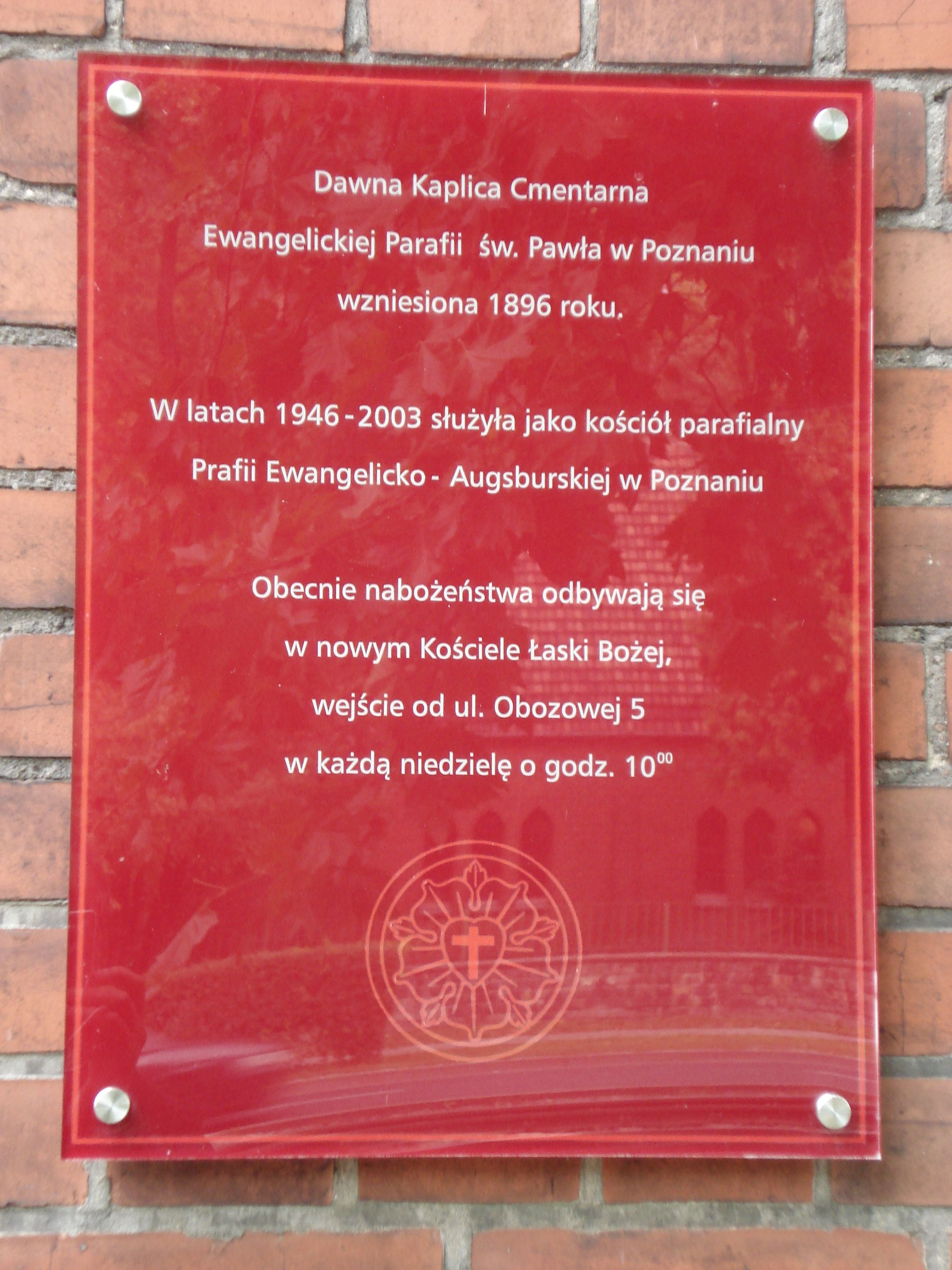
Informational plaque
