= Poznań–Ławica Airport =

Poznań–Ławica Henryk Wieniawski Airport Port Lotniczy Poznań–Ławica im. Henryka Wieniawskiego

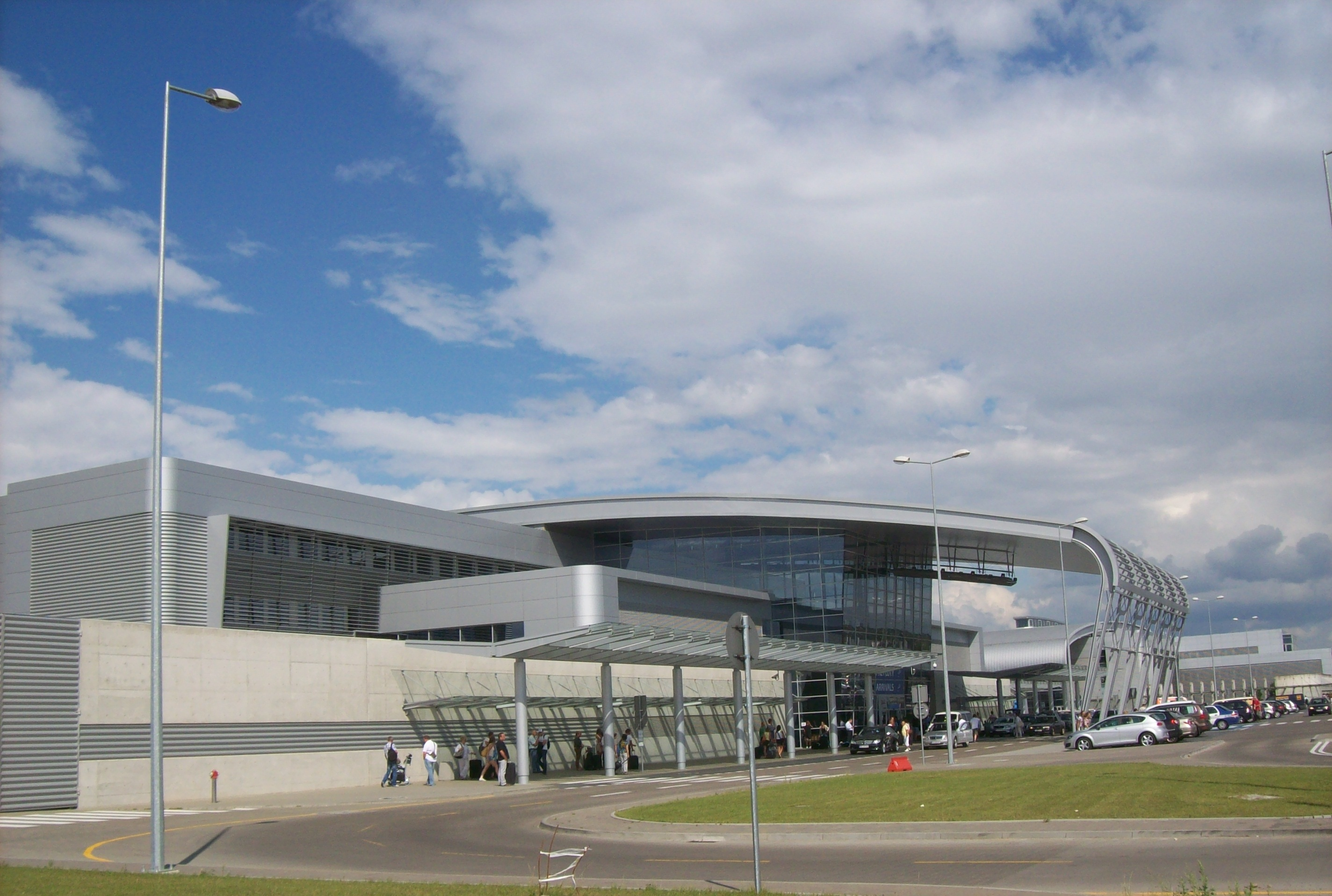
- IATA: POZ; ICAO: EPPO

Summary
- Airport type: Public
- Operator: Poznań Ławica Airport Ltd.
- Serves: Poznań
- Location: Poznań, Poland
- Focus city for: Buzz (Polish airline)
- Elevation AMSL: 94 m (308 ft)
- Coordinates: 52°25′16″N 016°49′35″E
- Website: poznanairport.pl

Map
- Location of airport in Poland

Runways
Direction	Length		Surface
Direction	m	ft	Surface
10/28	2,504	8,215	Asphalt

Statistics (2025)
- Number of passengers: 4,144,827
- Aircraft movements: 44,823
- Source: Polish Poznan Airport at Poznan Airport

Poznań–Ławica Henryk Wieniawski Airport (IATA: POZ, ICAO: EPPO), built in 1913, is one of the oldest airports in Poland. It is located 5 km (3.1 mi) west of Poznań city centre. It takes its name from the neighborhood of Ławica, part of the city's Grunwald district, while the airport actually lies in the Jeżyce district.

== Synopsis ==
The northern section has been used as a military airport since its inception in 1913 as an Imperial German airbase until 23 December 2009. The southern section is used for civilian purposes. The prospect of relocating the airport elsewhere is often raised as a result of the flight path to the runway being located directly over the city.

The airport caters for international, domestic and cargo flights and general aviation. A new terminal was opened in 2012 and can handle up to 3.5 million passengers per year.

== Confusion with Poznań–Krzesiny military airport ==
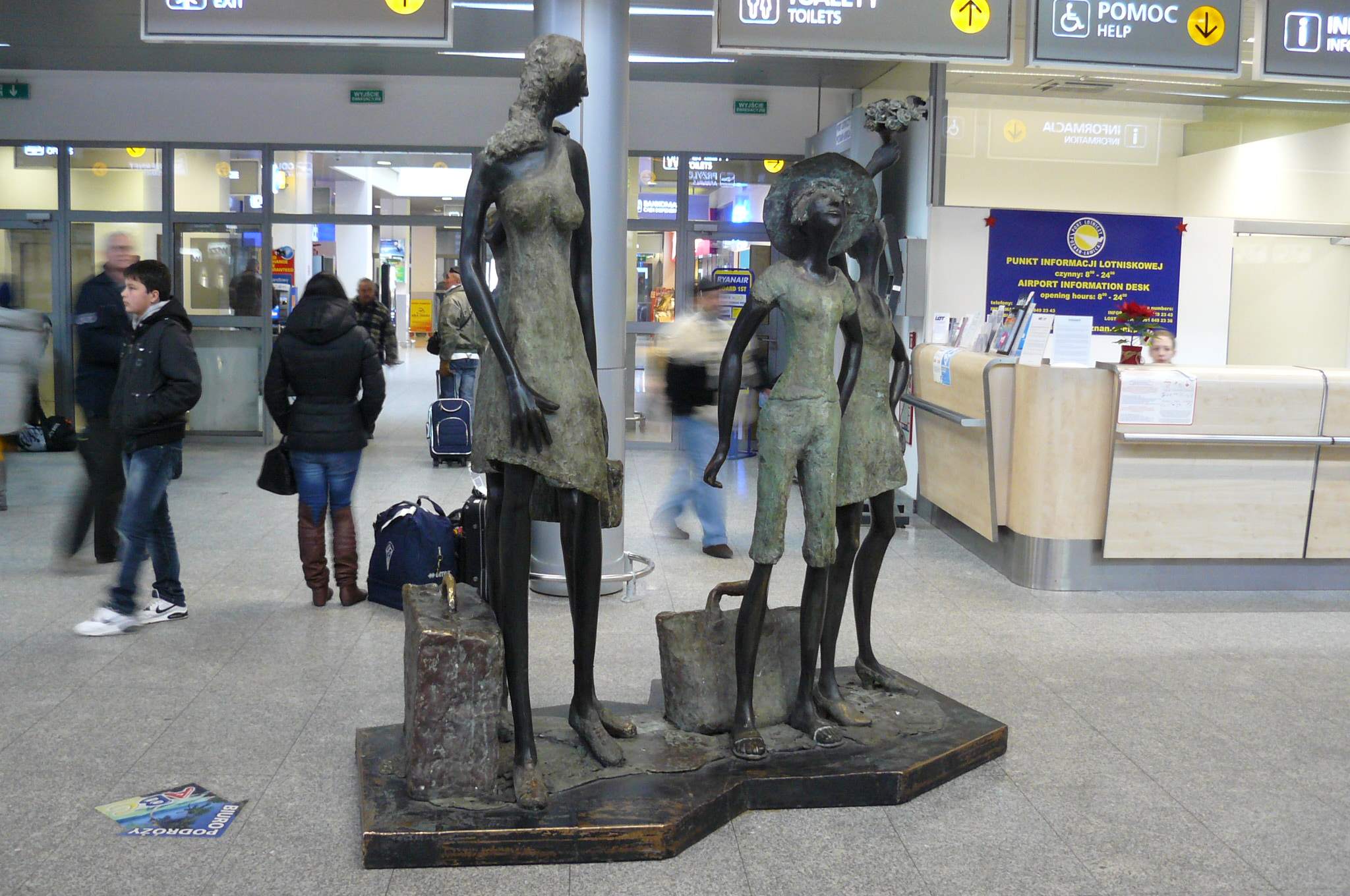
Sculpture at Poznan Airport by Hendryk Bakalarczyk

Poznań–Ławica airport has been confused by pilots with a nearby airbase, Poznań–Krzesiny Airbase (ICAO code: EPKS), which also has a 2,500 m (8,200 ft) runway. The runways are at approximately the same orientation: Ławica's is 11/29 (true heading: 108/288) and Krzesiny's is 12/30 (true heading: 117.9/297.9). The two runways lie in a nearly straight line, with Krzesiny coming up first on approaches from the east, the ones used most often. On the other hand, the Krzesiny airbase has two runways and lies southeast from the city centre, while Poznań–Ławica lies just west of it.

One notable incident involving confusion between Ławica and Krzesiny happened on 15 August 2006, when a Sky Airlines aircraft - a Boeing 737-800 running flight number SKY335 - mistook the runway at Krzesiny for the one being used in Ławica, landing at the military base by accident. The aircraft later took off on a repositioning flight to the correct airfield.

According to Krzysztof Krawcewicz, a pilot and the editor-in-chief of the Polish monthly Przegląd Lotniczy/Aviation Revue, this was at least the seventh mistaken aircraft that landed at the Poznań–Krzesiny airfield in 2006 alone. He faults, among others, the "scandalous procedures which are in use by the air traffic control at Poznań–Ławica" and the lack of radar use in controlling aircraft landing, which, although a radar system is present at Ławica, has been shut off, most likely due to the nearby military base.

== Airlines and destinations ==
The following airlines operate regular scheduled and charter flights at Poznań–Ławica Airport:

== Passenger ==
Airlines	Destinations
AirBaltic	Seasonal: Gran Canaria (begins 26 October 2026)
Swiss	Zurich
Enter Air	Seasonal charter: Antalya, Burgas, Colombo–Bandaranaike, El Alamein, Enfidha, Fuerteventura, Hurghada, Izmir, Marsa Alam, Marsa Matruh, Rhodes, Zanzibar
Flydubai	Dubai–International
KLM	Amsterdam
LOT Polish Airlines	Warsaw–Chopin
Lufthansa	Frankfurt, Munich
Neos	Seasonal charter: Nosy Be
Nouvelair	Djerba, Monastir
Ryanair	Alicante, Birmingham, Bristol, Brussels-Charleroi, Copenhagen, Dublin, Edinburgh, Kraków, Leeds/Bradford, Liverpool, London–Stansted, Málaga, Malta, Manchester, Milan–Bergamo, Oslo–Sandefjord, Paphos, Paris–Beauvais, Prague, Rome–Ciampino, Shannon, Stockholm–Arlanda, Thessaloniki, Tirana, Valencia, Venice-Treviso; Seasonal: Amman–Queen Alia, Bari, Burgas, Cagliari, Chania, Corfu, Dubrovnik, Girona, Lisbon, Palermo, Palma de Mallorca, Podgorica, Pula, Zadar
Scandinavian Airlines	Copenhagen
SkyUp	Seasonal charter: Hurghada, Sharm El Sheikh
Smartwings	Seasonal charter: Bodrum, Chania, Heraklion, Hurghada, Izmir, Rhodes, Thessaloniki, Tirana
Swiss International Air Lines	Zurich
Wizz Air	Basel/Mulhouse, Kutaisi, London–Luton, Podgorica, Rome–Fiumicino; Seasonal: Tirana, Verona
World2Fly	Seasonal charter: Phu Quoc

== Cargo ==
Airlines	Destinations
SprintAir	Cologne/Bonn

== Statistics ==
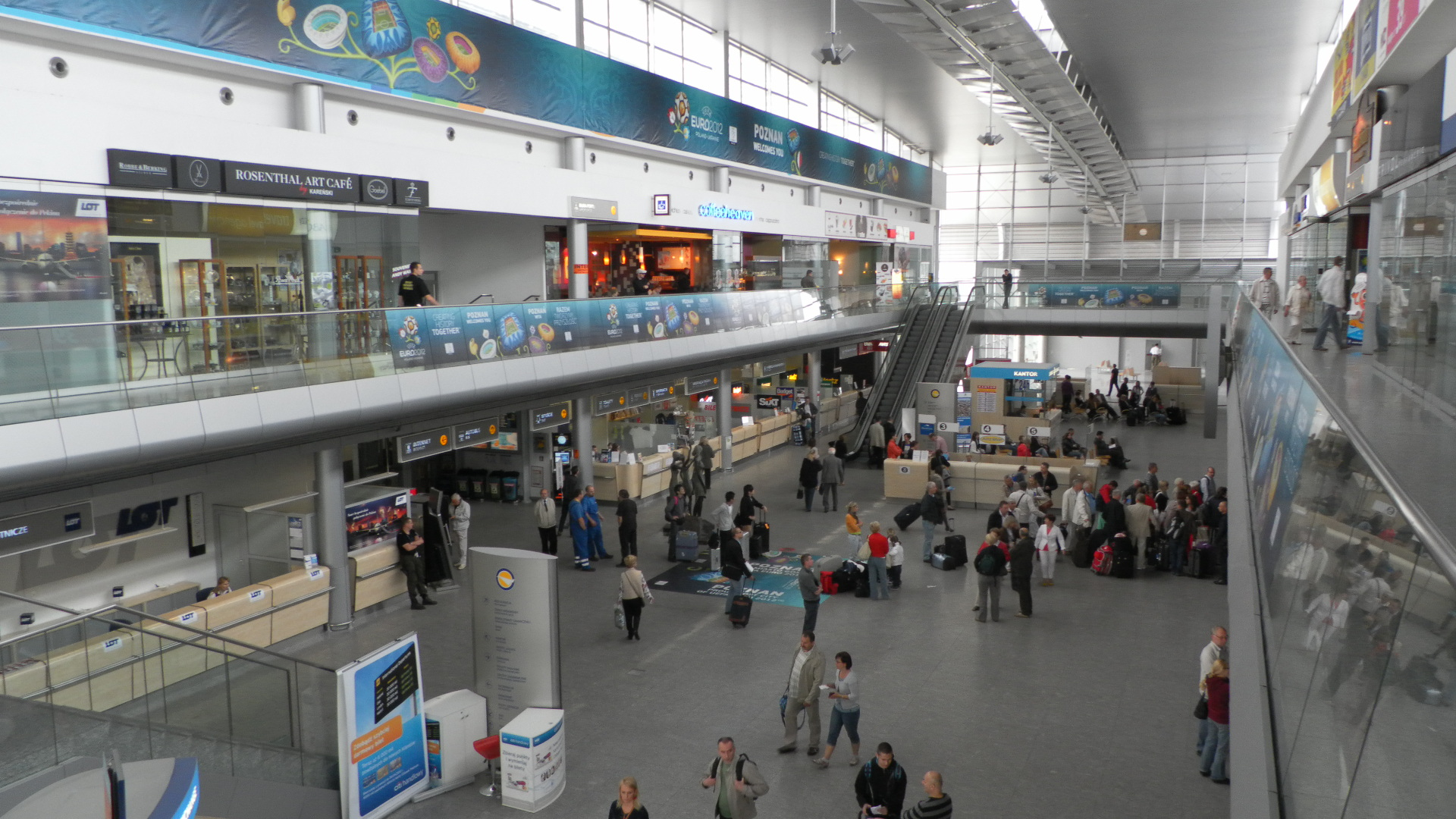
Check-in hall

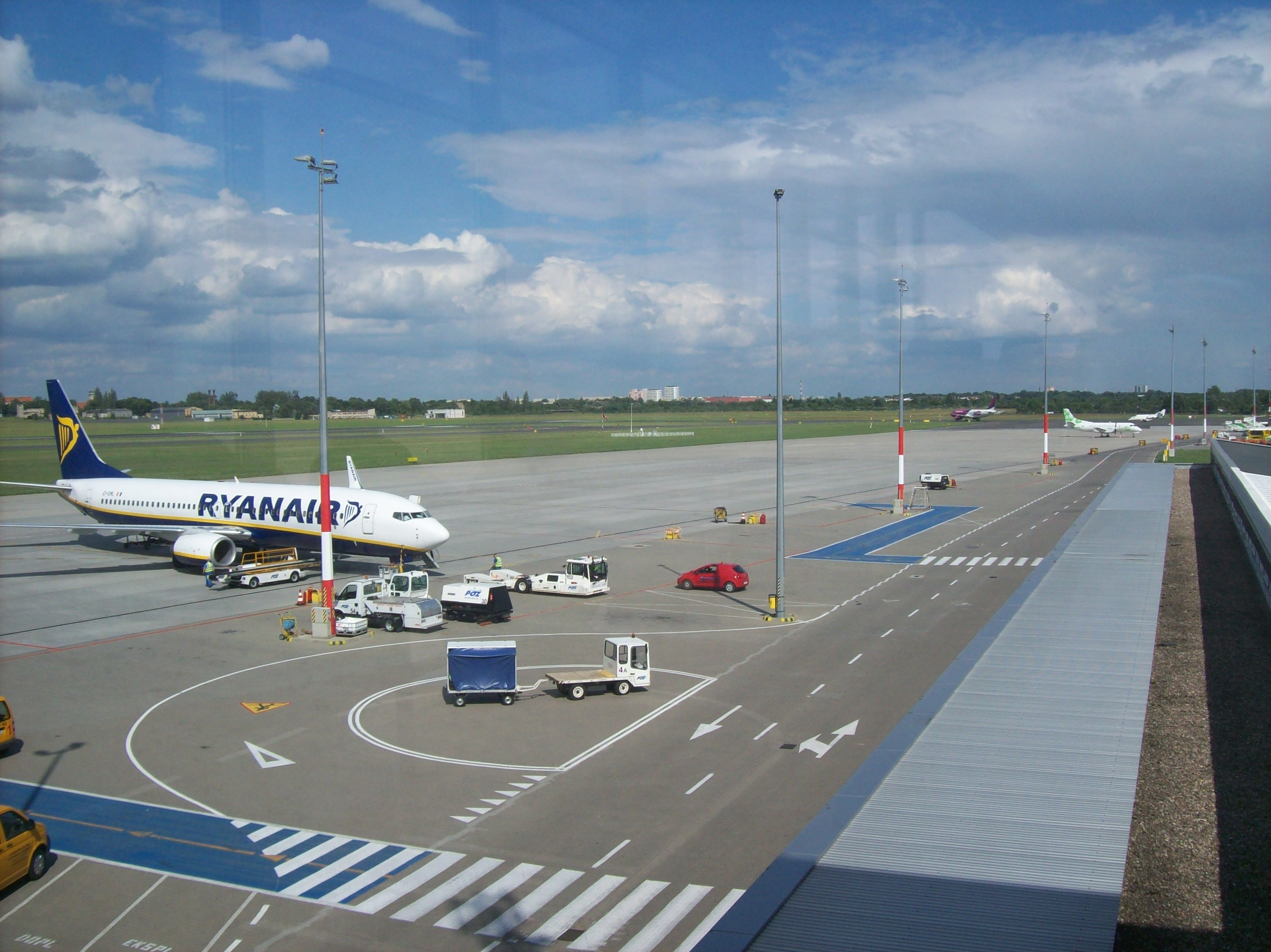
Apron view

Busiest Routes from Poznań Airport (2024)
Rank	Airport	Passengers	Change 2023 / 24
1.	Antalya (AYT)	271,455	▲20,4%
2.	London–Stansted (STN)	175,027	▲11,5%
3.	London–Luton (LTN)	155,513	▲20,0%
4.	Warsaw–Chopin (WAW)	149,827	▲11,2%
5.	Frankfurt (FRA)	129,819	▲10,1%
6.	Munich (MUC)	122,278	▲26,0%
7.	Bergamo (BGY)	107,749	▲64,1%
8.	Hurghada (HRG)	100,542	▲84,3%
9.	Dublin (DUB)	78,146	▲2,9%
10.	Beauvais (BVA)	72,182	▲82,0%

== Incidents and accidents ==
- On 10 June 1952, a Petlyakov Pe-2 bomber from the 21st Reconnaissance Regiment took off from Ławica air base for a training flight, but crashed shortly thereafter near the Warta river as a result of engine failure. The crash killed the bomber's crew: chorąży Zdzisław Lara (pilot), chorąży Stanisław Kuć (navigator) and corporal Józef Bednarek (rear gunner/radio operator), as well as six civilians on the ground. Due to the fact that the aircraft was made in the Soviet Union, the crash was covered up by the Communist authorities and the official reports put the blame on the pilot instead of equipment. In 2008, a monument was unveiled at the crash site.

== Public ground transportation ==
Poznań transit (MPK Poznań) lines number 159 and 222 stop at the arrival area of the airport and provide a connection to Poznań Główny railway station. The trip takes approximately 20 minutes. There is also a bus stop for 148 nearby.

== See also ==
- List of airports in Poland
- Air ambulances in Poland
