= Jeżyce, Poznań =

Neighbourhood of Poznań, Poland

Jeżyce
- Osiedle
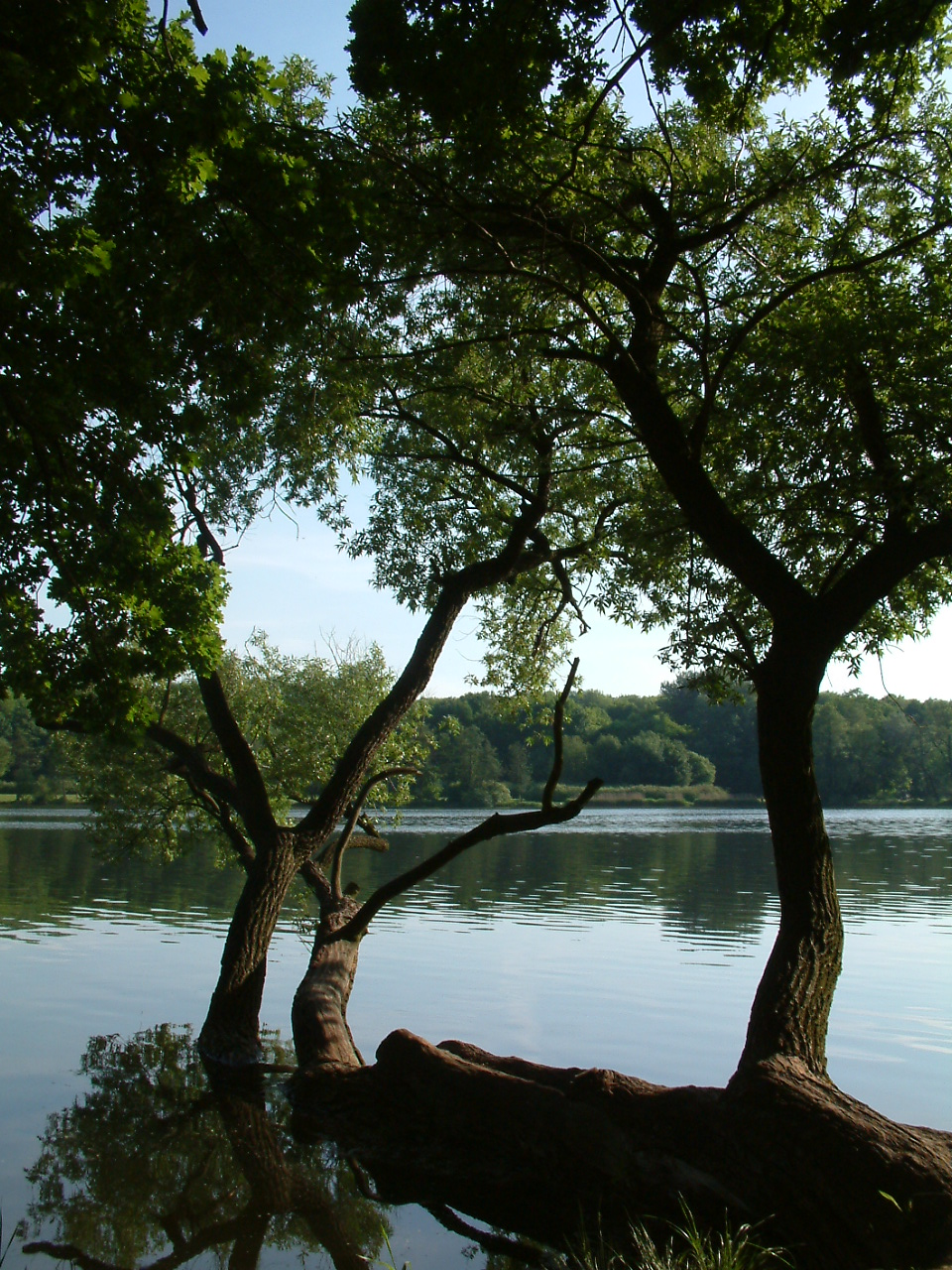
- Lake Rusałka

- Location within Poland
- Coordinates: 52°26′11.33″N 16°50′57.72″E
- Country: Poland
- Voivodeship: Greater Poland
- City: Poznań
- Time zone: UTC+1:00 (CET)
  - Summer (DST): UTC+2:00 (CEST)

Jeżyce [jɛˈʐɨt͡sɛ] is a neighborhood and district in Poznań in western Poland. It was one of the five governmental districts (dzielnicas) into which the city was divided prior to 1990, and which are retained for certain administrative purposes. For details, see Administrative division of Poznań.

The name Jeżyce more popularly refers to a much narrower area: the old neighbourhood (and former village) of Jeżyce, centred on the market (Rynek Jeżycki). This forms the south-eastern part of the wider district of Jeżyce discussed in this article. For the osiedles contained within this district – including one called Jeżyce, which closely corresponds to the old neighbourhood – see Administrative division of Poznań.

The district of Jeżyce covers the north-western part of Poznań, with an area of 57.9 square kilometres (22.4 sq mi), 22% of the city's total area. Its population of 81,300 accounts for 14.2% of the city's total. Its population density is 1,404 people/km^{2}.

Jeżyce is bordered by the districts Stare Miasto to the east and Grunwald to the south. It also borders the administrative districts (gminas) of Suchy Las to the north, Rokietnica and Tarnowo Podgórne to the north-west, and Dopiewo to the west.

== Geography ==
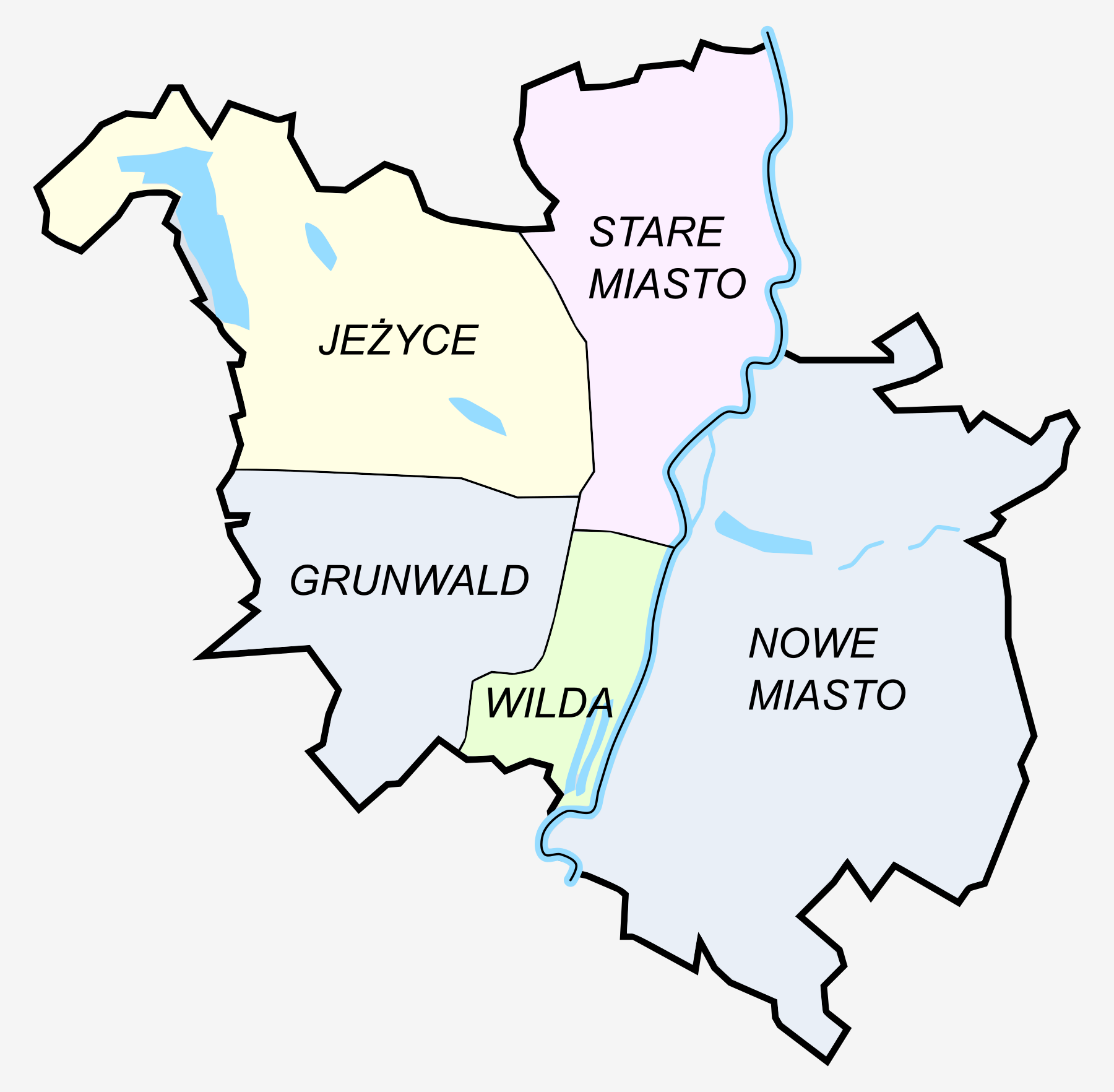
Former division of Poznań into five districts

The boundary between Jeżyce and Stare Miasto was marked by the streets Obornicka (the main road leading north towards Oborniki), Lechicka, Piątkowska, Księcia Mieszka I, Pułaskiego and Roosevelta. The boundary with Grunwald is marked by Bukowska, the road leading from the city centre to the airport and onwards towards Buk.

The old district of Jeżyce is a residential and commercial quarter directly west of the city centre. Its main street is ulica Dąbrowskiego, which is adjacent to the large open-air market called Rynek Jeżycki (Jeżyce Market). Close by on Dąbrowskiego are the Teatr Nowy (New Theatre) and the Rialto cinema.

Onwards from old Jeżyce, Dąbrowskiego continues as the main westerly route out of northern Poznań. It passes through the neighbourhoods of Ogrody ("gardens", named after the city's botanical gardens in the area), Wola, Smochowice, Sytkowo and Krzyżowniki. To the south, between the streets Dąbrowskiego and Bukowska, is Poznań Ławica Airport.

Much of Jeżyce consists of a belt of green land along the Bogdanka stream, which flows through the district from the north-west. It forms a number of lakes, of which the two largest are Strzeszyn Lake (Jezioro Strzeszyńskie) and Lake Rusałka, both popular bathing spots. From Rusałka the Bogdanka continues (partly underground) to Sołacz Park (Park Sołacki), through Urbanowo, and then onwards underground to join the Warta.

North of old Jeżyce is Sołacz, an area with many large houses and the green areas of Sołacz Park. Smaller neighbourhoods in this area include Niestachów, Urbanowo, Wierzbak (a stream called Wierzbak runs underground here, beneath the street Nad Wierzbakiem – "Over the Wierzbak" – to meet the Bogdanka), and Bonin. North of Sołacz is the area known as Winiary. Historically the villages of Winiary were in the area of today's Cytadela and southern Winogrady in Stare Miasto district (the names Winiary and Winogrady derive from the vine cultivation that formerly occurred there) – in the 1830s, because of the Prussian authorities' plans to build fortifications there, the inhabitants were moved to the area now called Winiary.

Between Sołacz and Rusałka lake is the Golęcin area, with the Olimpia complex of sports facilities (including a tennis venue and motorcycle speedway track), and an army training college to the north. North of these areas are the main voivodeship hospital and a Home Ministry hospital, an industrial area, and then the residential districts of Podolany. West of this is the developing neighbourhood of Strzeszyn, and to the north-west the holiday and leisure complex of Strzeszynek next to Strzeszyn Lake.

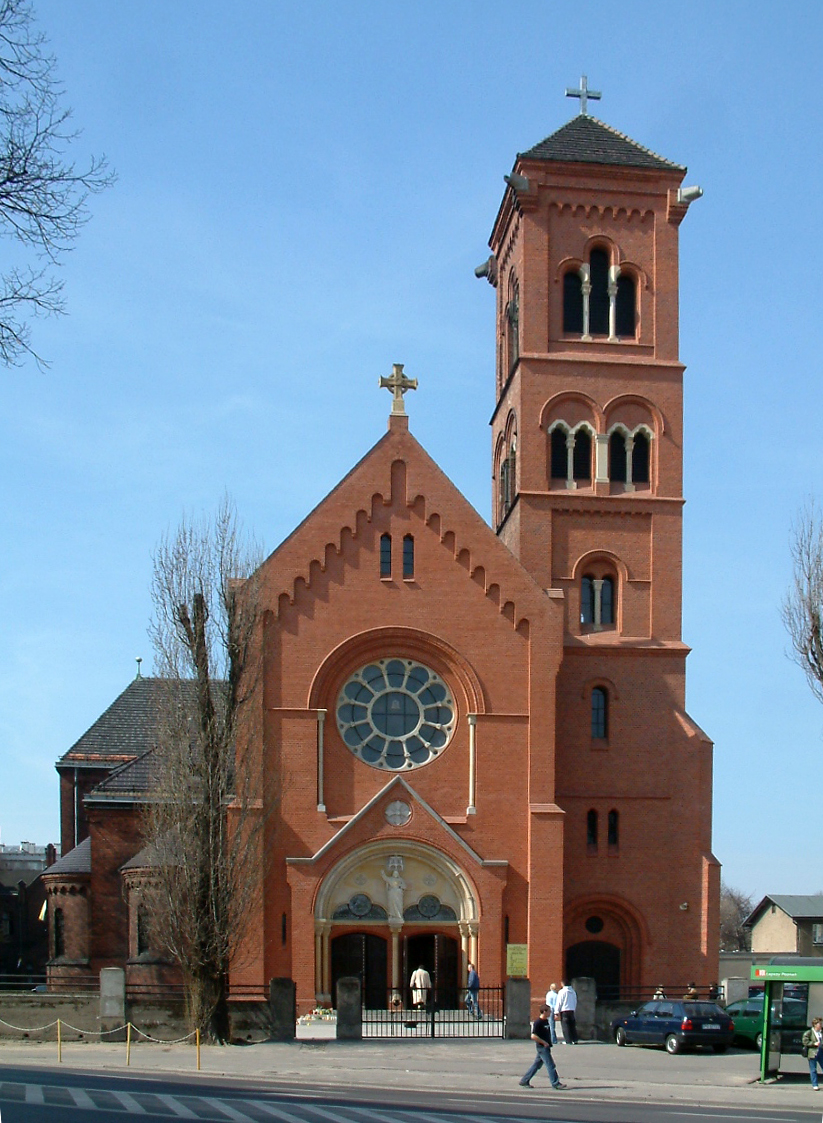
Church of the Sacred Heart of Jesus and St. Florian

In the north-western corner of Jeżyce is Poznań's largest lake, Jezioro Kierskie (Kiekrz Lake), used especially for sailing. North of the lake is the neighbourhood of Kiekrz (partly forming a village outside the city limits). To the east of Kiekrz is a neighbourhood called Psarskie, and to the south-west, on the western side of the lake, is Wielkie, the site of a former State Agricultural Farm.

Other sites of interest in Jeżyce include Poznań's Old Zoo close to the city centre (from which many animals have now been moved to the New Zoo in Nowe Miasto), the tram station on ul. Gajowa, the Church of the Sacred Heart of Jesus and Saint Florian (in old Jeżyce on Koscielna Street), the Wola horse racing track, and the Tor Poznań motor racing track west of the airport.

Trams run through old Jeżyce to Ogrody, and through Sołacz to Winiary. The railway line running north-west from central Poznań passes north of old Jeżyce, dividing into two branches – the line to Piła, which has a station called Poznań Streszyn between Podolany and Strzeszyn, and the more westerly line to Szczecin, which has the stations Poznań Wola and Poznań Kiekrz. Part of Poznań's northern relief line, used for freight transportation, also passes through the district, joining the Szczecin line close to Kiekrz.

== History ==
The old neighbourhood of Jeżyce was a separate village until the expansion of the city's boundaries in 1900 (when the region was still under Prussian rule). Sołacz was added in 1907. Golęcin and south-eastern Podolany became part of the city in 1933, during the Second Polish Republic. Most of the remainder of the district, including Ławica and Strzeszyn, was incorporated into the city during the expansions carried out under Nazi occupation in 1940–1942. Names used for parts of the district under German occupation include Jersitz (Jeżyce), Golnau (Golęcin), Sedan (Strzeszynek) and Steineck (Ławica).

Kiekrz Lake, together with the neighbourhoods of Kiekrz and Wielkie on its northern edge, were brought within Poznań's city boundaries in 1987.

== In culture ==
Jeżyce gave its name to the popular book series by Małgorzata Musierowicz, Jeżycjada. The term was coined by professor Zbigniew Raszewski, himself a series' fan, as a tribute to the Homer's Iliad (Iliada in Polish). The main characters of the series – Borejko family – live in tenement number 5 on Roosevelt's Street in said district. While the characters are fictional, most of the places in the books are real (not excluding the tenement, which is often visited by the books' fans).

== Bibliography ==
- Ludność. Stan i struktura w przekroju terytorialnym (Stan w dniu 31 XII 2009 r.) (PDF) (in Polish). Warszawa: Główny Urząd Statystyczny. 2010-06-11. ISSN 1734-6118.
- Uchwała nr 53 Rady Ministrów z dnia 30 marca 1984 r. w sprawie podziału miasta Poznania na dzielnice (in Polish). Vol. 68. Monitor Polski. 1984.
- Uchwała nr 666 Prezydium Rządu z dnia 7 października 1954 r. w sprawie podziału na dzielnice miasta Poznania (in Polish). Vol. 1547. Monitor Polski. 1954.
- Uchwała nr XVII/145/86 Wojewódzkiej Rady Narodowej w Poznaniu z dnia 29 grudnia 1986 r. (in Polish). Vol. 278. Monitor Polski. 1986.
- Uchwała Nr XXIII/131/84 Wojewódzkiej Rady Narodowej w Poznaniu z dnia 23 lutego 1984 r. ws. podziału miasta Poznania na dzielnice (in Polish). 1984.
- Urząd Miasta. Polskapresse. 16 November 2016.
