= Świerczewo, Poznań =

Coordinates: 52°22′06″N 16°53′00″E

Świerczewo
- Neighborhood of Poznań
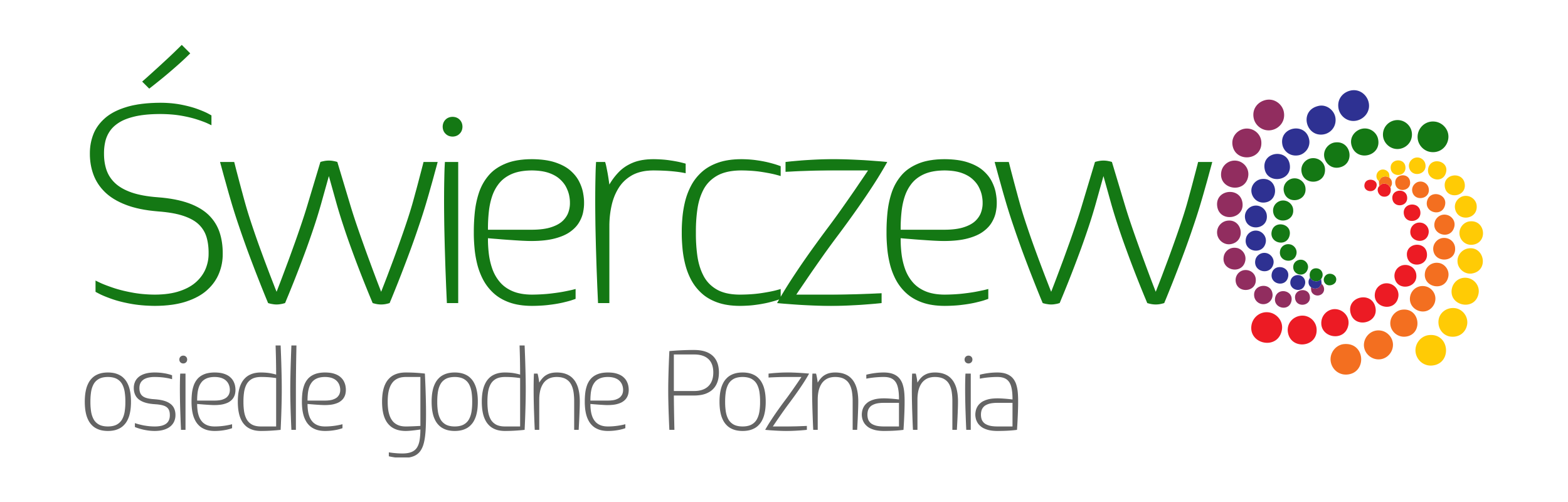
- Logo
- Interactive map of Świerczewo
- Country: Poland
- Voivodeship: Greater Poland
- City county: Poznań
- First mentioned: 13th century
- Incorporated into Poznań: April 1, 1940; 86 years ago

Area
  - Total: 3.94 km^{2} (1.52 sq mi)
- Elevation: 65 m (213 ft)

Population (2016)
  - Total: 13,421
  - Density: 3,410/km^{2} (8,820/sq mi)
- Area code: (+48) 61
- Vehicle registration: PO, PY

Świerczewo is a municipal neighborhood of the city of Poznań, Poland.
