= Kiekrz, Poznań =

Kiekrz
- Administrative unit
- Coat of arms

- Location within Poland
- Coordinates: 52°29′N 16°52′E
- Country: Poland
- Voivodeship: Greater Poland
- County: Poznań County
- Established: 14th century

Area
  - Total: 10 km^{2} (3.9 sq mi)

Population (2010)
  - Total: 1,716
  - Density: 170/km^{2} (440/sq mi)
- Time zone: UTC+1 (CET)
  - Summer (DST): UTC+2 (CEST)
- Area code: +48 61
- Car plates: PO
- Website: www.kiekrz.pl http://parafia-kiekrz.pl/

Kiekrz [kʲɛkʂ] is part of the city of Poznań in western Poland, situated on the northwest edge of the city, adjoining Kierskie Lake. It has several holiday sites and sailing clubs, and a significant number of mainly detached houses. Kiekrz is one of the 42 neighbourhoods into which Poznań is divided for local government purposes.

== Etymology ==
The town's name has been attributed by ornithologists to the sounds the local birds make. The name of the town was first documented in 1386 and was recorded as Kerz. The current name was only given in 1524.

== History ==
=== Early history ===
Humans probably appeared around the Kierskie Lakes approximately eight thousand years ago. The origin of the settlement are unknown. It is possible that between the 12th and 13th centuries the dukes of Greater Poland granted Kiekrz to the Nałęcze family.

The first residents of Kiekrz were the Nałęcze, Łodziowie and Lubowie families. By the 15th century the only family still residing there was the Lubowie family, who over time adopted the name of Kierscy from the name of the town.

=== Prussian and German occupation ===
In 1793, as a result of the Second Partition of Poland, Kiekrz fell under Prussian rule. After signing the Treaty of Tilsit in 1807, Napoleon created the Duchy of Warsaw in whose borders Kiekrz found itself. The defeat of Napoleon and later the provisions of the Congress of Vienna caused Kiekrz to fall under the jurisdiction of the King of Prussia as part of the Grand Duchy of Poznań in 1815, where it remained until the 1850s.

The later owners of Kiekrz, until Poland regained independence, were Germans. It became German property thanks to the actions of the Prussian Settlement Commission.

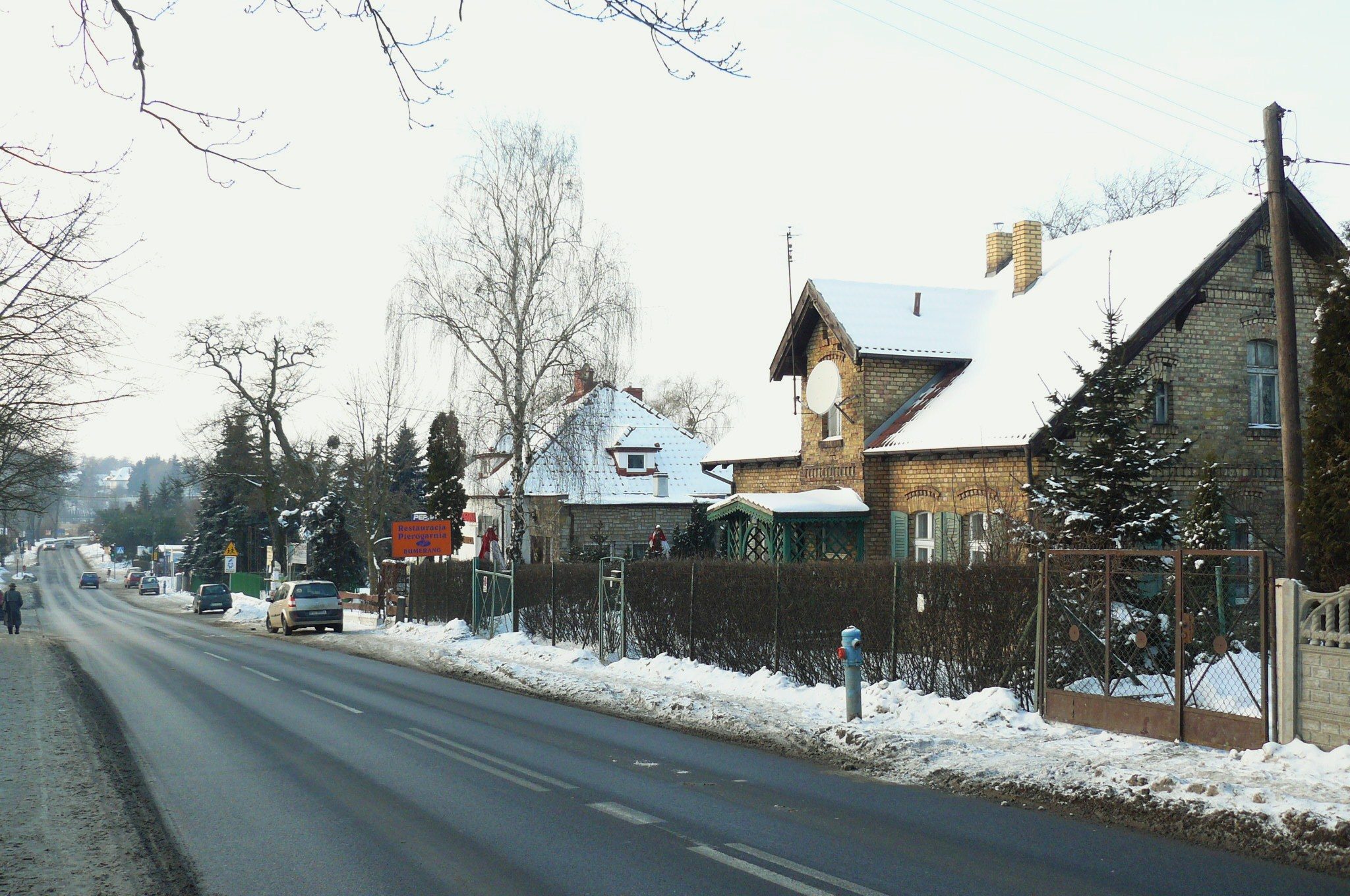
Kiekrz Main Street, Chojnicka

During the First World War much of the local male population was drafted into the German army. This resulted in a severe drop in the local level of education as the number of students at the local schools diminished.

=== Interwar period ===
At the end of World War I Kiekrz along with the villages on the north-western shore of the lake became part of Gmina Rokietnica. The local people of Kiekrz were not noted as having taken part in the Greater Poland Uprising.

=== World War II ===
The Wehrmacht entered Kiekrz without fighting in 1939 and Kiekrz became part of the Reichsgau Wartheland.

The Polish school in Kiekrz was shut down and the Nazi authorities created a German school in the old Evangelical school.

The Nazis displaced part of the locals and tried to eradicate local culture. The local population was often beaten for no reason and forced to work on the local estate.

Kiekrz, which had never before had a Jewish population, now housed two Nazi prisons for Jewish people, one for men and one for women.

The Nazis devastated local religious symbols, cutting down crosses and vandalising shrines, statues and other crosses, which later began disappearing. Some of these were taken by the locals for safekeeping and then returned after the war.

The Red Army entered Kiekrz at the end of January 1945. The general of the division of the Red Army that entered Kiekrz organised a meeting to appoint a local militia. The image of Kiekrz in February 1945 was a saddening one with huge losses caused by the Nazi occupation.

=== Modern history ===
On 1 January 1987 part of the village of Kiekrz (550.4 acres) and part of the Wielkie village (741.44 acres), from Gmina Rokietnica became part of Poznań. The rest of the village remains in the borders of Gmina Rokietnica and is an autonomous sołectwo. Kiekrz was part of the Jeżyce district of Poznań between 1987 and 1990. An auxiliary unit of the city, the Osiedle Poznań-Kiekrz was created in 1992. On 1 January 2011 the borders of the Kiekrz Housing Estate were changed according to the 2010 Poznań reform of auxiliary units.

== Parish church ==
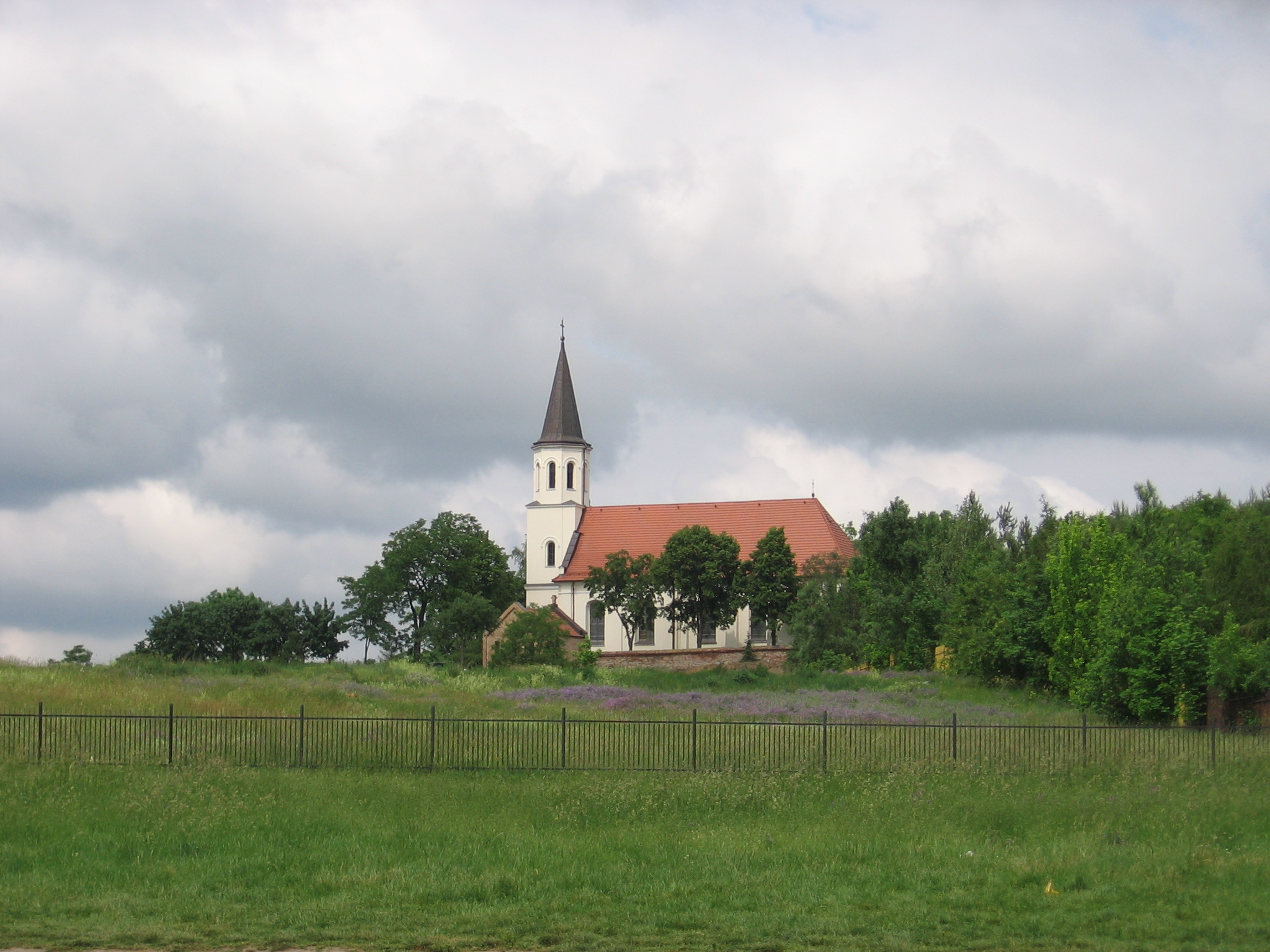
Kiekrz Parish Church of St. Michael the Archangel and Assumption of the Blessed Virgin Mary

The former village church (St. Michael the Archangel and Assumption of the Blessed Virgin Mary) is located in the centre; its provost is the Rev. Rafał Krakowiak.

=== History of the parish church ===
The parish church's origin lies either in the twelfth or thirteenth century. The first documented record comes from the year 1397, which mentions a "Provost Paweł from Kiekrz". The original church of St. Michael, built on the highest point in Kiekrz (92.7 metres above sea level), was made out of wood. Parish documents that survive to this day begin in 1407.

At the end of the sixteenth century the local landowners, the Kierscy family, built a brick church consecrated by Bishop Suffragan of Poznań in the year 1591, as the church of St. Michael the Archangel and Assumption of the Blessed Virgin Mary.

Two centuries later, in the seventeenth century, Maria Kierska, Chatelaine of Rogoźno, expanded the church to its current size. The development was finished in 1770. The tower fell in 1854 and was later rebuilt in 1863.

The church is built in the baroque style and the interior in the rococo style. A painting of St. Michael (original by Raphael), the patron saint of the parish, adorns the altar. Two figures of the archangels Raphael and Gabriel stand on either side of the altar. A painting of the Holy Family and that of Anthony of Padua (eighteenth century) adorn the walls of the presbytery. The side altars feature paintings of the Assumption of Mary and St. John of Nepomuk (eighteenth century).

During the last war the church was closed and converted into an arsenal. All of the church's equipment was stolen by the Nazis. The church was restored in 1947. The church bells were consecrated on 28 September 1947 which were moved from a temporary bell tower to the church tower in 1964.

== Kiekrz Manor ==
The original manor was probably built in the fifteenth or sixteenth century. The only remaining part of the original Kiekrz Manor from before the demolition is the outbuilding from the eighteenth century. The manor was rebuilt in the first half of the nineteenth century and later in the 1970s. It is a brick building one-storeyed house, with a basement and an attic with a steep hip roof with dormers. The outbuilding was originally covered with shingle. The building now houses the office of the Rehabilitation Hospital for Children.

The park together with the buildings according to records of the land is located on two plots numbered 437 and 417. The first consists of 14.16 acres and the second of 0.59 acres, which gives a total area of 14.75 acres.

=== History of the manor ===
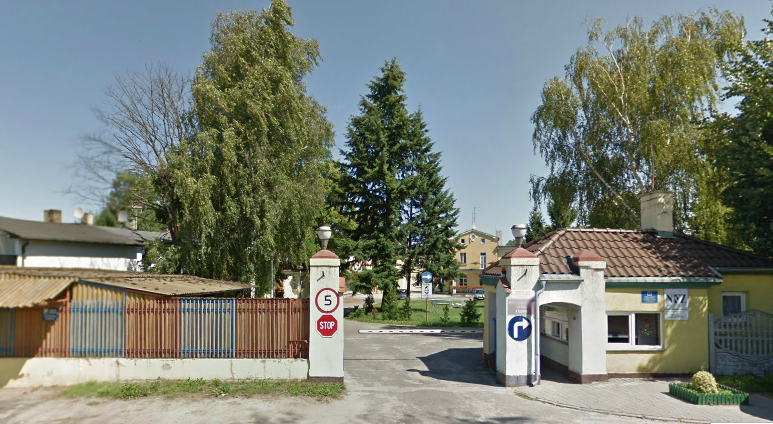
Former Kiekrz manor, now sanatorium

The Kierscy family owned a manor house and folwark in 1524. Their estate consisted of fields, forests, the lake and a small river known then as the Ford (Bród). In 1523 Jan Kierski bequeathed half the village with the manor house, folwark, house and part of the lake (probably the Great Kierskie Lake) to his wife.

The last German owner of the estate was K. Iffland, who, after the Greater Poland Uprising left Poland and in 1921 gave the properties back to the Poles. The estate belonged to General Aleksander Boruszczak for a short while. He repurchased the park – kept in good shape – with the square, buildings and orchard. One can therefore assume that the Kiekrz Park, now the property of the Rehabilitation Hospital for Children, owes its current appearance to its German owners. Boruszczak's successor was Dr Zygmunt Kamiński.

The last private owner was Władysław Ciechanowski. The Ciechanowscy family funded a shrine in honour of the Virgin Mary by a special path in the park. A memorial plaque and a figure of the Immaculate Virgin Mary were placed on its plinth. In 1928 the Ciechanowscy family sold the mansion and the surrounding estate to the health maintenance organization of the city of Poznań. The city rebuilt the mansion between 1928 and 1931, adding extensions among other things. Since then, summer camps for children have been organised there. Since 1931 the form of recreation has been health-school camps open all year round. Seasons last for three months and were for malnourished children and those threatened by tuberculosis. About a hundred patients stayed there during a single season.

In 1934 the entire structure and the park became the property of the Social Insurance Institution. A preventorium for children was then built there which functioned until the outbreak of World War II.

On the eve of the German aggression the preventorium was adapted as a military hospital. The Polish Army did not get the chance to use it, because German forces entered Kiekrz without fighting in the first days of September.

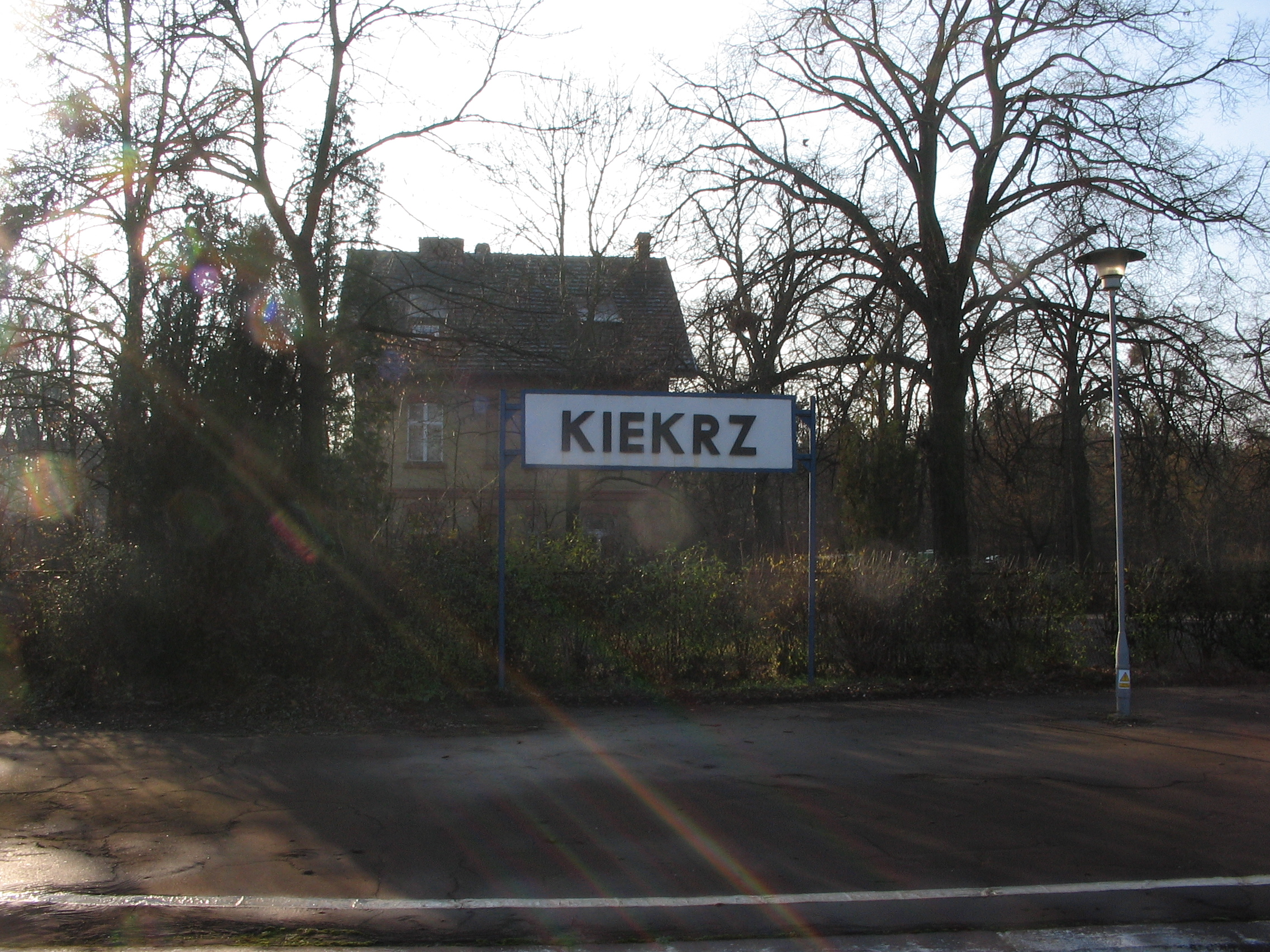
Kiekrz Station name

During the occupation of Poland, Kiekrz (being part of Greater Poland) was incorporated into the Reich. The Warthegau was to be Germanised within ten years. The Nazis began devastating religious symbols in autumn 1939. Over the years of the war the shrines, figures and crosses began disappearing. The same fate befell the shrine of the Immaculate Virgin Mary. The preventorium was seized by the Landesversicherungsanstalt, which handed it on to the Nazi Party. Initially it was the seat of the Hitler Youth. Around 190 young Germans stayed there between the years of fourteen and eighteen. In 1943 the building was converted into the Institution for Osteo-Articular Tuberculosis for German children. It remained in this state until the end of the war.

The Red Army entered Kiekrz between January and February in 1945. The commander of the Soviet squad was stationed, for a while, in the Institution of Tuberculosis. In February 1945 the Urban Social Committee in Poznań turned the pre-war preventorium into an orphanage. It was occupied by around forty Polish children who had lost their parents in the war.

As of a 1 January 1950 decision of the Ministry of Health, the State Sanatorium Against Tuberculosis in Kiekrz was created, which could house 150 patients. Four branches were operated, including one for quarantine. The facility operated in this capacity until 1967. From 1952 to 1961 the director of the centre was Dr Stanisław Bieniek. The facility was then expanded. The dormer part of the sanatorium (the oldest part, from 1909) was expanded by a floor and the two side pavilions were connected to the main structure. In 1961 Dr Lucyna Łuczak became the new director. Carpentry workshops were added and the stores and the piggery were rebuilt. In 1963 a fence was made out of concrete slabs.

The park was renovated between 1964 and 1966 and lighting was also added to it. The sanatorium owned a small holding where pigs were kept for the nutritional requirements of the patients and staff.

In April 1967, due to the reduction in cases of tuberculosis and the rapid development of rehabilitation, the centre was transformed into the Rehabilitation Hospital for Children in Kiekrz, where the rehabilitation of musculoskeletal disorders began. Dr Konstanty Piechocki became its director.

== Landscape park ==
The landscape park – with an extensive clearing in the middle on the slopes, on which old isolated trees grow – was renewed circa 1900. This is evidenced by old trees, whose age is estimated at 90–100 years. The park probably also existed as part of the old manor and outbuildings in the second half of the nineteenth century. The only remains as of today are isolated trees. The park also has younger trees, planted between 1963 and 1967 and self-seeded trees.

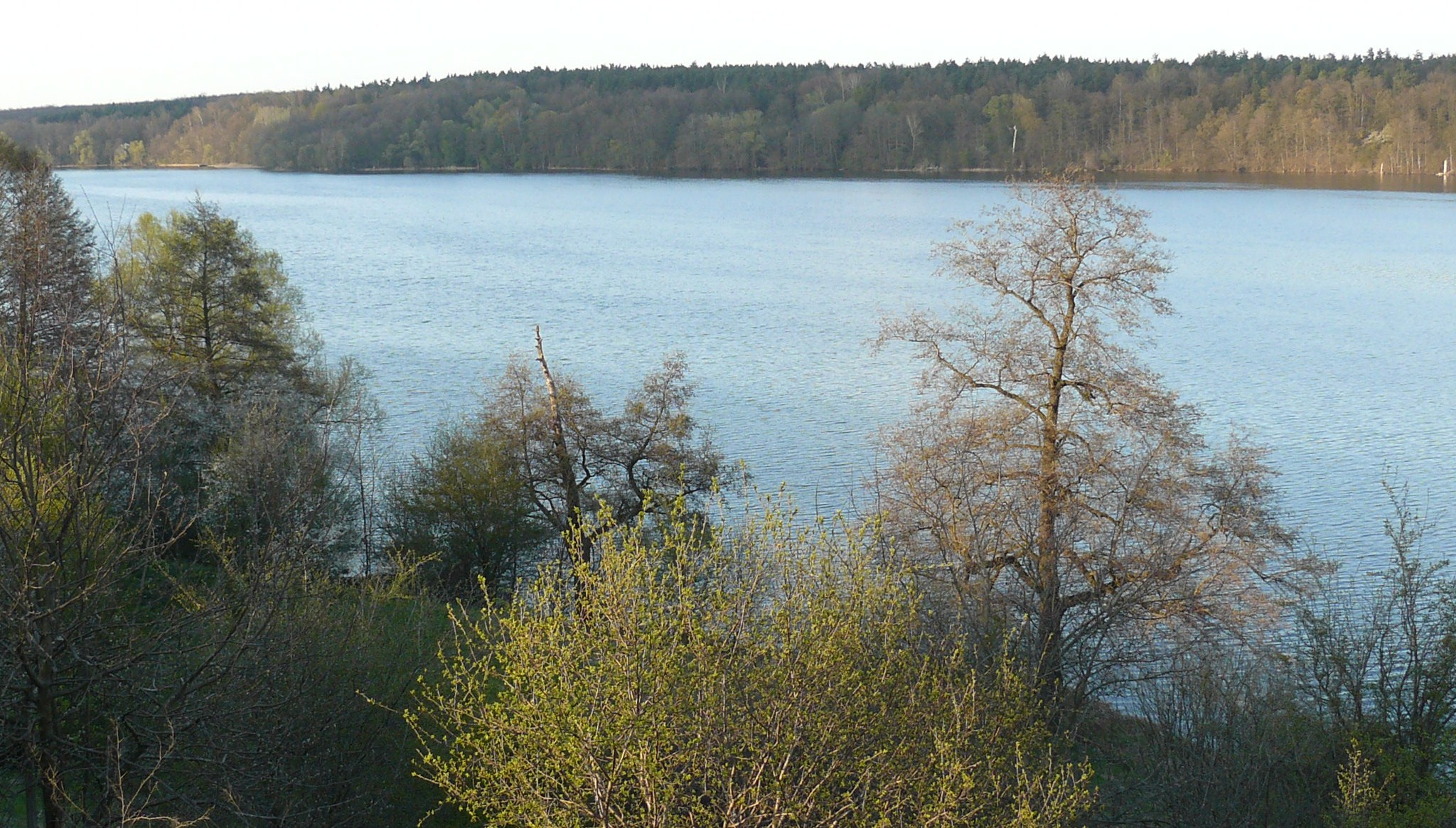
Great Kierskie Lake

== Great Kierskie Lake ==
The Great Kierskie Lake (Wielkie Jezioro Kierskie) is a glacial ribbon lake, located in the western part of Poznań. It is the largest water reservoir in the city and one of the largest in Greater Poland. The lake lies in the Poznań Lake District.

The lake lies on in the western, Golęcin green belt. The size, according to various sources, is from 704.25 acres through 711.91 acres to 766.03 acres. The water table is located at 72 or 71.9 metres above sea level. The average depth of the lake, according to various sources, is from 10.1 metres through 10.8 metres to 11 metres and the maximum depth is from 34,1 metres through 36,0 metres to 37,6 metres.

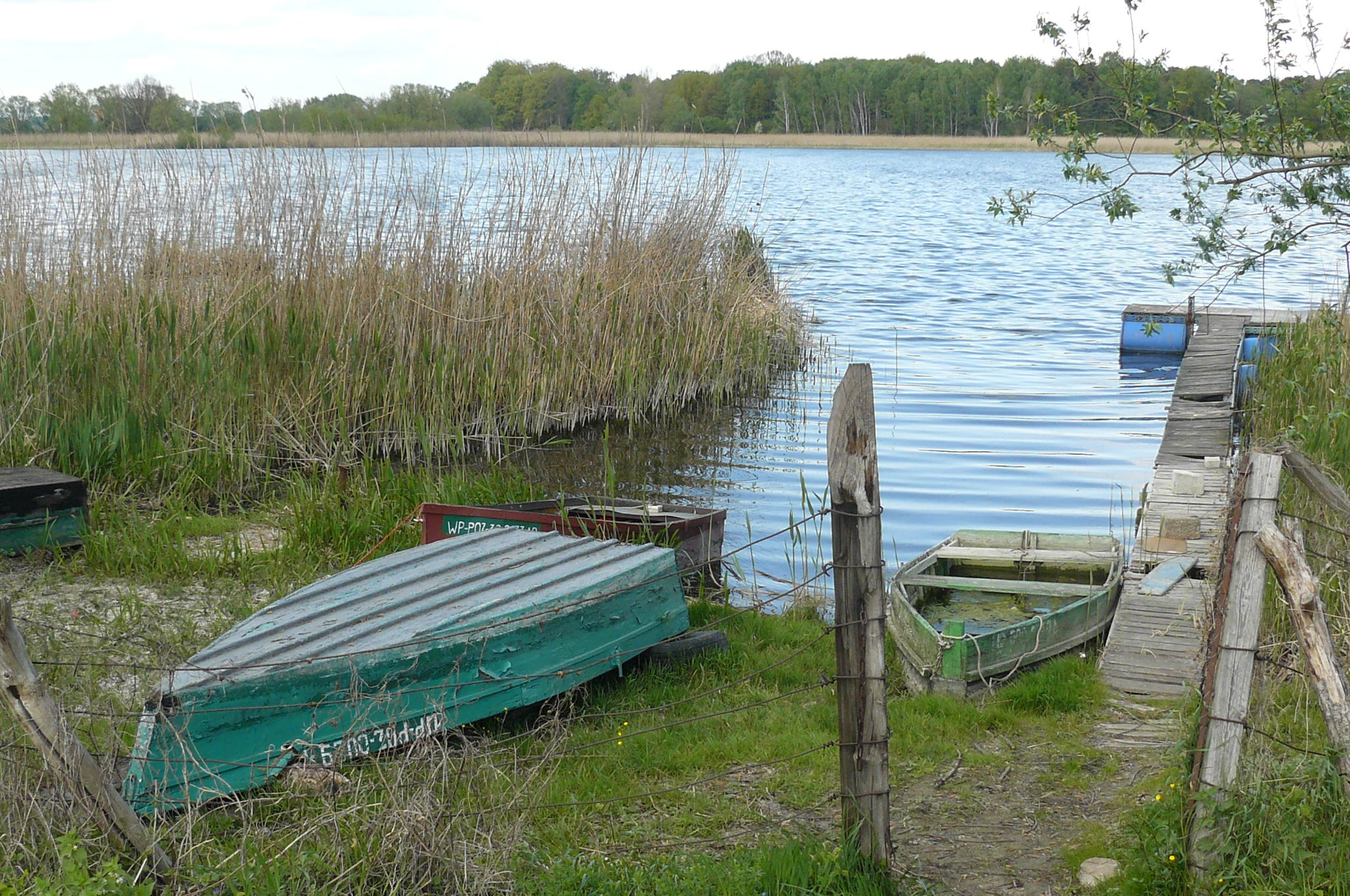
Small Kierskie Lake

=== Uses ===
It is known in the country as a centre for water sports including sailing and iceboating. There is one protected swimming area in Krzyżowniki as well as numerous resorts. The Wpław przez Kiekrz swimming competition is held here every year. The lake is also the venue for the swimming leg of the Ironman 70.3 Poznań triathlon.

=== Small Kierskie Lake ===
The Small Kierskie Lake is a hypertrophic lake located a kilometre north of the Great Kiekrz Lake. The size, according to various sources, is from 64.25 acres to 84.02 acres. The water table is located at 70.5 or 71.7 metres above sea level. The average depth of the lake is 1.4 metres and the maximum depth is from 2.3 or 2.5 metres.

The Samica River flows through the lake. It is a quiet zone in which the use of boat motors is prohibited.

The Convent of the Congregation of the Sisters of Our Lady of Mercy and the St. Faustyna Kowalska Path commemorating St. Faustyna's stay in Kiekrz in 1929 are located here.

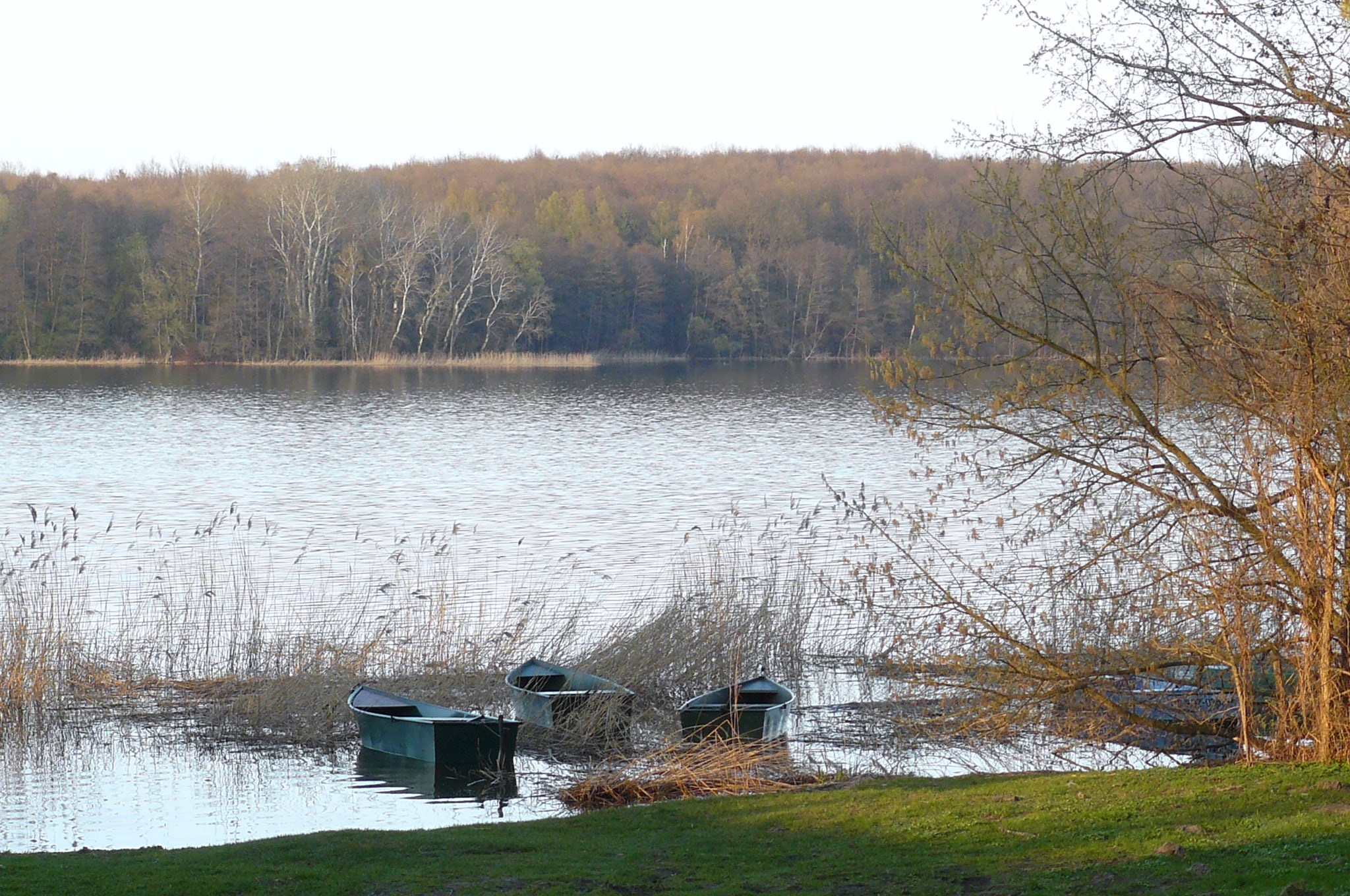
Kiekrz Lake

== Geography and climate ==
Kiekrz is a village located 12 km from Poznań in the north-westerly direction. Kiekrz, in terms of administration, is currently divided into two parts. The "rural" part - the housing estate of Chwaliszewo, Kierska street and all streets adjacent to it along with the village of Pawłowice form the sołectwo belonging to the Municipality of Rokietnica, Poznań County. The second, "urban" part is a subject of the Delegation of Poznań-Jeżyce.

Kiekrz and its immediate surroundings are situated around three lakes: the Great Kierskie Lake (Wielkie Jezioro Kierskie), the Small Kierskie Lake (Małe Jezioro Kierskie) and the Strzeszyńskie Lake. The valleys of these lakes were formed by melting glaciers thousands of years ago.

The Great Kierskie Lake is currently the largest lake within the limits of Poznań. It is a very important reservoir for water sports, mainly sailing and iceboats in the winter season. The climate is mild and winds blow mostly from the west.

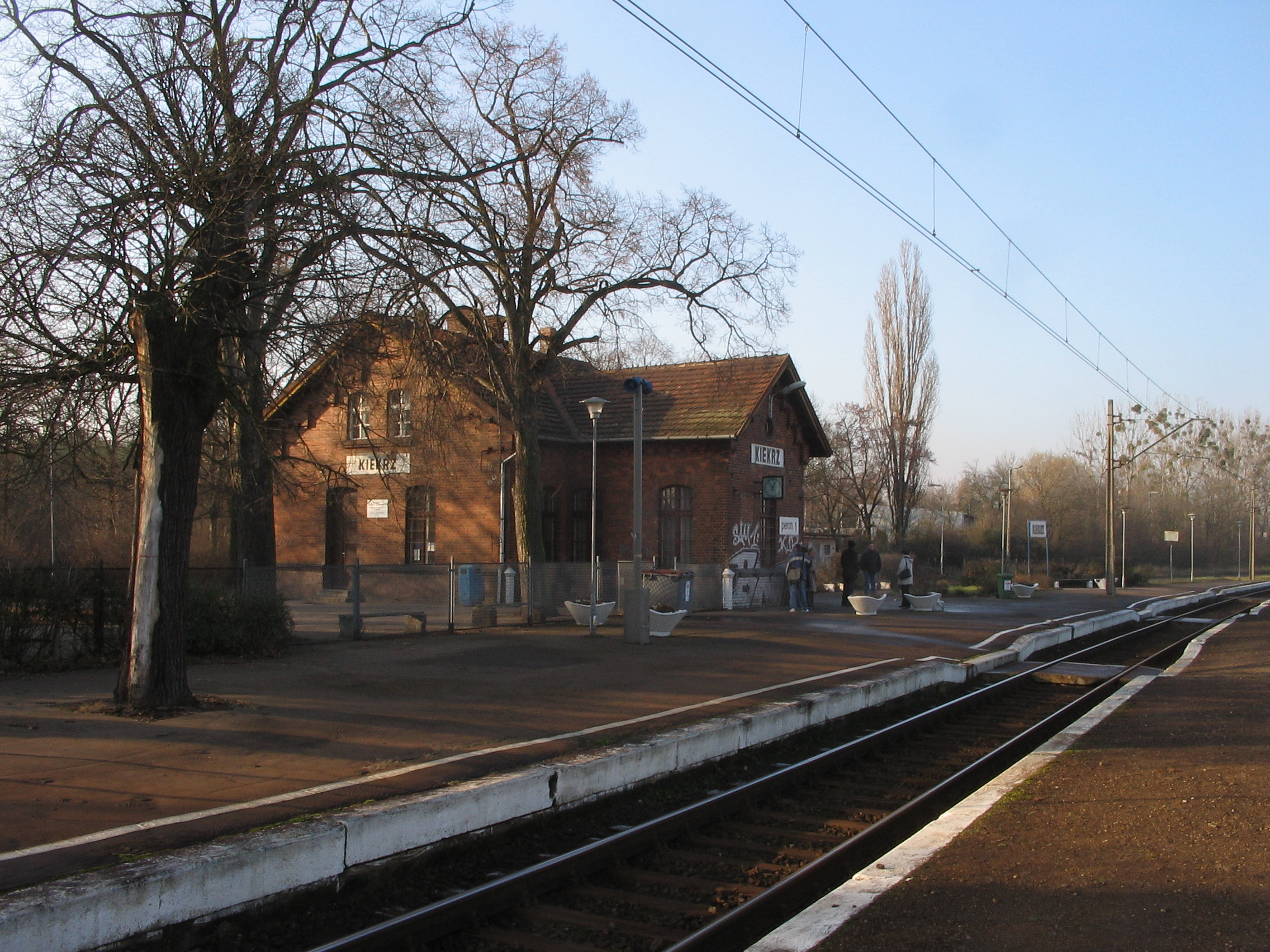
Kiekrz Railway Station

== Public transportation ==
- Kiekrz Train Station (PKP)
- MPK Poznań - lines:
  - line 195 (route: Kiekrz - Poznań-Ogrody)
  - line 186 (route: Kiekrz - Poznań-Ogrody)
  - night bus line 219 (route: Kiekrz - Poznań Główny)
- Suburban bus (RokBus) - lines:
  - line 833 (route: Przecław - Poznań-Ogrody)
  - line 831 (route: Mrowino - Poznań-Ogrody)
  - line 853 (route: Przecław - Poznań-Ogrody)

=== Kiekrz train station ===
Kiekrz is a junction station built in 1885 and located on the border between the village of Kiekrz at the entrance to the city from the north. The station lies on the Poznań Główny-Szczecin Główny railway route. It is also where the Poznań commodity bypass begins which aggregates all the traffic from the direction of Inowrocław, Piła and Krzyż and leads them to the Poznań Franowo classification yard, bypassing the city centre.

== See also ==
- Kiekrz
