= Cerekwica =

Cerekwica may refer to the following places in Poland:

- Cerekwica, Lower Silesian Voivodeship (south-west Poland)
- Cerekwica, Kuyavian-Pomeranian Voivodeship (north-central Poland)
- Cerekwica, Jarocin County in Greater Poland Voivodeship (west-central Poland)
- Cerekwica, Poznań County in Greater Poland Voivodeship (west-central Poland)
