= Frederick I's expedition to Głogów =

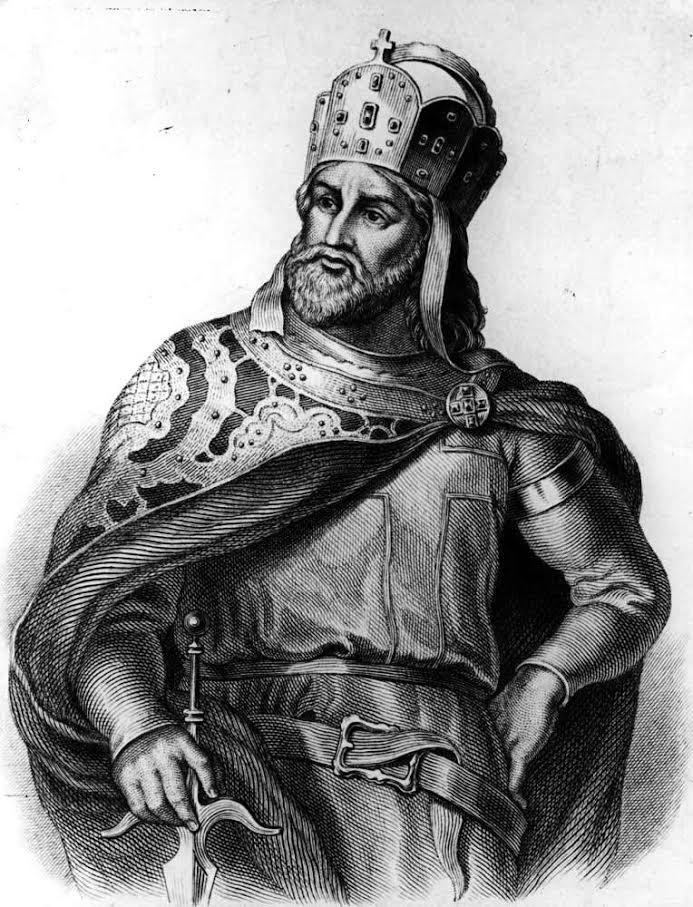
- Frederick I Barbarossa, Holy Roman Emperor
Date	Early 1157 – 30 August 1157
Location	Głogów, Poznań, Greater Poland
Result	German victory

Belligerents
Kingdom of Poland; Cumania; Old Prussians	Holy Roman Empire; Duchy of Bohemia

Commanders and leaders
Bolesław IV the Curly	Frederick I Barbarossa; Vladislaus II

Strength
Unknown	Unknown

Frederick I's expedition to Głogów took place when Emperor Frederick I Barbarossa launched a campaign into Poland to support Władysław II the Exile, exiled son of Bolesław III Wrymouth. The conflict centered on the defense of Głogów. Despite initial resistance, the Polish forces were overwhelmed by the German army's superior numbers. Głogów fell, marking a significant blow to Polish defenses in the west. The conflict ended with humiliating terms for Poland, but it was the last major confrontation between the Kingdom of Poland and the Holy Roman Empire in the early Piast period.

== Background ==
In 1157, the German Emperor Frederick Barbarossa launched a military campaign against Poland, defending the rights of Władysław, the eldest son of Bolesław III Wrymouth, who had been exiled by his brothers. Before the Germans compelled the Poles to submit, they seized the strategic stronghold of Głogów.

Until 1157, the Głogów fortress fulfilled its duty of defending the western border of the Piast state, exemplified by its famous defense in 1109. However, events in the mid-12th century revealed Poland's political weakness, divided into provinces among Bolesław III Wrymouth's sons.

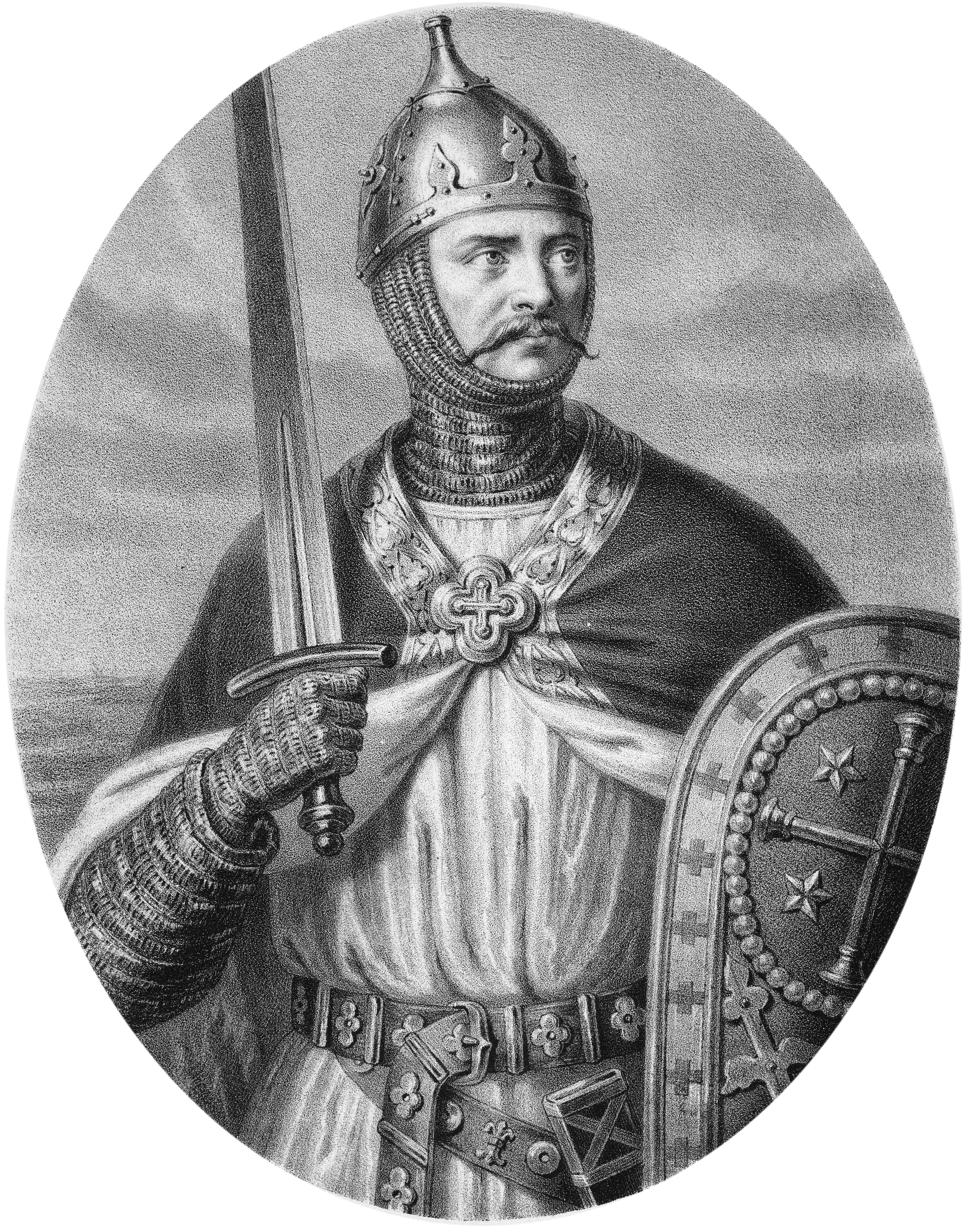
Władysław II the Exile

As a result of Poland's division into provinces after the death of Duke Bolesław III Wrymouth in 1138, his sons engaged in fratricidal conflict. The eldest, Władysław, was banished from the country. Even before the overthrow of the senior, the castellan of Głogów conspired against his lord, joining the opposition led by Duke Bolesław IV the Curly, who seized the Silesian province along with Głogów in 1146.

Władysław, who eventually found refuge at the imperial court, attempted to bring about German intervention in Poland. He succeeded only in 1157, during the reign of Emperor Frederick I Barbarossa. At the exile's request, the emperor undertook an expedition against the Piast state.

== War ==
The campaign began on August 4, 1157, as Barbarossa's army departed from Halle, presumably following traditional German expedition routes through Lusatia. Despite receiving military aid from Cumans, Prussians, and Pomeranians, the Piast forces found themselves outmatched by the superior numbers and quality of the German army.

As Barbarossa's forces advanced into Poland, the Piast rulers employed delaying tactics, obstructing paths with obstacles and cutting through forests to impede the enemy's progress. Faced with overwhelming opposition, the Piast forces resorted to devastating their own land to hinder the imperial army's advance. Nonetheless, Barbarossa's troops pillaged bishoprics, looted, and committed acts of violence.

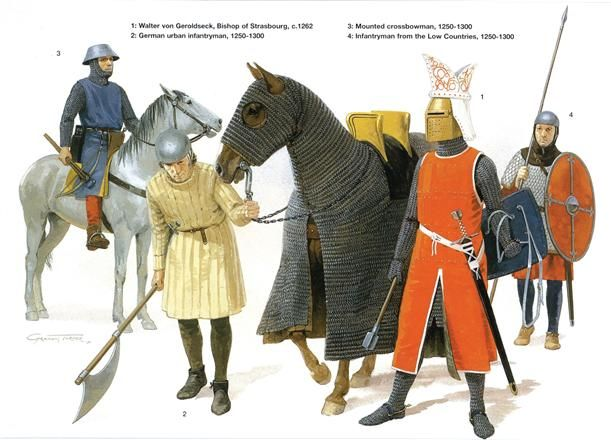
Medieval German knights

Barbarossa's detailed account of the invasion in his letter to Wibald, the abbot of Würzburg, highlighted the natural and artificial defenses encountered by the German army. Notably, the absence of their preferred beverage, beer, led to discomfort among the German troops, resulting in a dysentery outbreak that claimed more lives than battles with the Polish forces.

"Although Poland was very defensible by art and nature, so that our predecessors, kings and emperors, with great difficulty reached the Oder River, we, by the grace of God (...) penetrated through the barriers erected in narrow places [passes], gathering dense tree trunks and piling them up with great ingenuity. And (...) the Oder River, which supposedly forms a rampart around the entire land and, due to its depth, excludes all access, contrary to the expectations of the Poles, we crossed with our entire army."

The imperial forces reached Głogów on August 22, with reinforcements from Czech-Moravian allies bolstering their ranks. Despite the fortress's advantageous position on an island surrounded by rivers, the Polish garrison, recognizing the enemy's superiority, opted to abandon Głogów after setting it ablaze. The fall of Głogów signified the breach of the final line of Piast defense in the west, with other fortresses meeting similar fates. Following the conquest, Barbarossa's army continued its advance towards Greater Poland.

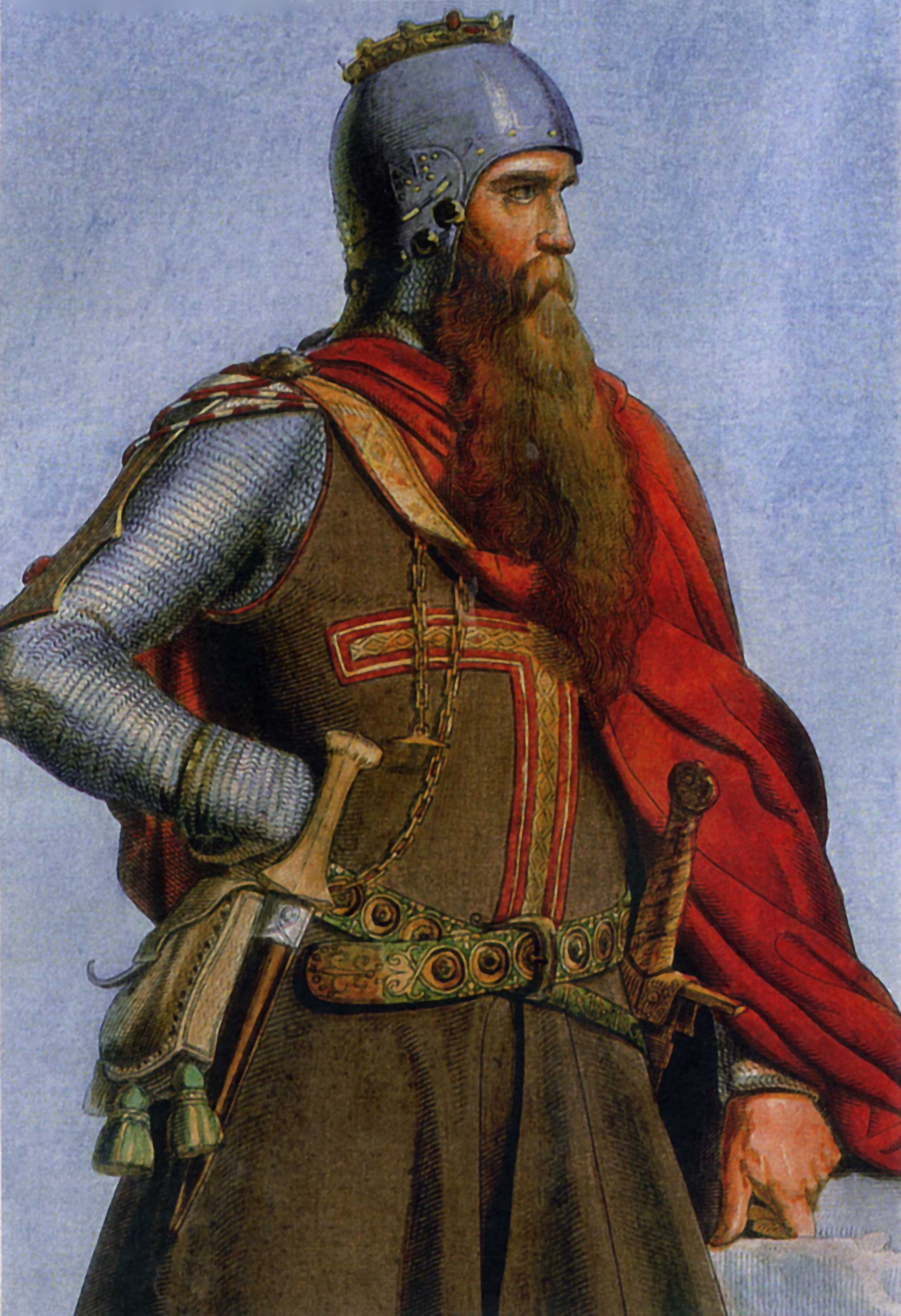
Frederick I Barbarossa

The unexpected progress of the German-Czech-Moravian forces likely caught the Poles off guard, as they had anticipated a delay in the expedition following unsuccessful diplomatic efforts. Some military historians argue that abandoning Głogów was a strategic necessity due to the inadequacy of Polish fortresses against Barbarossa's army.

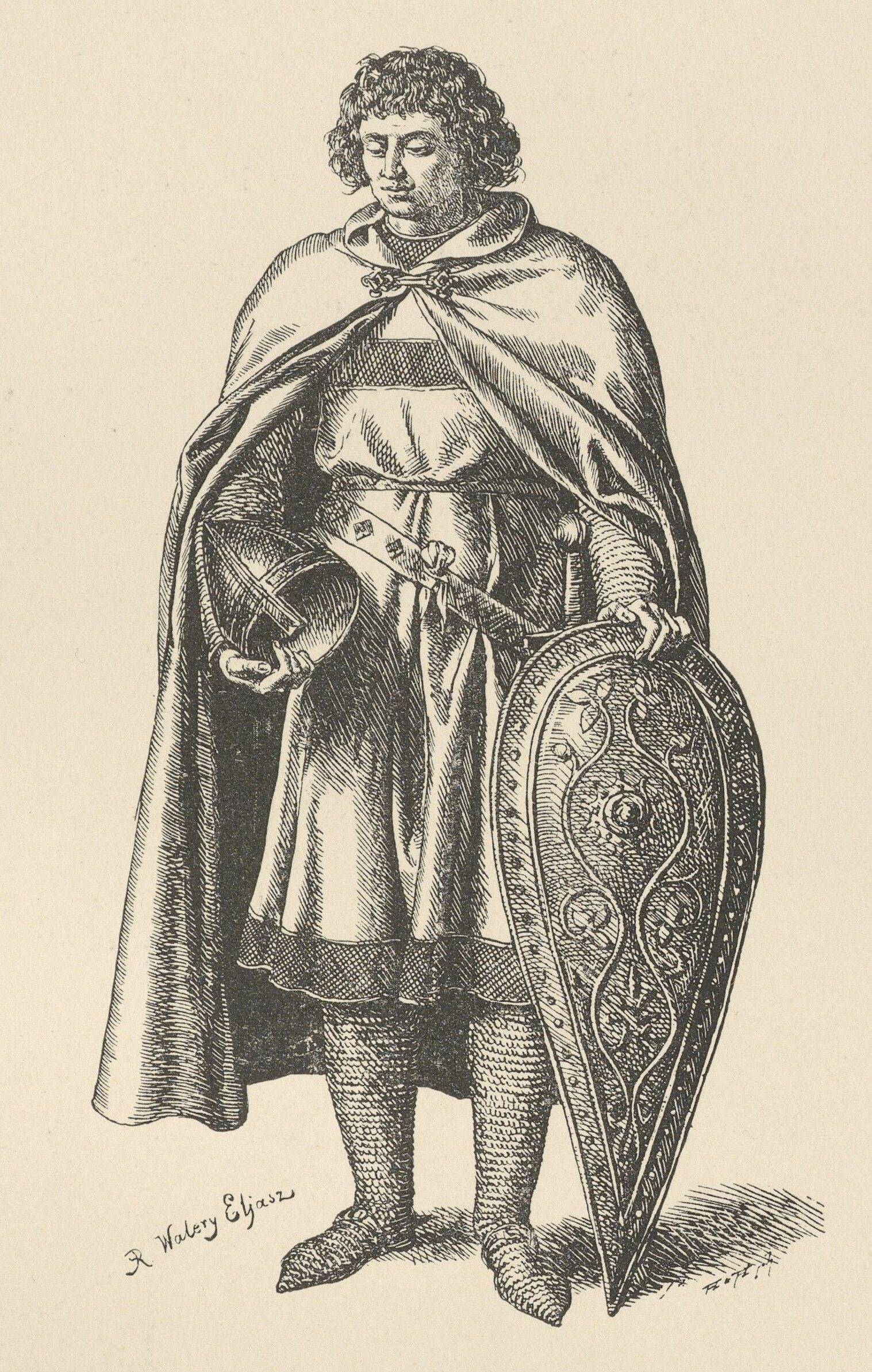
Bolesław IV the Curly

The conflict concluded with peace of Krzyszkowo on humiliating peace terms for Poland. The treaty stipulated that a part of the disputed Polish lands, claimed by Władysław II, who had been exiled by his younger brothers, be placed under imperial fief. By paying tribute, Boleslaw IV the Curly could continue to rule the illegally seized senior district. In addition he pledged to participate in the following year - 1158 - in the so-called imperial "Milan expedition" and to pay an outstanding tribute of 3,400 silver fines. The pledge of peace in Krzyszkowo obligations was to send selected hostages from wealthy Polish families to the German Kingdom, as well as Casimir II the Just, the youngest brother of Bolesław and Mieszko III the Old. However, Boleslaw the Curly retained some autonomy and control over the Silesian province, including Głogów, under the recognition of Barbarossa, and he did not fulfill most of the provisions made during the peace in Krzyszkowo.

== Aftermath ==
Barbarossa's campaign succeeded in devastating parts of Poland, the conflict marked the final major confrontation between Poland and the Holy Roman Empire during the early Piast period, with subsequent decades witnessing a decline in military actions on Poland's western border until the period of conflict over Lebus in 13th century between Poland and the Margraviate of Brandenburg.

While Władysław the Exile did not regain control of the Silesian province with Głogów, Bolesław the Curly retained it, along with other fortresses. Głogów, rebuilt after the war, gradually lost military significance, leading to the development of a new city on the left bank of the Oder River.

== See also ==
- Władysław II the Exile
- Frederick I Barbarossa
- Bolesław IV the Curly
- Testament of Bolesław III Wrymouth

== Sources ==
- Norman Davies, God's playground, A History of Poland: The Origins to 1795, Vol 1, 1981 ISBN 978-0-231-12817-9
- Magdalena Biniaś-Szkopek: Bolesław IV Kędzierzawy - książę Mazowsza i princeps. Poznań: Wydawnictwo Poznańskie, 2009. ISBN 978-83-7177-603-8
- Grabski Andrzej Feliks, Polska sztuka wojenna w okresie wczesnofeudalnym, Wydawnictwo MON, Warszawa 1959. ISBN 978-83-7889-443-8
- Hendel Zenon, Głogów wczesnośredniowieczny w świetle badań archeologicznych, „Głogowskie Zeszyty naukowe. Studia i materiały z dziejów Głogowa”, t. 3, Głogów-Wrocław 1993. ISBN 978-83-60732-24-3
- Kozaczewski Tadeusz, Głogów średniowieczny do końca XIII w. Osadnictwo i architektura, Państwowa Wyższa Szkoła Zawodowa w Głogowie, Głogów 2006. ISBN 83-922114-1-3
- Miśkiewicz Benon, Szkice z dziejów wojskowości, Wydawnictwo Naukowe PWN, Warszawa 1991. ISBN 978-83-01-10452-8
- Towarzystwo Ziemi Głogowskiej, Dziedzictwo Kulturowe Głogowa,
- Nowakowski Dominik, Siedziby książęce i rycerskie księstwa głogowskiego w średniowieczu, Wydawnictwo Instytutu Archeologii i Etnologii PAN, Wrocław 2008. ISBN 978-83-89499-48-6
- Weiss Ernst, Frederick Barbarossa, Państwowy Instytut Wydawniczy
- Olejnik Karol, Obrona polskiej granicy zachodniej: okres rozbicia dzielnicowego i monarchii stanowej 1138-1385, Instytut Zachodni, Poznań 1970.
- Olejnik Karol, Cedynia, Niemcza, Głogów, Krzyszków, Krajowa Agencja Wydawnicza, Kraków 1988. ISBN 978-83-03-02038-3
- Mariusz Dworatschek, Władysław II Wygnaniec, vol. VIII „Władcy Polski”, Kolekcja Hachette, Warszawa 2009. ISBN 978-83-242-0814-2
- Szymczak Jan, Grody w Polsce Środkowej i Zachodniej w okresie rozbicia dzielnicowego, Uniwersytet Łódzki, Łódź 1980.
