= Napachanie =

- Village
- Location within Poland
- Coordinates: 52°29′N 16°44′E
- Country: Poland
- Voivodeship: Greater Poland
- County: Poznań
- Gmina: Rokietnica
- Population: 460

Napachanie [napaˈxaɲɛ] is a village and sołectwo in the administrative district of Gmina Rokietnica, within Poznań County, Greater Poland Voivodeship, in west-central Poland. The village lies approximately 4 kilometres (2 mi) south of Rokietnica and 16 km (10 mi) north-west of the regional capital Poznań. It has a junior high school (gimnazjum) and a palace from 1879, built in the style of Queen Anna's North-European Renaissance.

Napachanie was the birthplace of Antoni of Napachanie (1494–1561), professor and rector of the University of Kraków.
