= Samica Kierska =

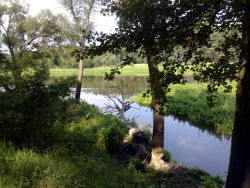
- Samica Kierska river mouth

Location
- Country: Poland
- Voivodeship: Greater Poland

Physical characteristics
- Source: Kierskie Lake
  - location: Kiekrz, Poznań
  - coordinates: 52°28′22″N 16°47′28″E
  - elevation: 85 m (279 ft)
- Mouth: Warta
  - location: southwest of Kiszewo, Oborniki County
  - coordinates: 52°40′20″N 16°39′59″E
  - elevation: 45.5 m (149 ft)
- Length: 36.5 km (22.7 mi)
- Basin size: 224.1 km^{2} (86.5 mi^{2})

Basin features
- Progression: Warta→ Oder→ Baltic Sea

Samica Kierska is a river of Poland, a tributary of the Warta at Kiszewo.
