= Kobylniki, Poznań County =

Kobylniki
- Village
- Location within Poland
- Coordinates: 52°28′22″N 16°43′17″E
- Country: Poland
- Voivodeship: Greater Poland
- County: Poznań
- Gmina: Rokietnica

Kobylniki [kɔbɨlˈniki] is a village in the administrative district of Gmina Rokietnica, within Poznań County, Greater Poland Voivodeship, in west-central Poland.
