= Dalekie, Poznań County =

Dalekie
- Village
- Location within Poland
- Coordinates: 52°29′8″N 16°40′55″E
- Country: Poland
- Voivodeship: Greater Poland
- County: Poznań
- Gmina: Rokietnica

Dalekie [daˈlɛkʲɛ] is a village in the administrative district of Gmina Rokietnica, within Poznań County, Greater Poland Voivodeship, in west-central Poland.
