= Rogierówko =

- Village
- Location within Poland
- Coordinates: 52°28′N 16°45′E
- Country: Poland
- Voivodeship: Greater Poland
- County: Poznań
- Gmina: Rokietnica

Rogierówko [rɔɡʲɛˈrufkɔ] is a village in the administrative district of Gmina Rokietnica, within Poznań County, Greater Poland Voivodeship, in west-central Poland.
