= Bytkowo =

- Village
- Location within Poland
- Coordinates: 52°30′53″N 16°46′35″E
- Country: Poland
- Voivodeship: Greater Poland
- County: Poznań
- Gmina: Rokietnica

Bytkowo [bɨtˈkɔvɔ] is a village in the administrative district of Gmina Rokietnica, within Poznań County, Greater Poland Voivodeship, in west-central Poland.
