= Starzyny, Greater Poland Voivodeship =

Starzyny
- Village
- Location within Poland
- Coordinates: 52°29′36″N 16°45′20″E
- Country: Poland
- Voivodeship: Greater Poland
- County: Poznań
- Gmina: Rokietnica
- Population: 80

Starzyny [staˈʐɨnɨ] is a village in the administrative district of Gmina Rokietnica, within Poznań County, Greater Poland Voivodeship, in west-central Poland.
