= Rostworowo =

- Village
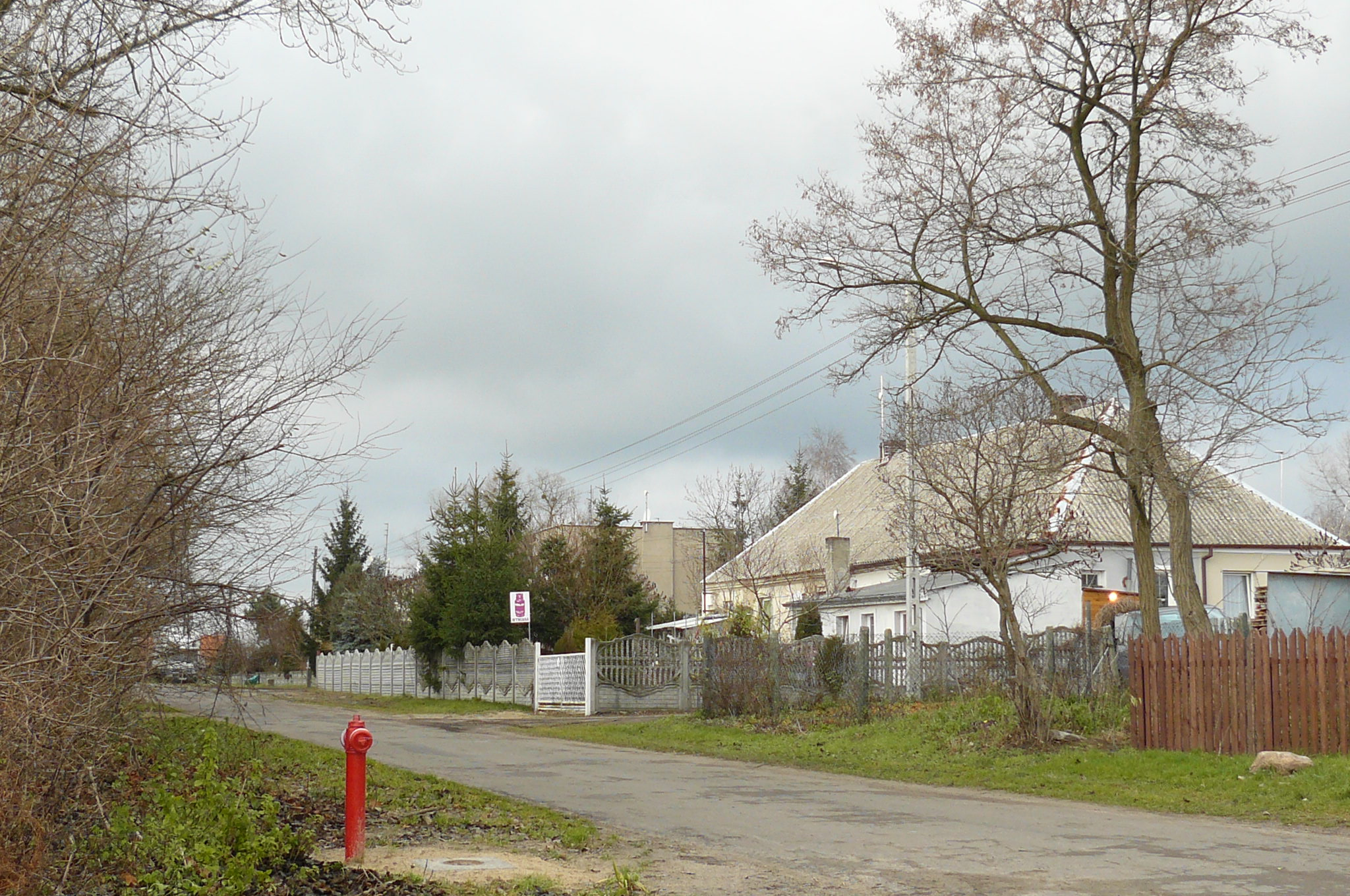
- Houses by the road side

- Location within Poland
- Coordinates: 52°32′17″N 16°45′34″E
- Country: Poland
- Voivodeship: Greater Poland
- County: Poznań
- Gmina: Rokietnica

Rostworowo [rɔstfɔˈrɔvɔ] is a village in the administrative district of Gmina Rokietnica, within Poznań County, Greater Poland Voivodeship, in west-central Poland.
