= Pawłowice, Poznań County =

Pawłowice
- Village
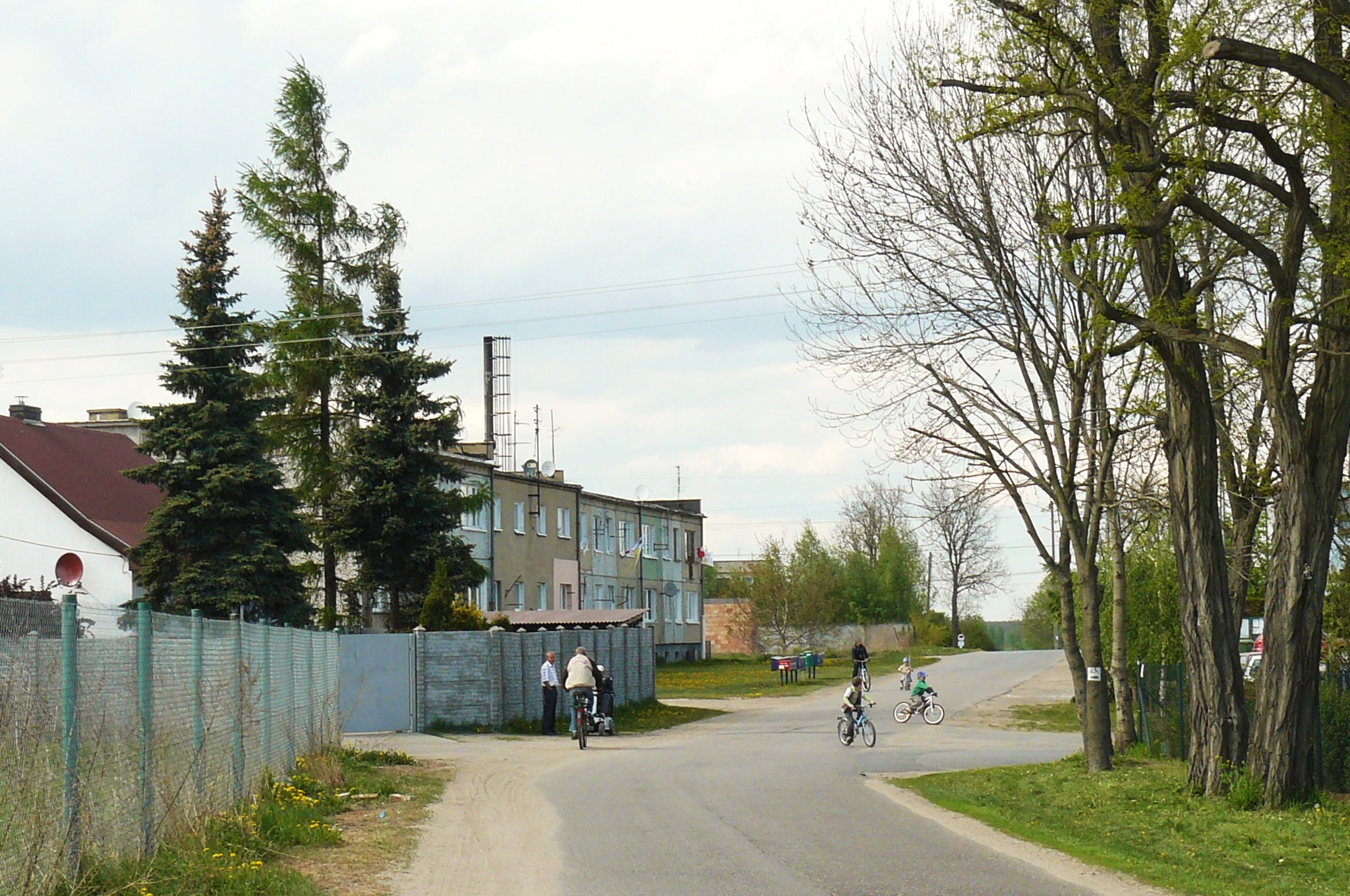

- Location within Poland
- Coordinates: 52°29′42″N 16°47′46″E
- Country: Poland
- Voivodeship: Greater Poland
- County: Poznań
- Gmina: Rokietnica
- Postal code: 62-090

Pawłowice [pavwɔˈvit͡sɛ] is a village in the administrative district of Gmina Rokietnica, within Poznań County, Greater Poland Voivodeship, in west-central Poland.
