= Żydowo, Poznań County =

Żydowo
- Village
- Location within Poland
- Coordinates: 52°32′52″N 16°45′13″E
- Country: Poland
- Voivodeship: Greater Poland
- County: Poznań
- Gmina: Rokietnica

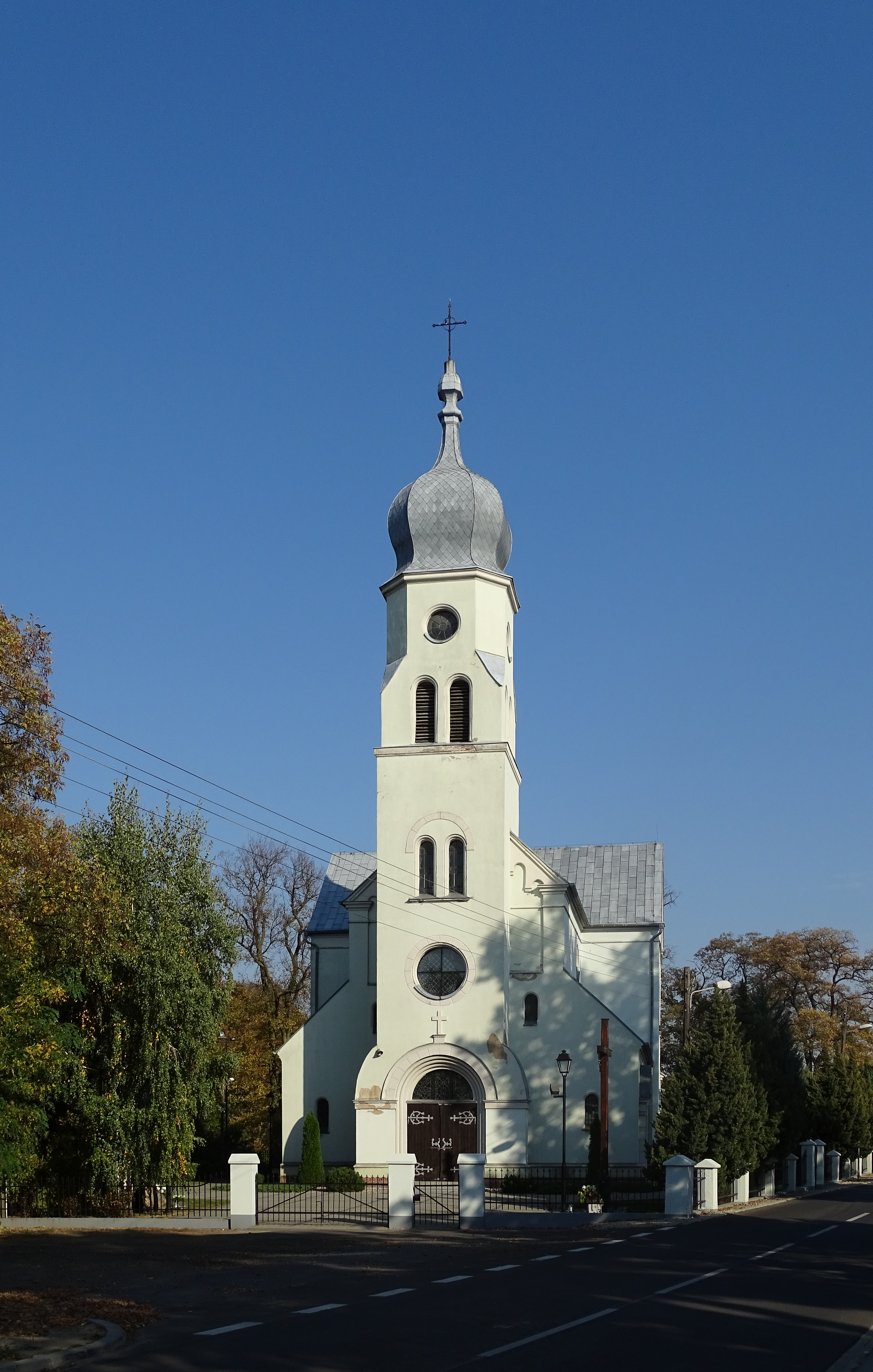
Church of Saint Nicholas.

Żydowo [ʐɨˈdɔvɔ] is a village in the administrative district of Gmina Rokietnica, within Poznań County, Greater Poland Voivodeship, in west-central Poland.
