= Kiekrz =

- Village
- Location within Poland
- Coordinates: 52°29′N 16°47′E
- Country: Poland
- Voivodeship: Greater Poland
- County: Poznań
- Gmina: Rokietnica

Kiekrz [kʲɛkʂ] is a village in the administrative district of Gmina Rokietnica, within Poznań County, Greater Poland Voivodeship, in west-central Poland.

Kiekrz village lies just north of Poznań's present city boundary. Adjacent to it within the city (in Jeżyce district) is a neighbourhood also called Kiekrz (and with a railway station, Poznań Kiekrz), lying on the northern shore of Poznań's largest lake, Jezioro Kierskie (Kiekrz Lake). This lake is extensively used for sailing. The lake, the neighbourhood of Kiekrz within Poznań, and the neighbourhood of Wielkie to the west of it, were brought within the city boundaries in 1987.

== See also ==
- Kiekrz, Poznań
