= Mrowino =

- Village
- Location within Poland
- Coordinates: 52°30′56″N 16°42′7″E
- Country: Poland
- Voivodeship: Greater Poland
- County: Poznań
- Gmina: Rokietnica
- Population: 750

Mrowino [mrɔˈvinɔ] is a village in the administrative district of Gmina Rokietnica, within Poznań County, Greater Poland Voivodeship, in west-central Poland.
