= Gmina Rokietnica, Greater Poland Voivodeship =

Gmina Rokietnica Rokietnica Commune
- Gmina
- Coat of arms
- Interactive map of Gmina Rokietnica
- Coordinates (Rokietnica): 52°30′44″N 16°44′44″E
- Country: Poland
- Voivodeship: Greater Poland
- County: Poznań County
- Seat: Rokietnica

Area
  - Total: 79.31 km^{2} (30.62 sq mi)

Population (2006)
  - Total: 9,415
  - Density: 118.7/km^{2} (307.5/sq mi)
- Website: http://www.rokietnica.pl

Gmina Rokietnica is a rural gmina (administrative district) in Poznań County, Greater Poland Voivodeship, in west-central Poland. Its seat is the village of Rokietnica, which lies approximately 18 kilometres (11 mi) north-west of the regional capital Poznań.

The gmina covers an area of 79.31 square kilometres (30.6 sq mi), and as of 2006 its total population is 9,415.

== Villages ==
Gmina Rokietnica contains the villages and settlements of Bytkowo, Cerekwica, Dalekie, Kiekrz, Kobylniki, Krzyszkowo, Mrowino, Napachanie, Pawłowice, Przybroda, Rogierówko, Rokietnica, Rostworowo, Sobota, Starzyny and Żydowo.

== Neighbouring gminas ==
Gmina Rokietnica is bordered by the city of Poznań and by the gminas of Kaźmierz, Oborniki, Suchy Las, Szamotuły and Tarnowo Podgórne.

== Sister cities ==
The following cities are twinned with Rokietnica:

- Viitasaari, Central Finland
