= Rokietnica, Greater Poland Voivodeship =

Rokietnica
- Village
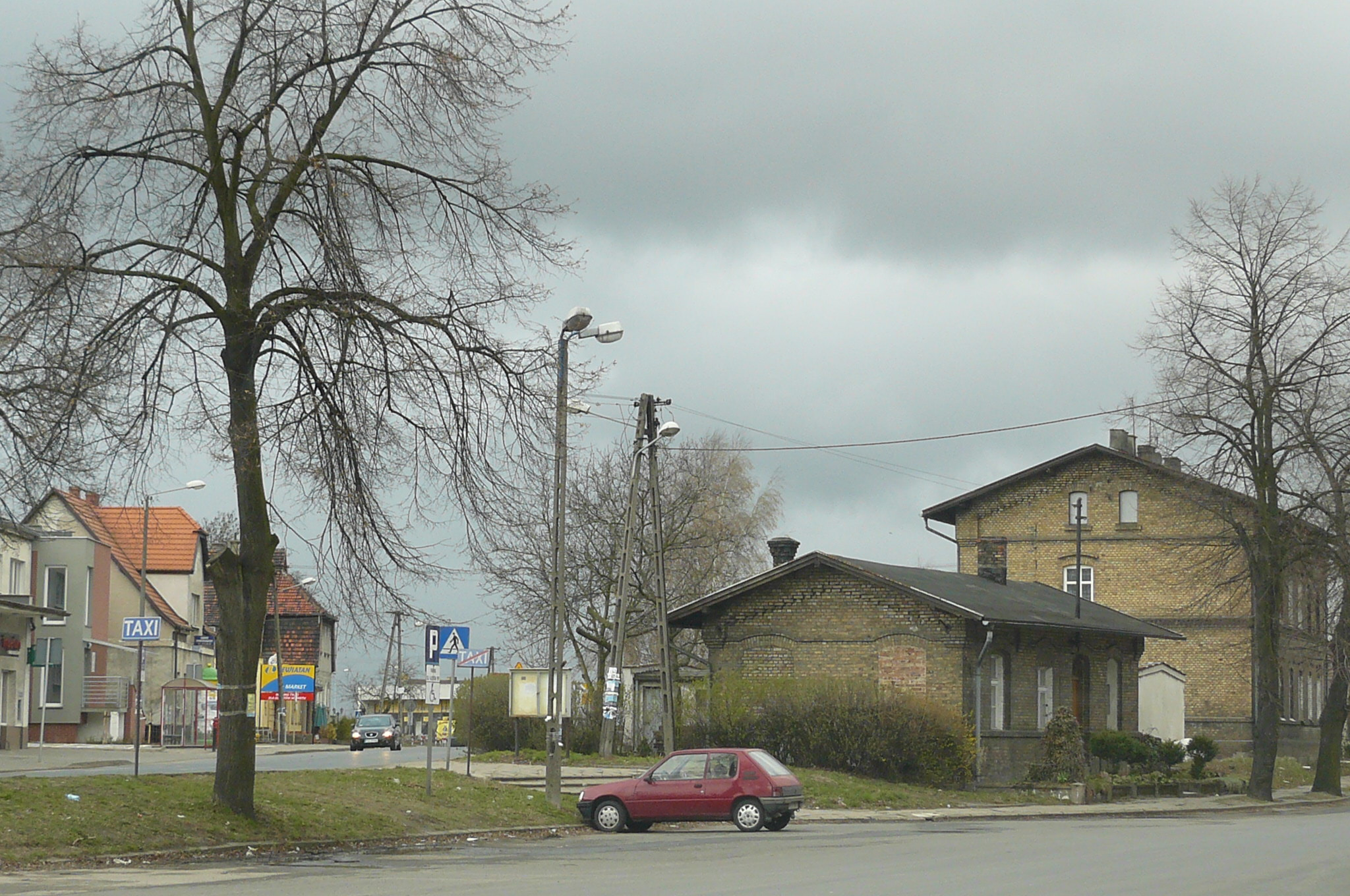
- Center of the village

- Location within Poland
- Coordinates: 52°30′44″N 16°44′44″E
- Country: Poland
- Voivodeship: Greater Poland
- County: Poznań
- Gmina: Rokietnica
- Population: 1,900
- Website: http://www.rokietnica.pl

Rokietnica [rɔkʲɛtˈnit͡sa] is a village in Poznań County, Greater Poland Voivodeship, in west-central Poland. It is the seat of the gmina (administrative district) called Gmina Rokietnica.

== Notable residents ==
- Georg von Hantelmann (1898–1924), World War I pilot
