= List of tourist attractions in Poznań =

Overview of tourist attractions in Poznań, Poland

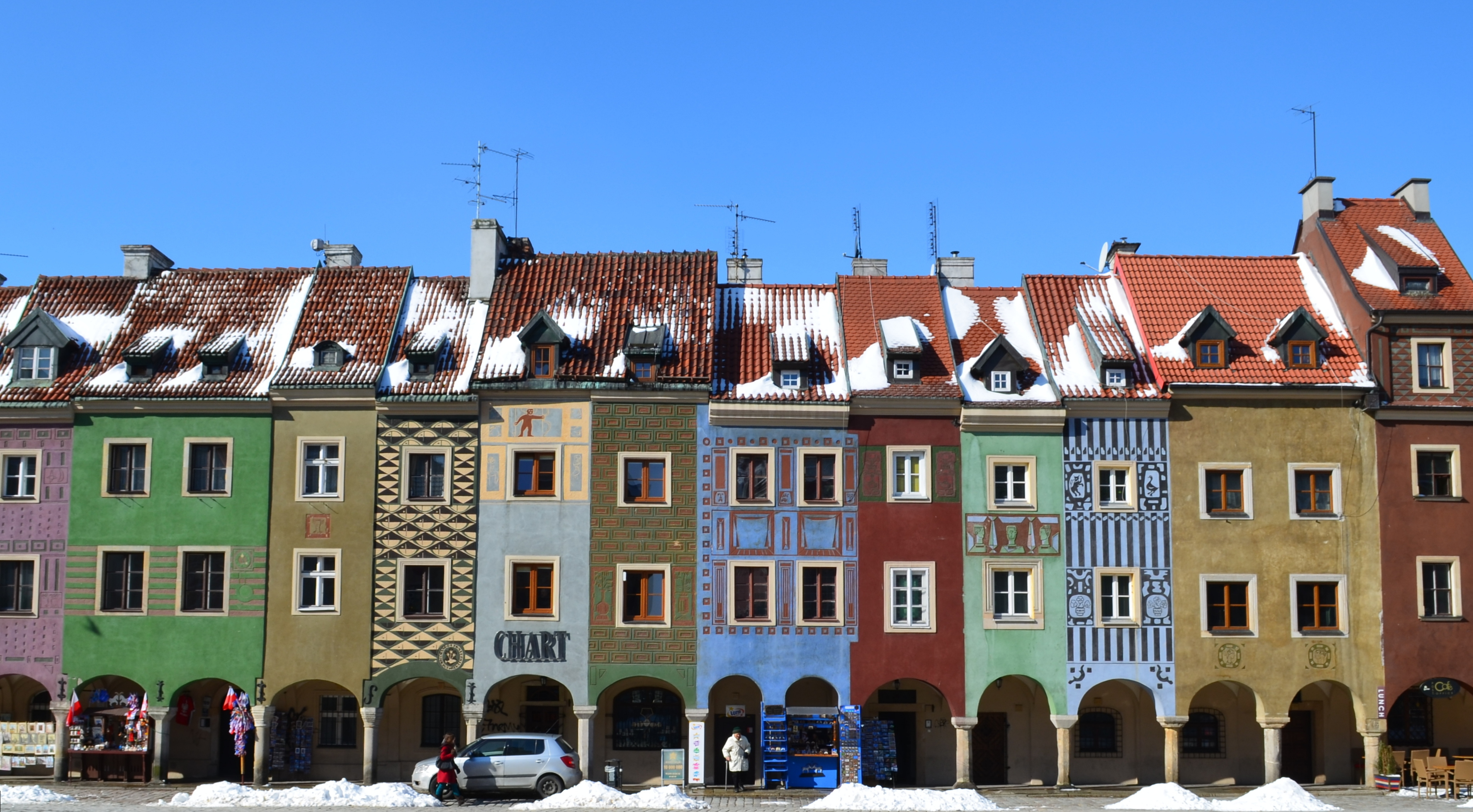
Merchant houses, originally 16th century herring stalls, at the Old Market Square.

The city of Poznań, the capital of Greater Poland Voivodeship, offers a variety of tourist attractions, including historical sights, monuments, museums, and theatres.

== Skyline ==
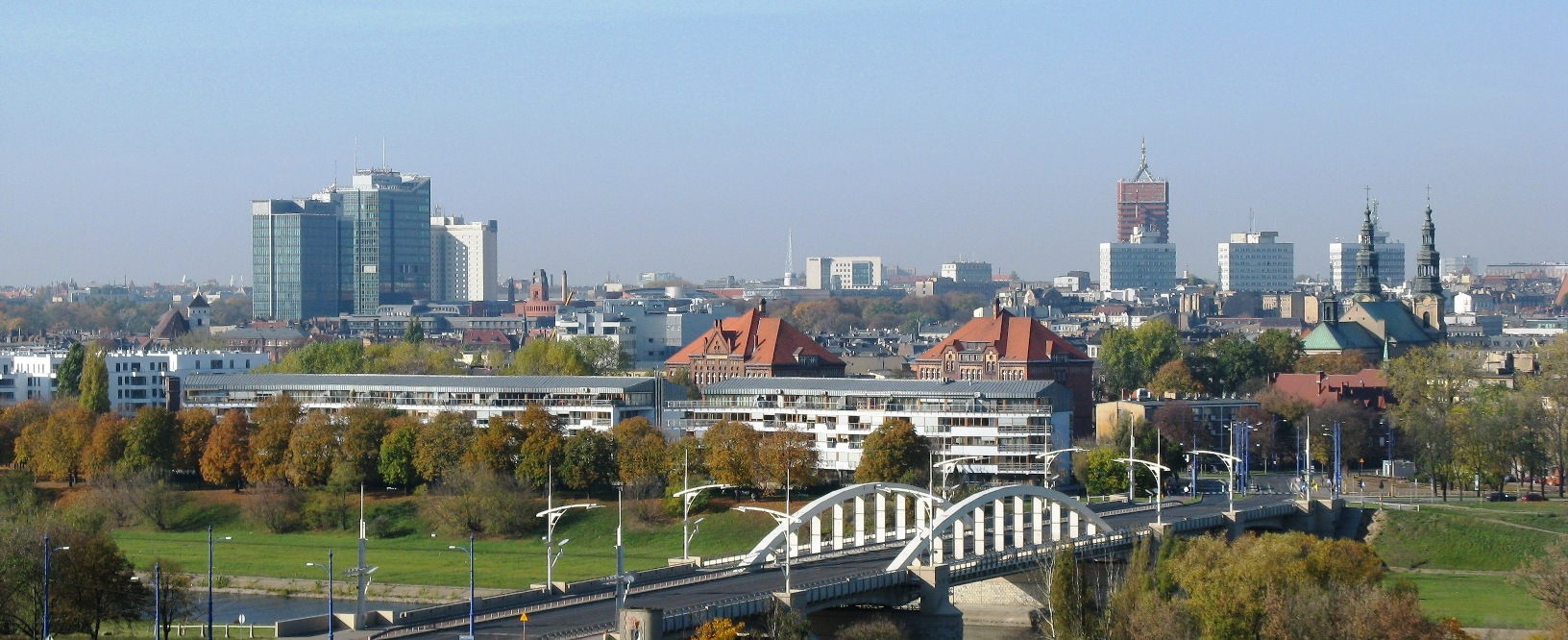
Poznań Panorama (partial)

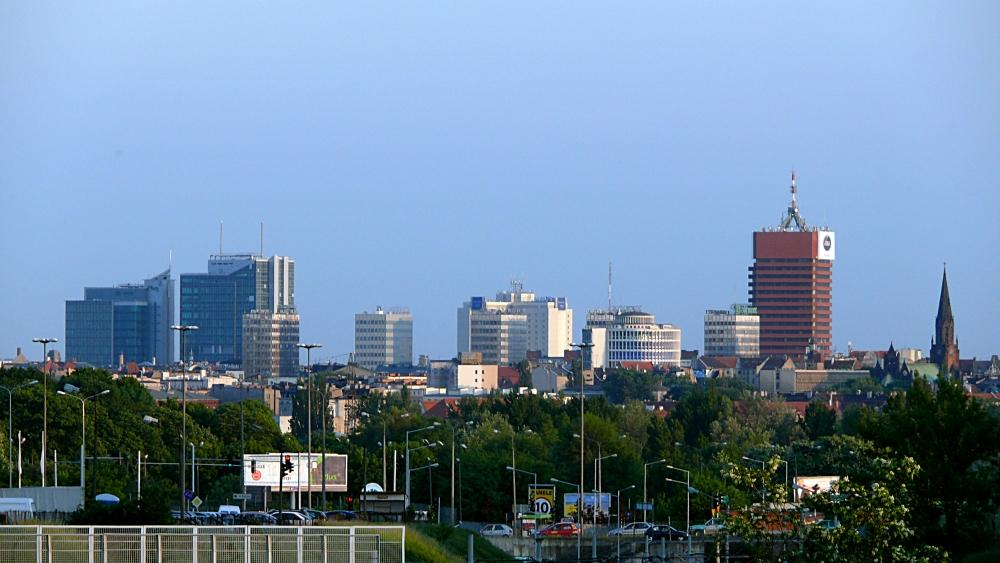
Notable highrises in central Poznań

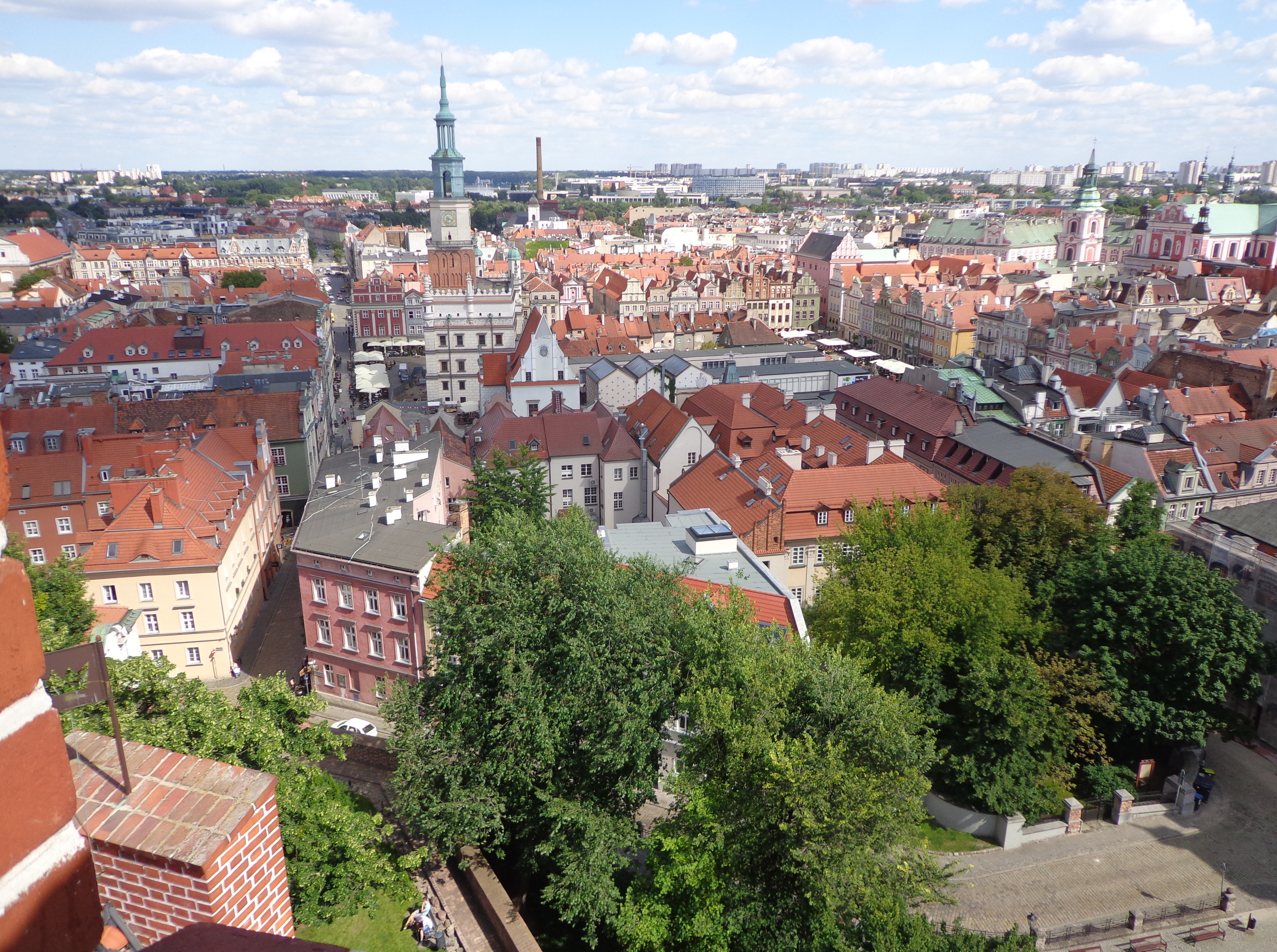
Old Town as seen from the Royal Castle

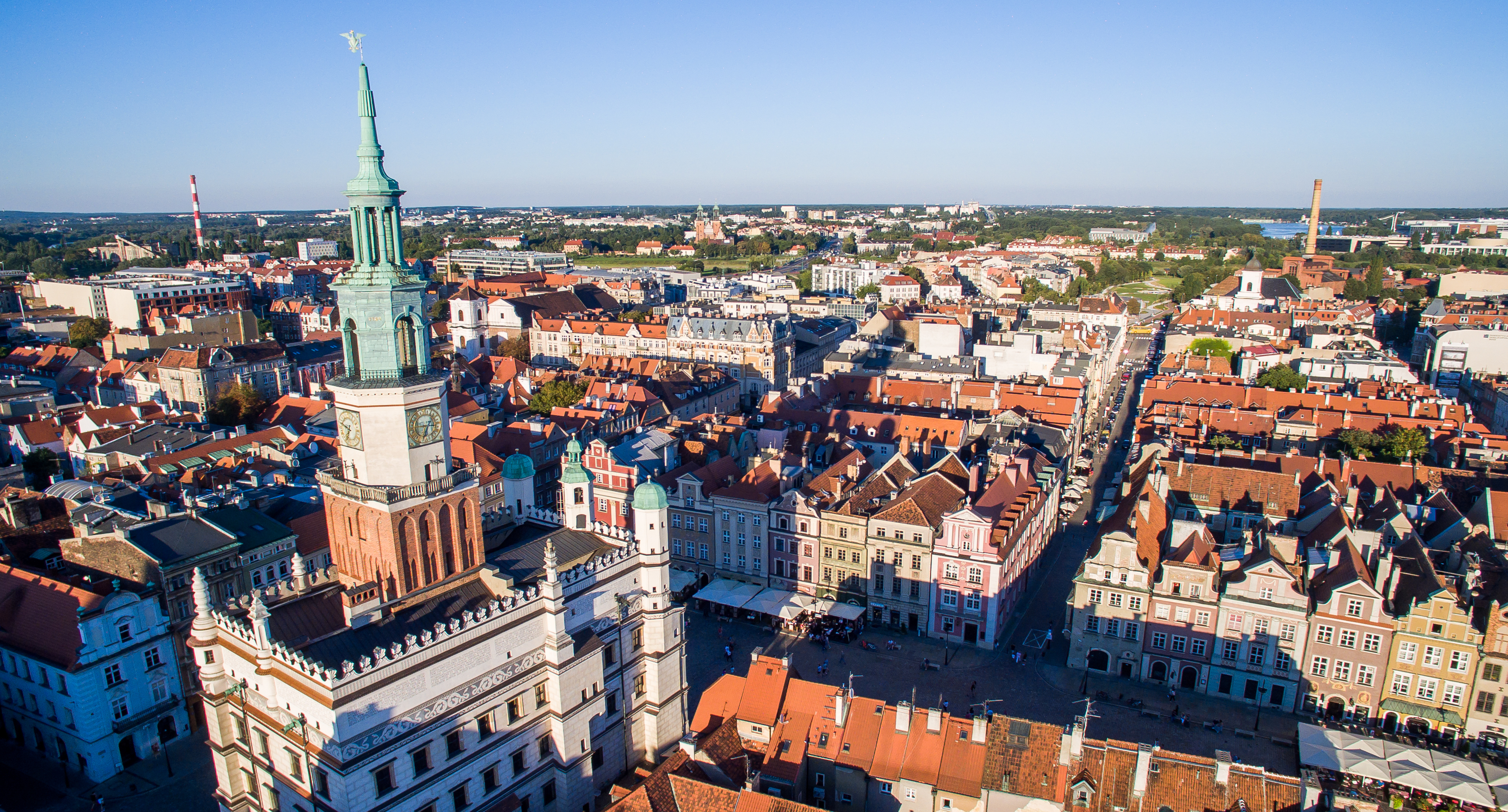
Aerial view of the Poznań Town Hall and skyline of the east part of the city

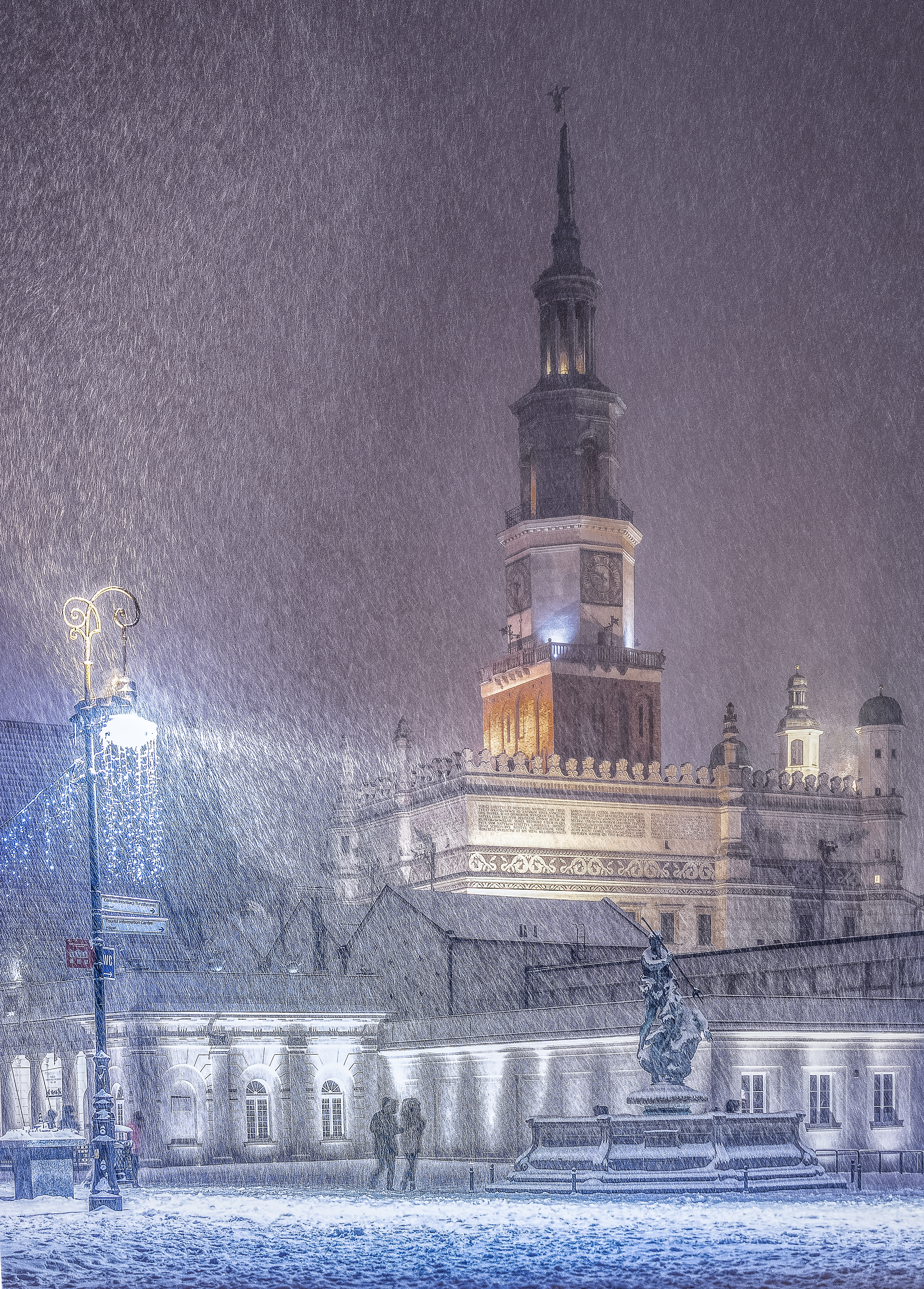
Town Hall, as seen across the Old Market Square

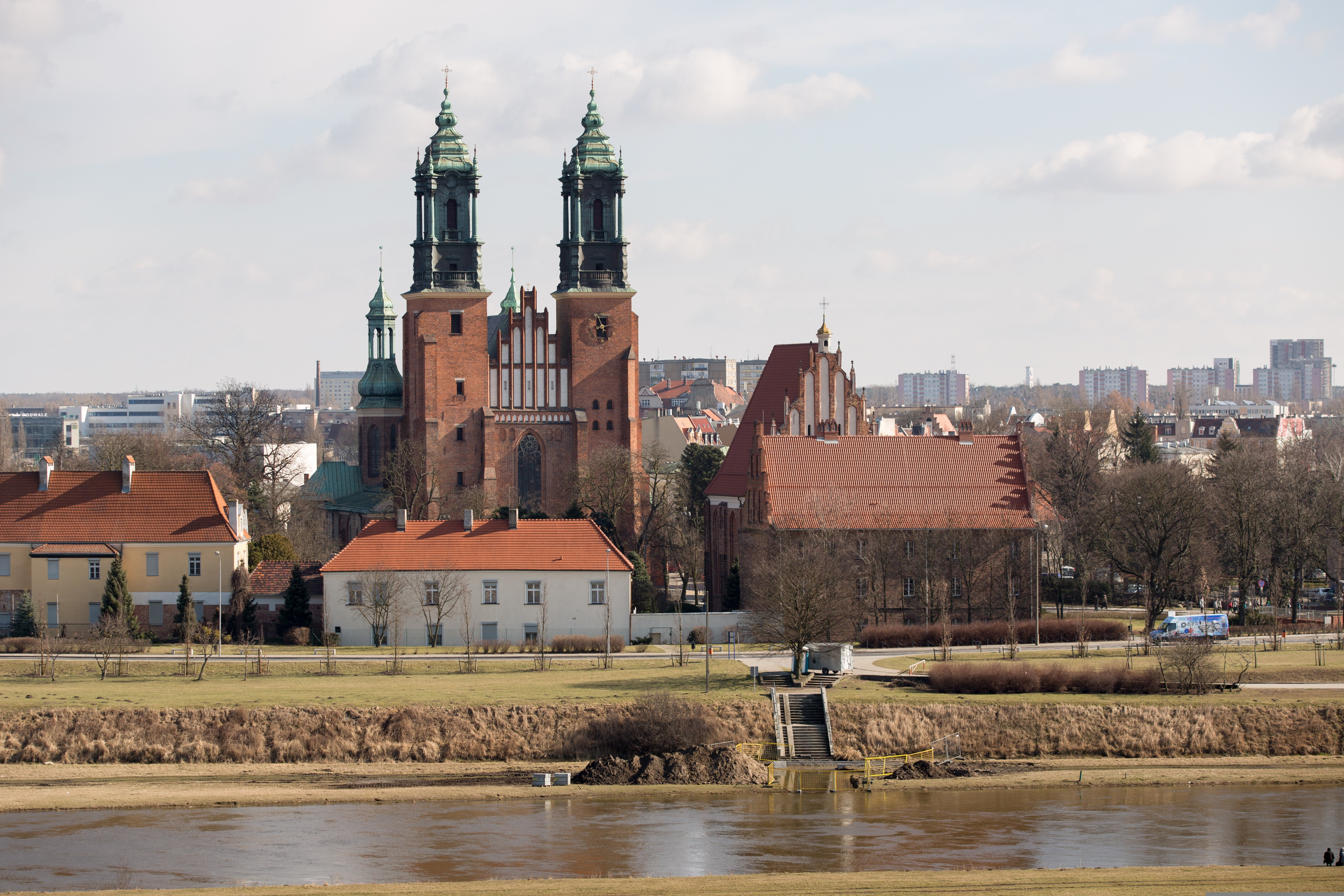
Ostrów Tumski island, as seen from the west

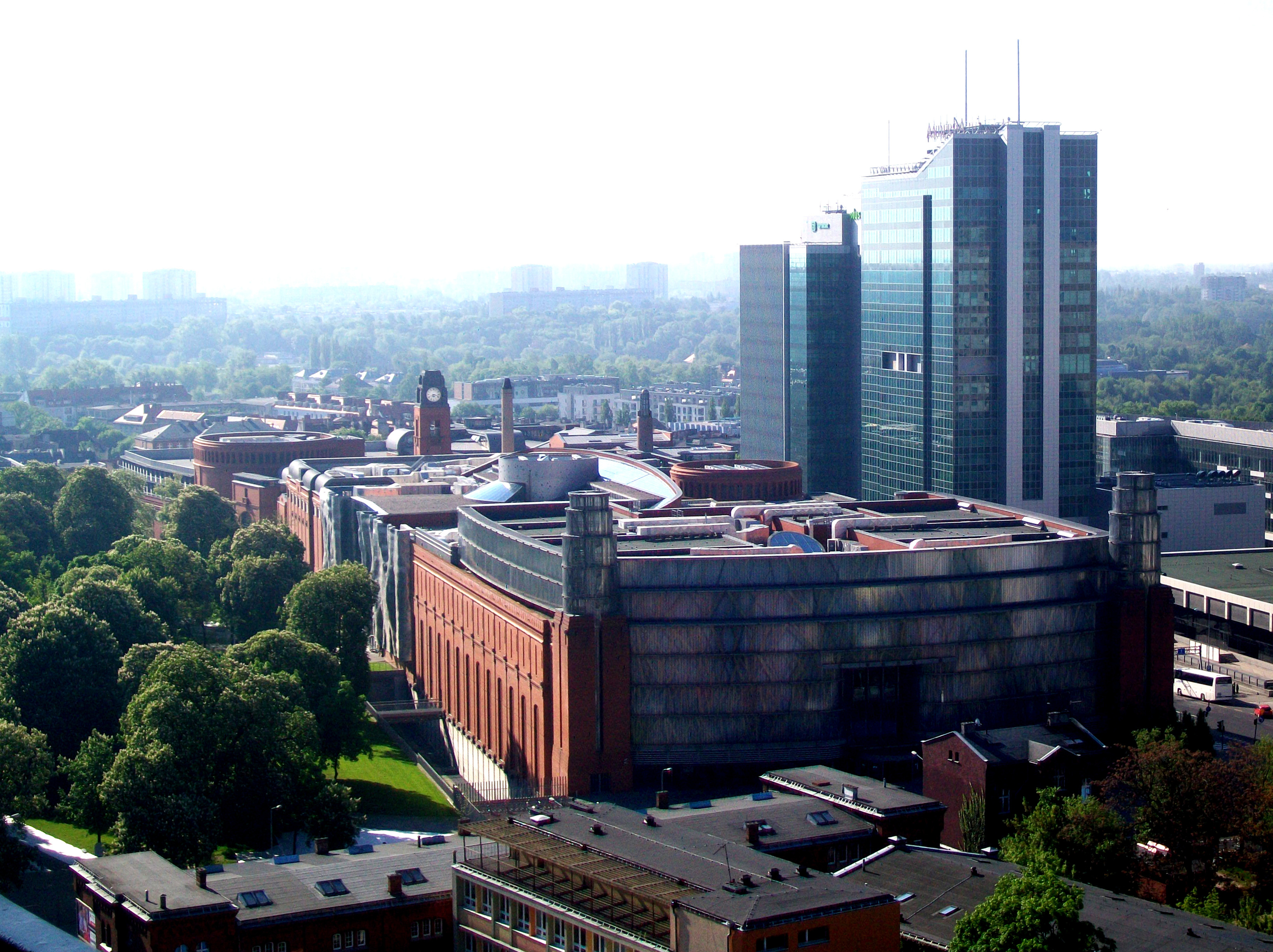
A view of Stary Browar, Poznań Financial Centre, and Andersia Tower from the Collegium Altum of the University of Economics

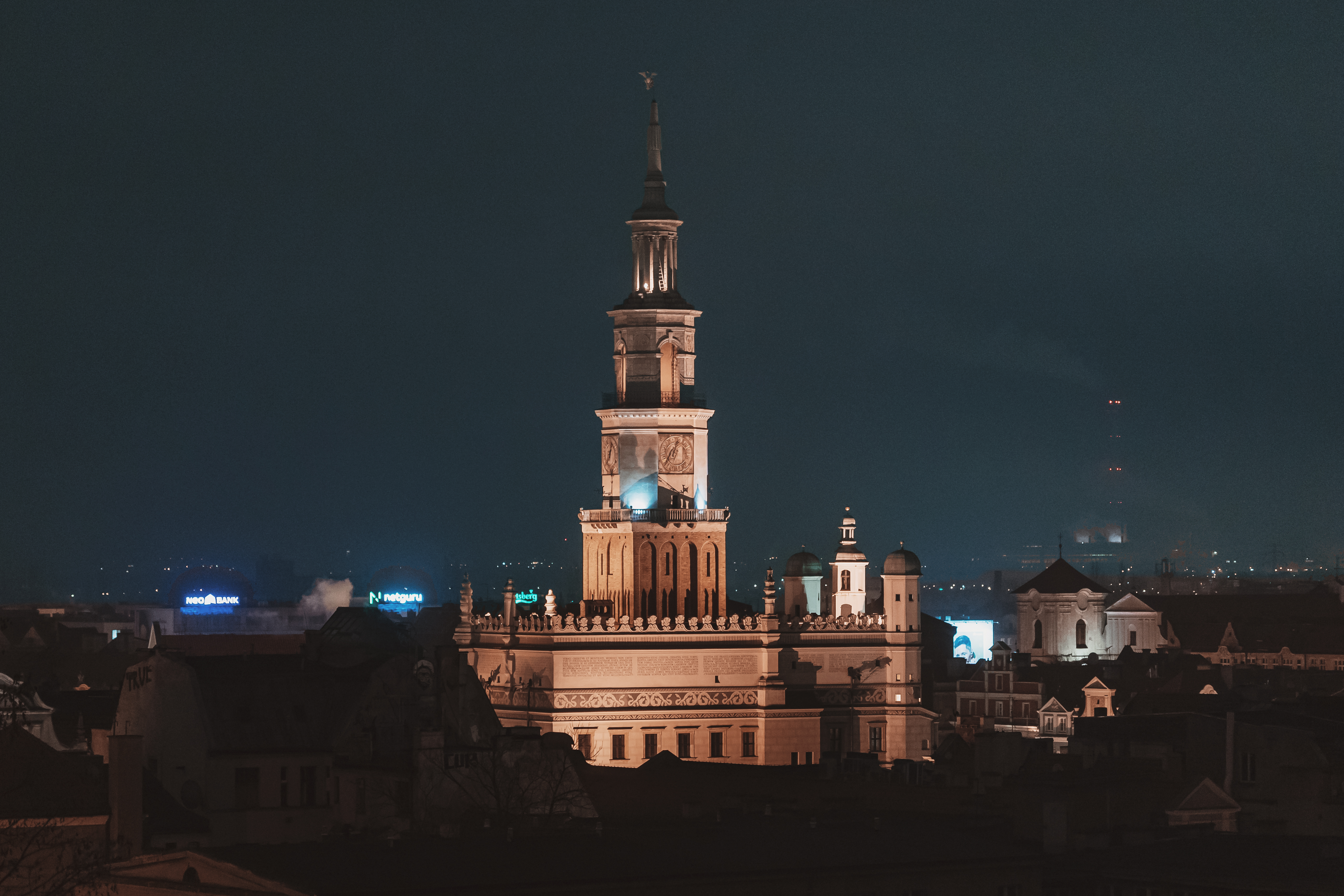
Town Hall, view from the south-west

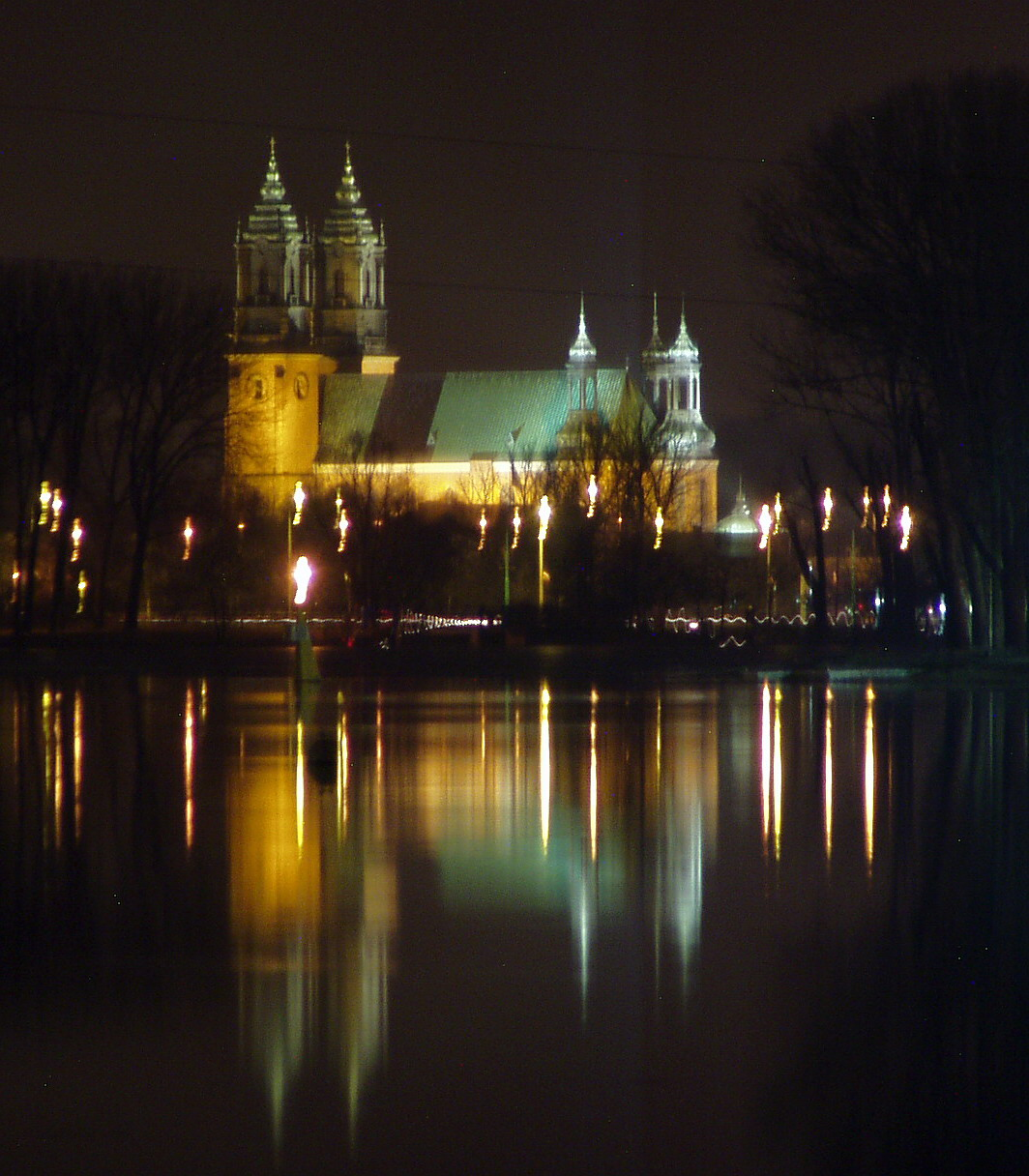
A view of Cathedra across the Warta river

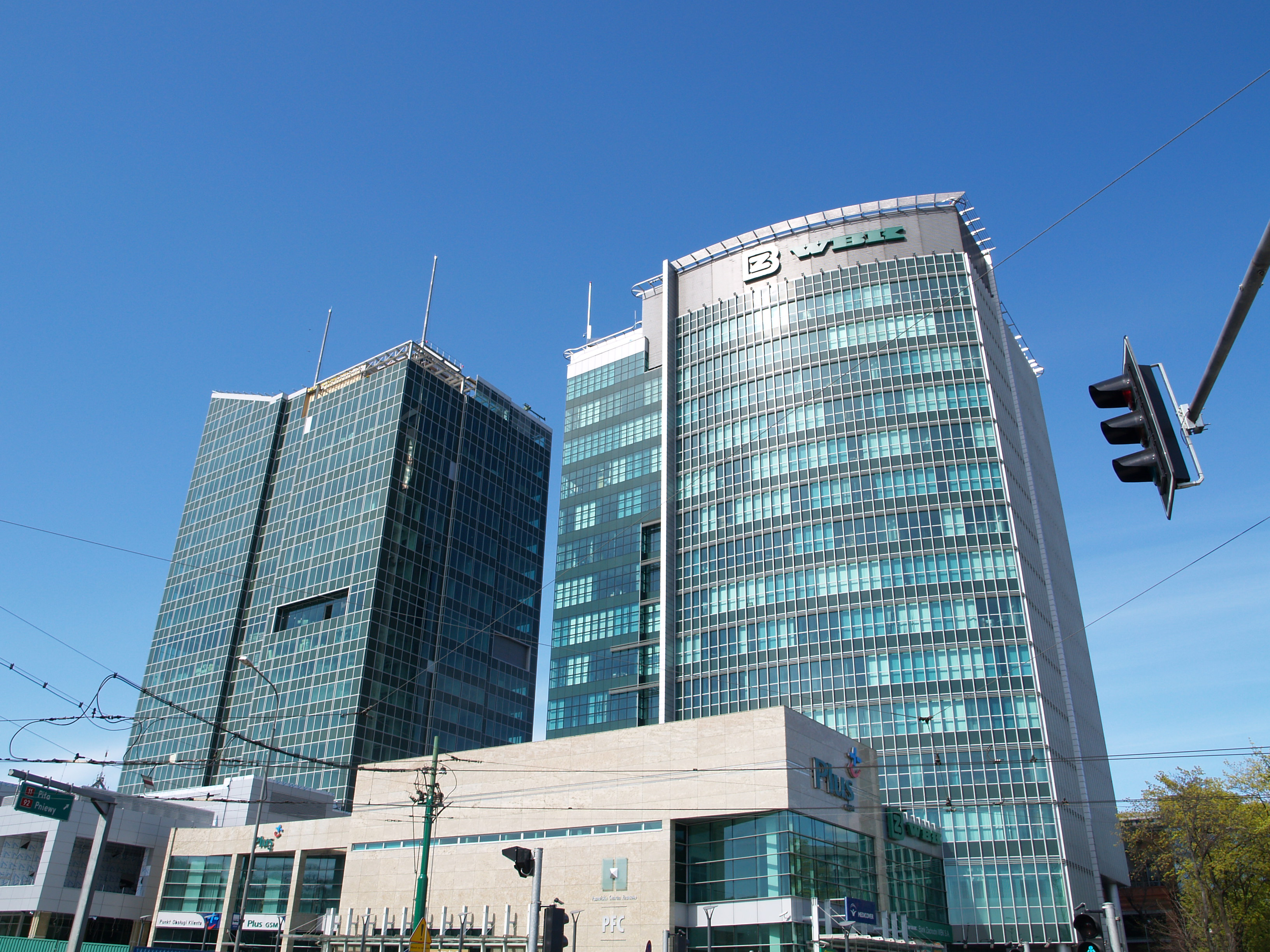
Andersia Tower and Poznań Financial Centre

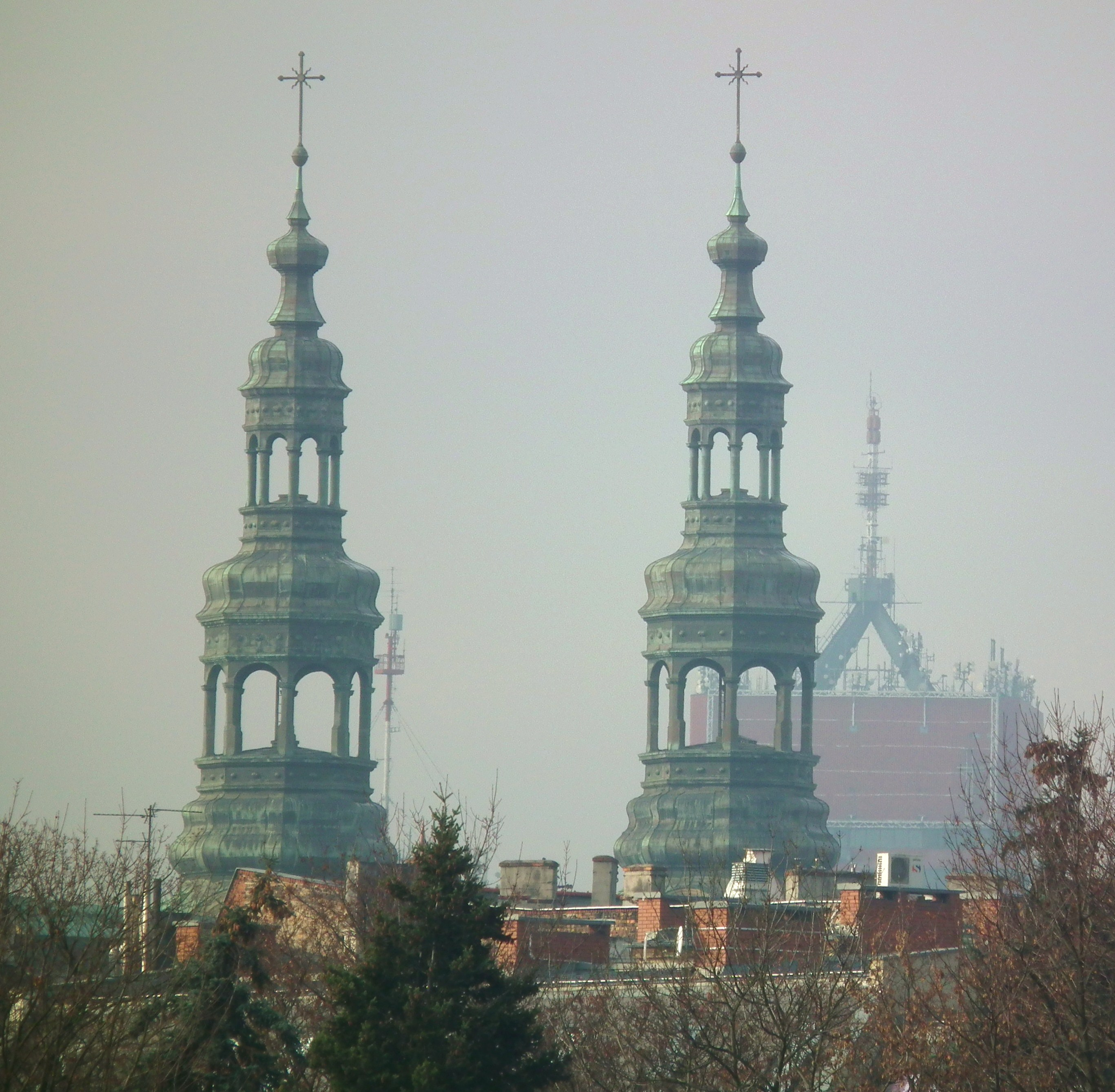
Saint Francis of Assisi church, towers with 29 metres domes

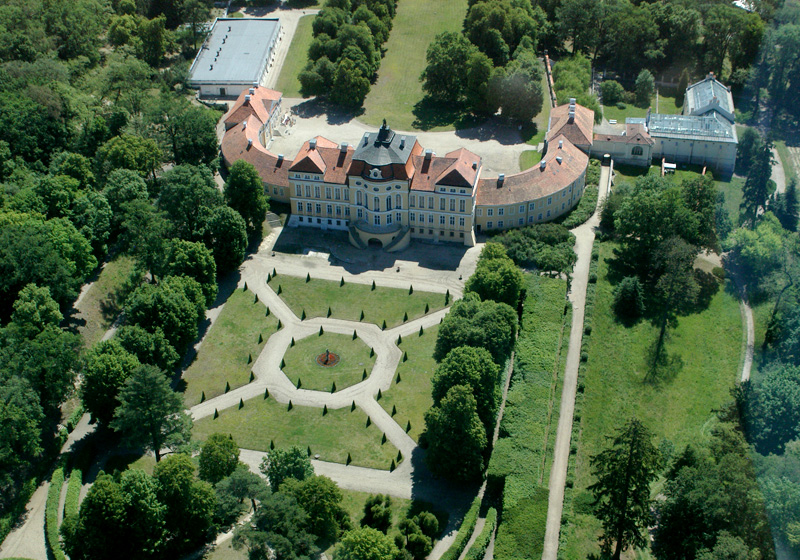
Aerial view of Raczyński Palace in Rogalin

== Religious buildings ==
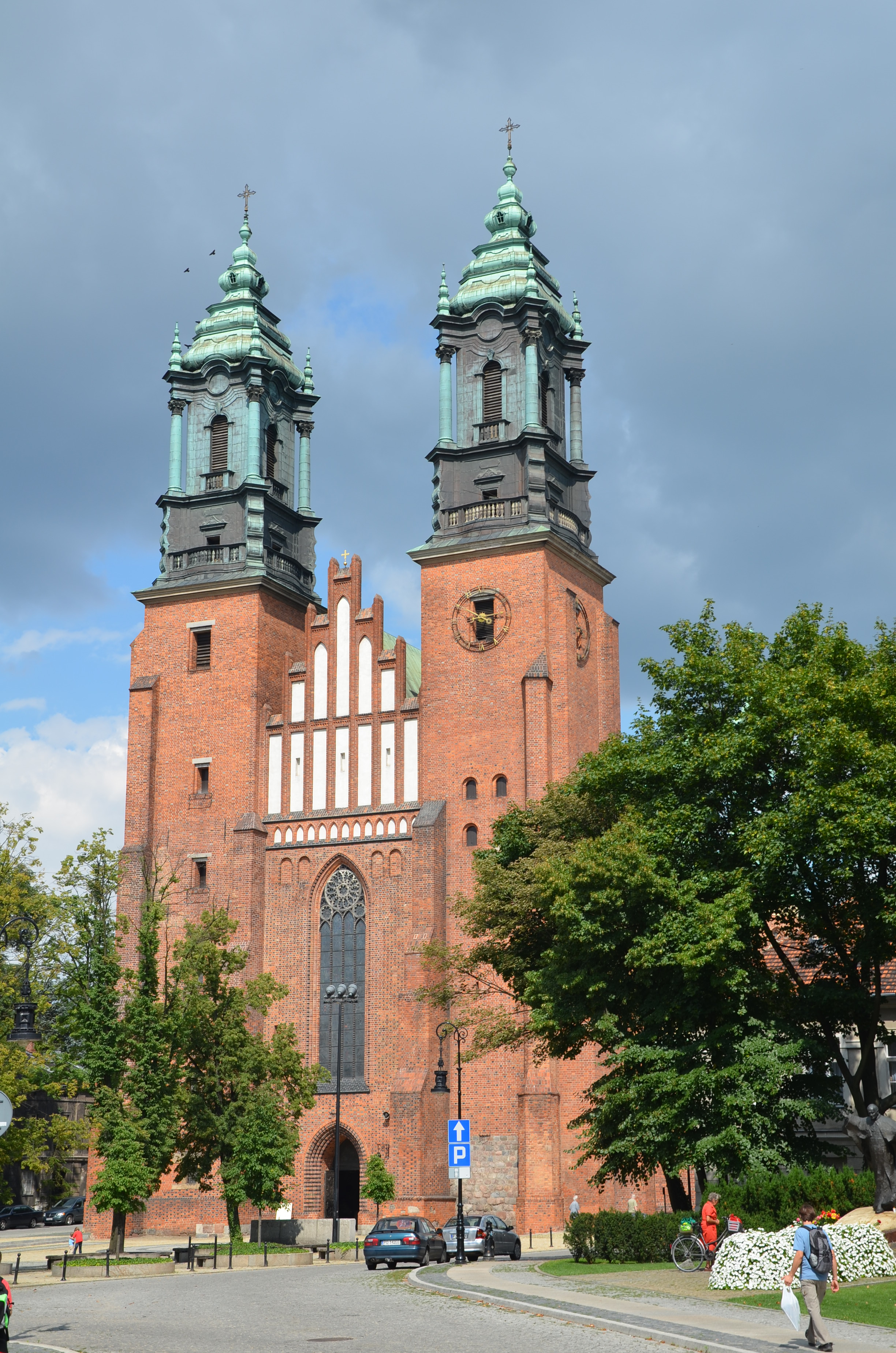
Archcathedral Basilica

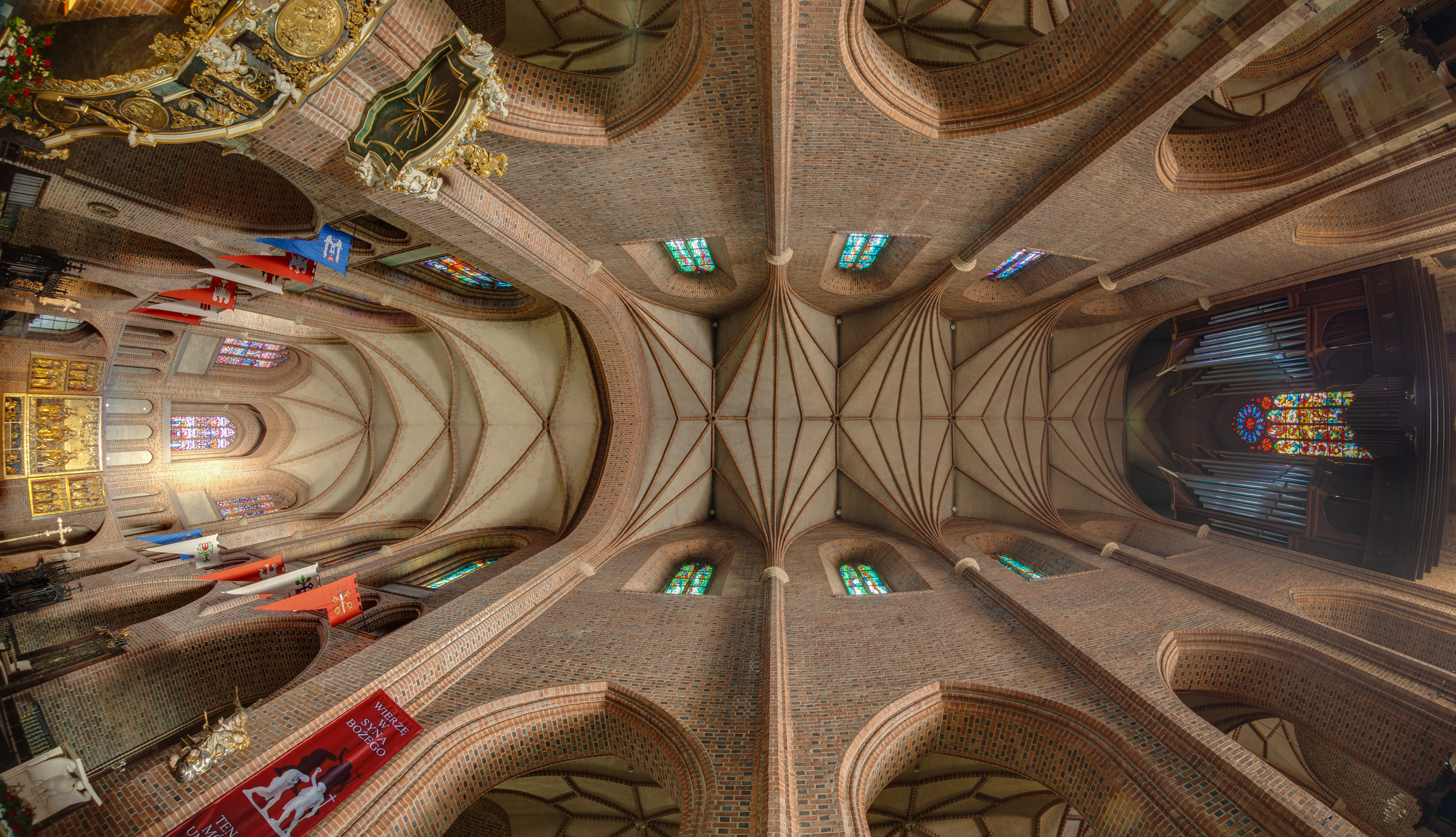
The interior of the Cathedra

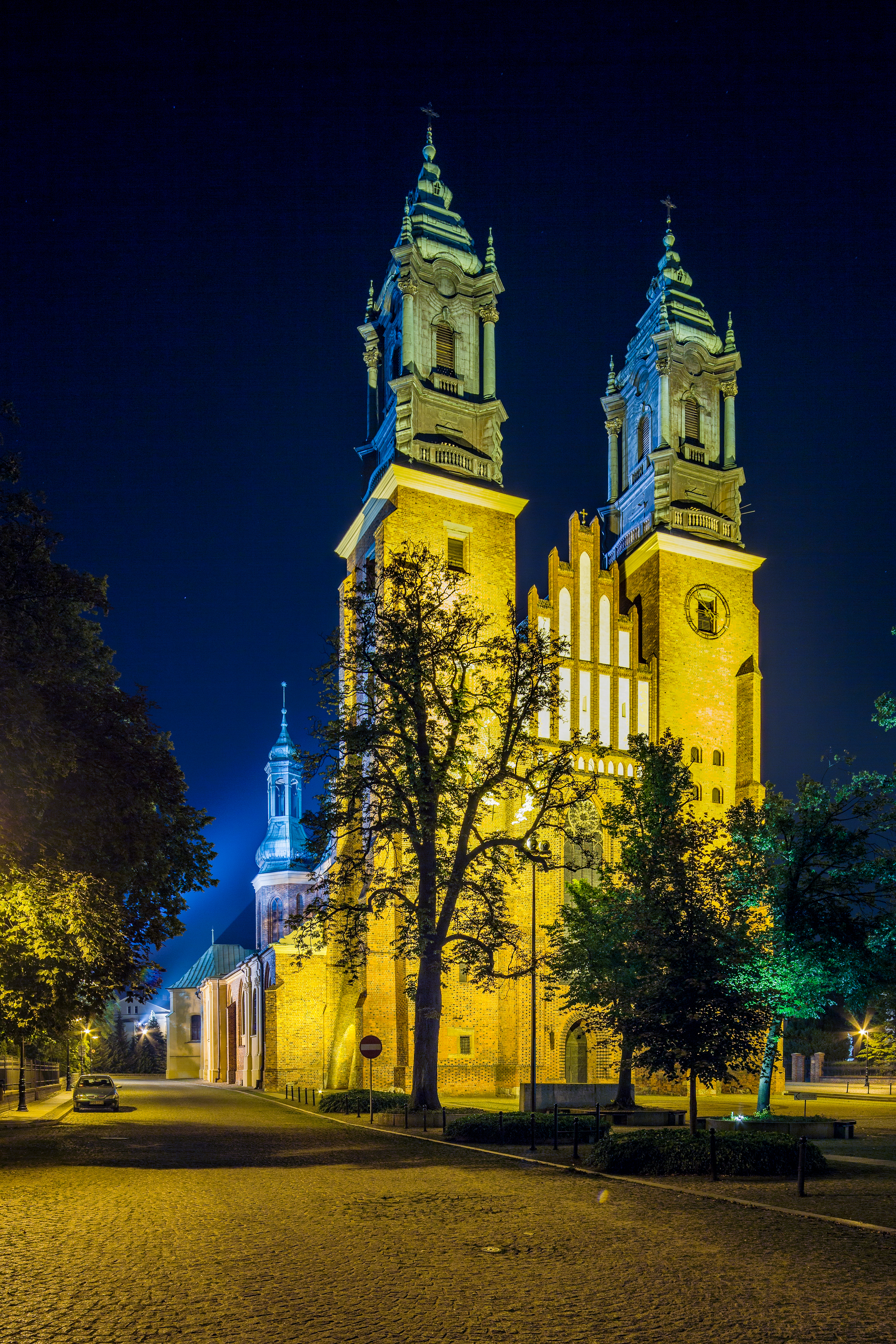
The Cathedra at night

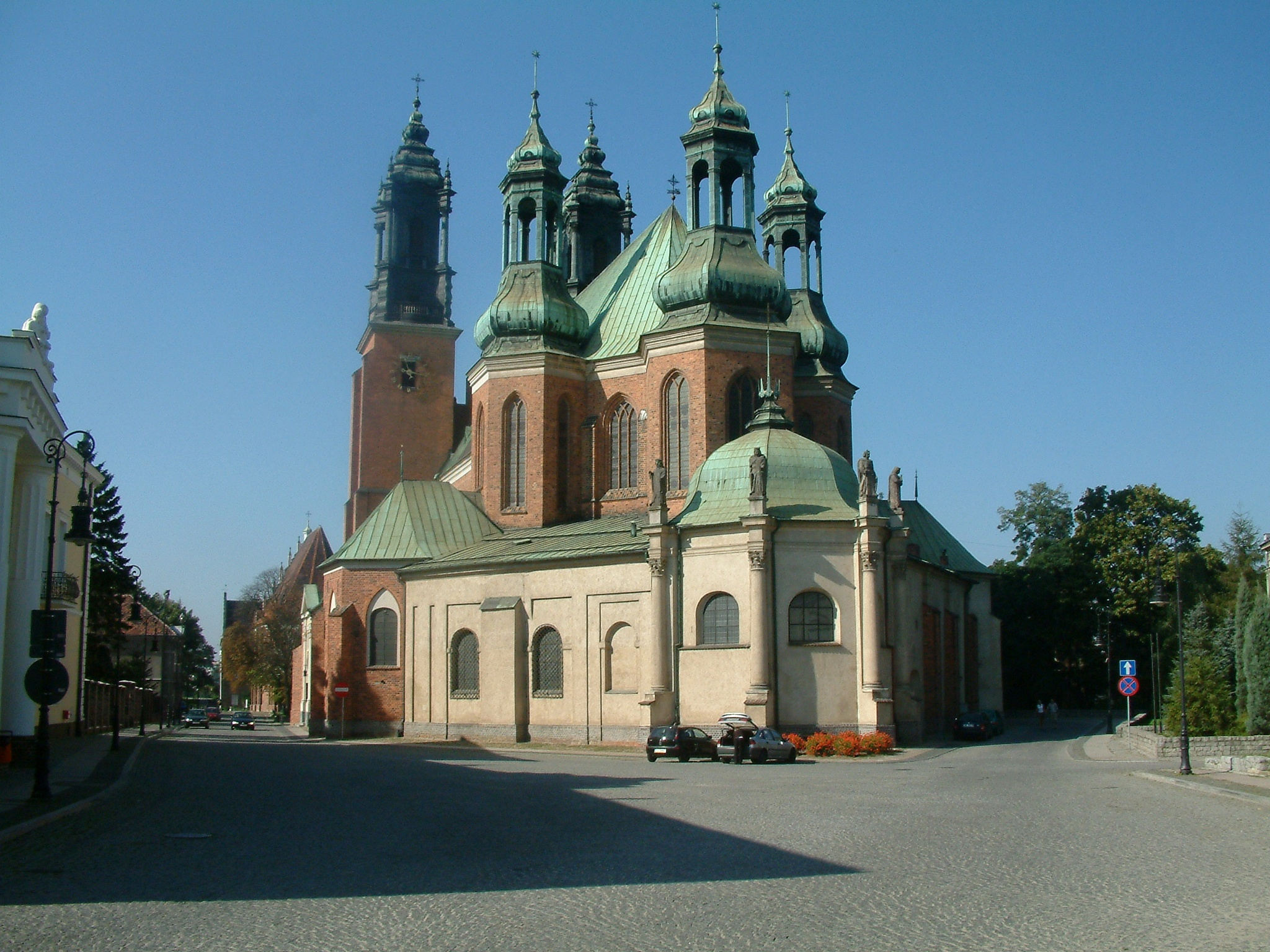
Eastern view of the Cathedral

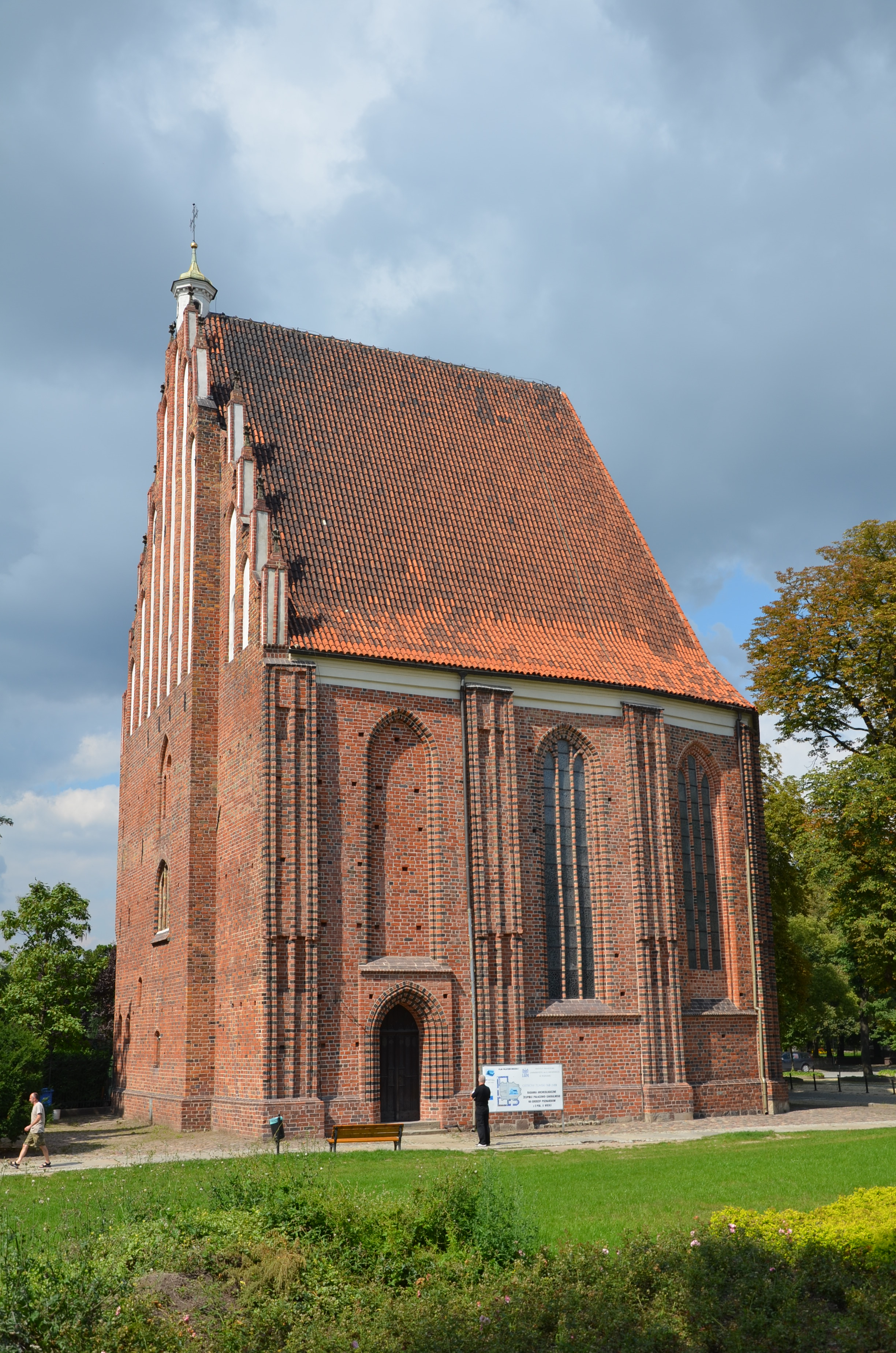
Church of the Most Holy Virgin Mary

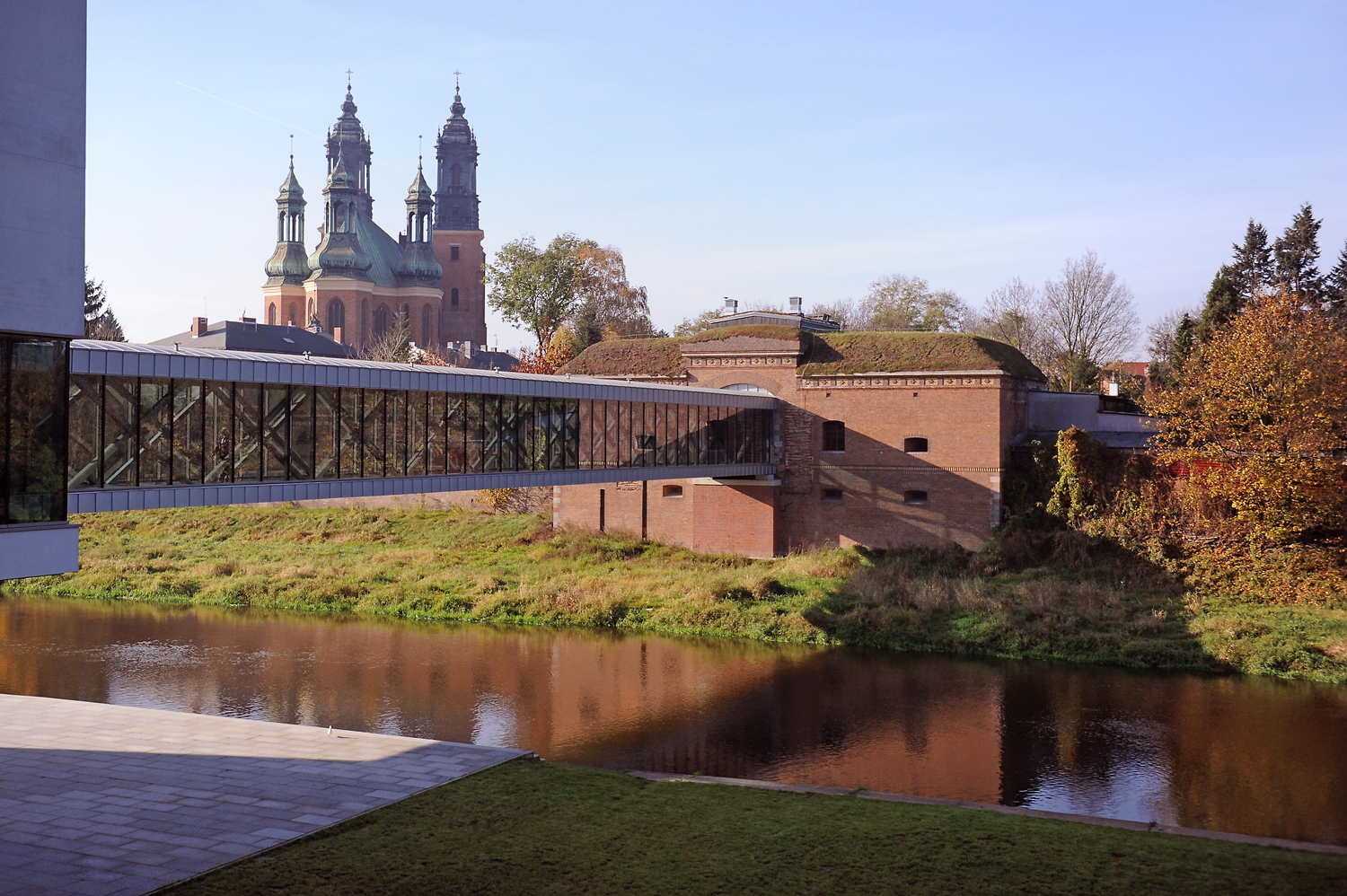
Cathedral Lock

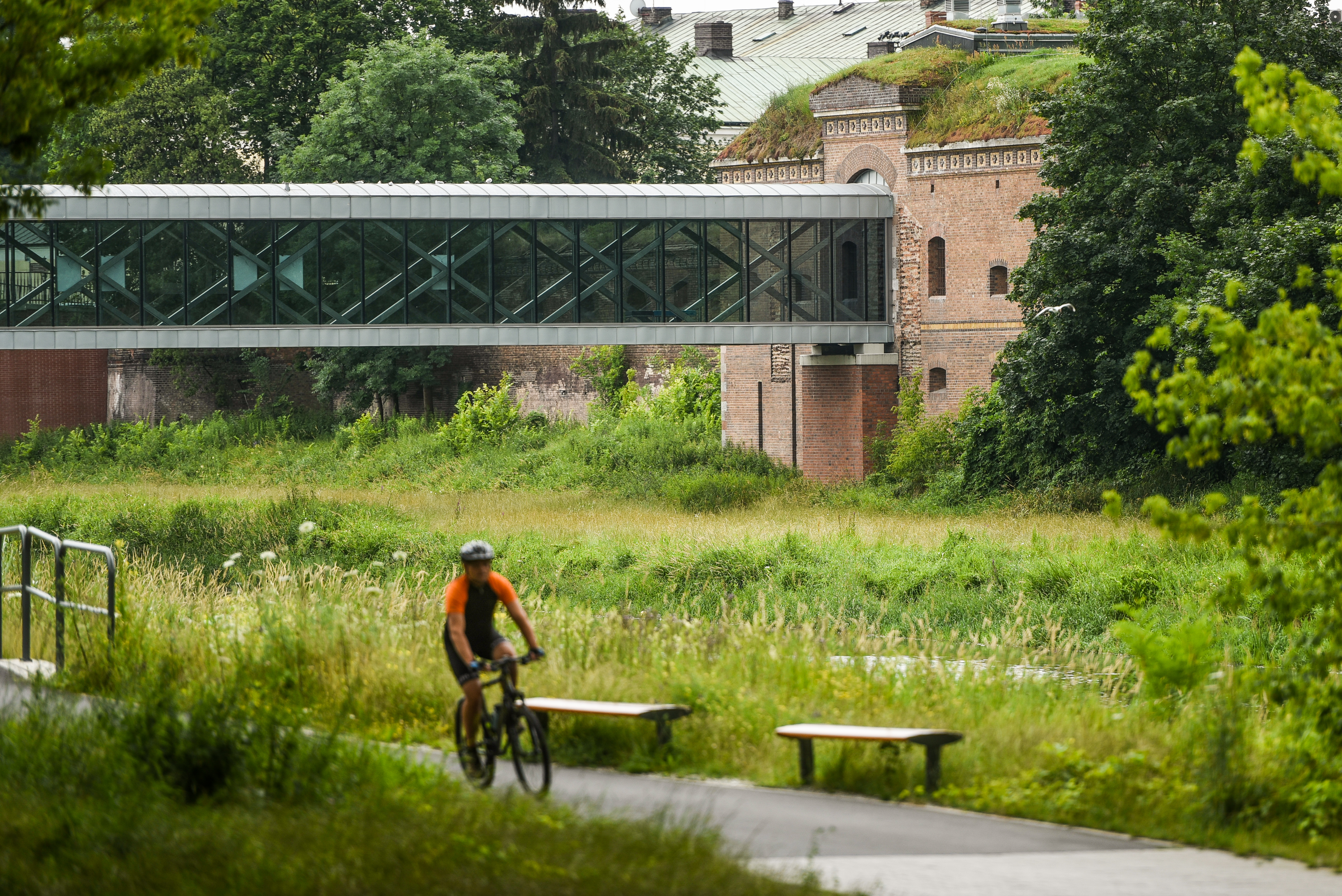
Cathedral Lock

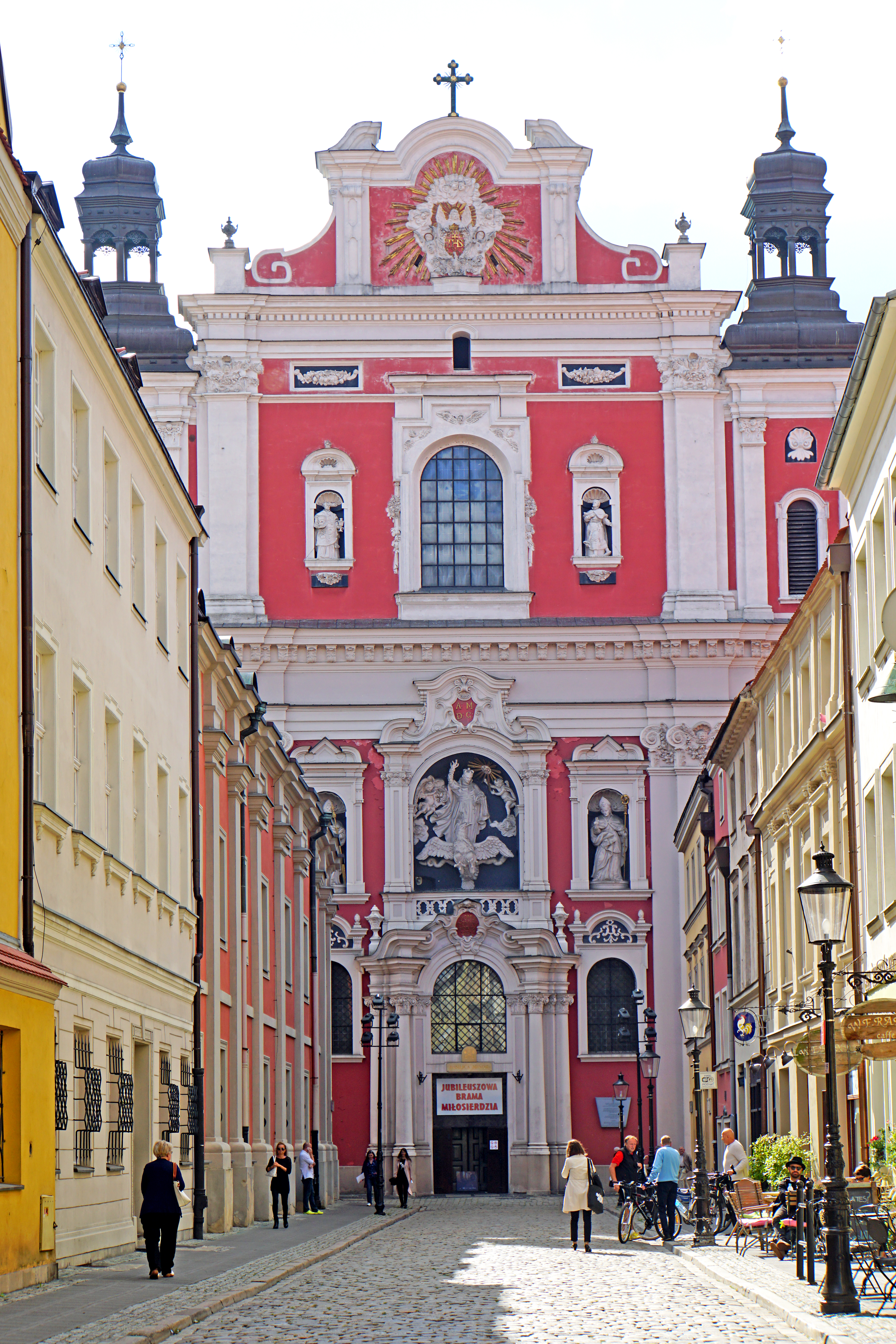
Parish Church or simply Fara basilica

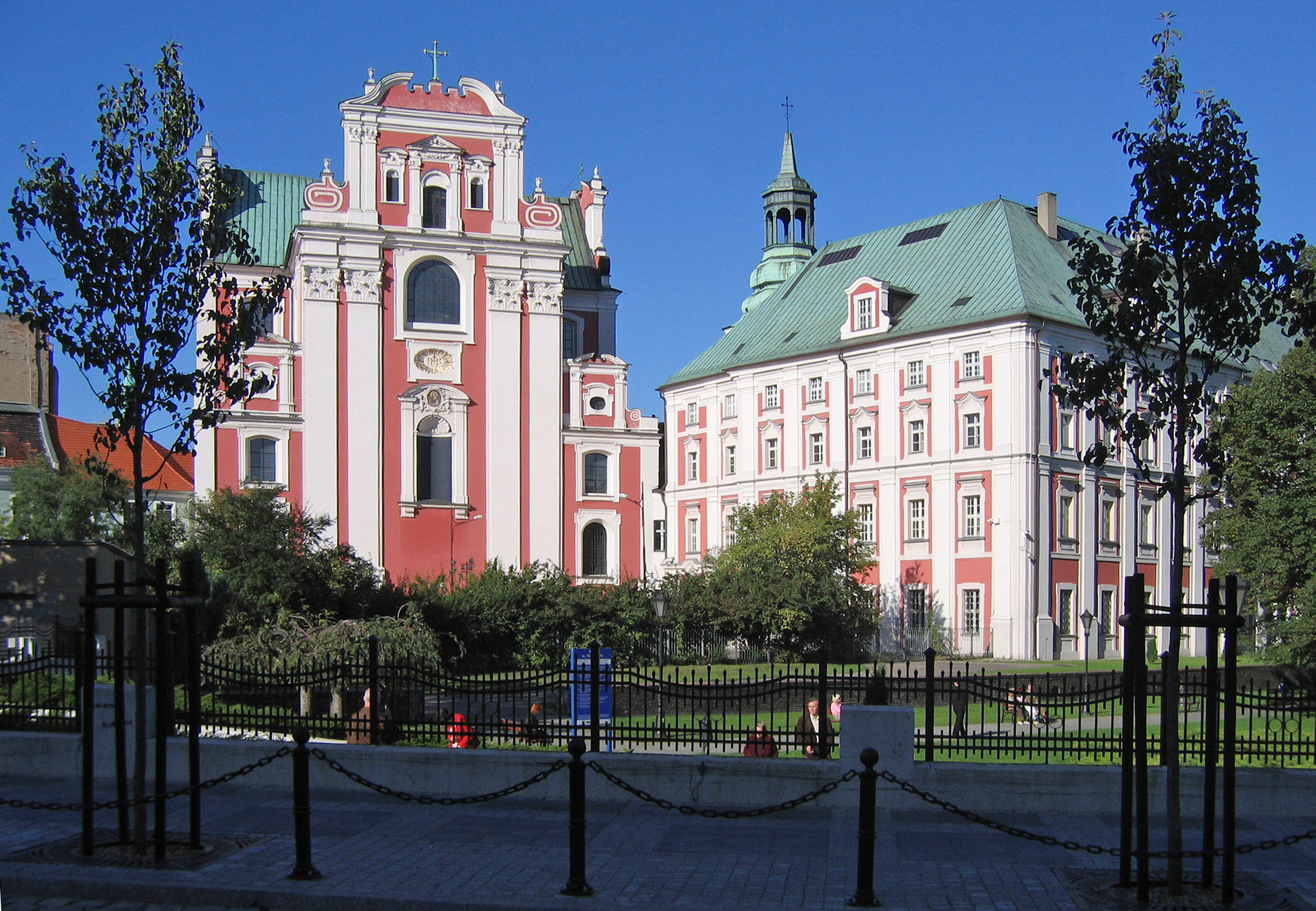
Fara seen from the northern (rear) side

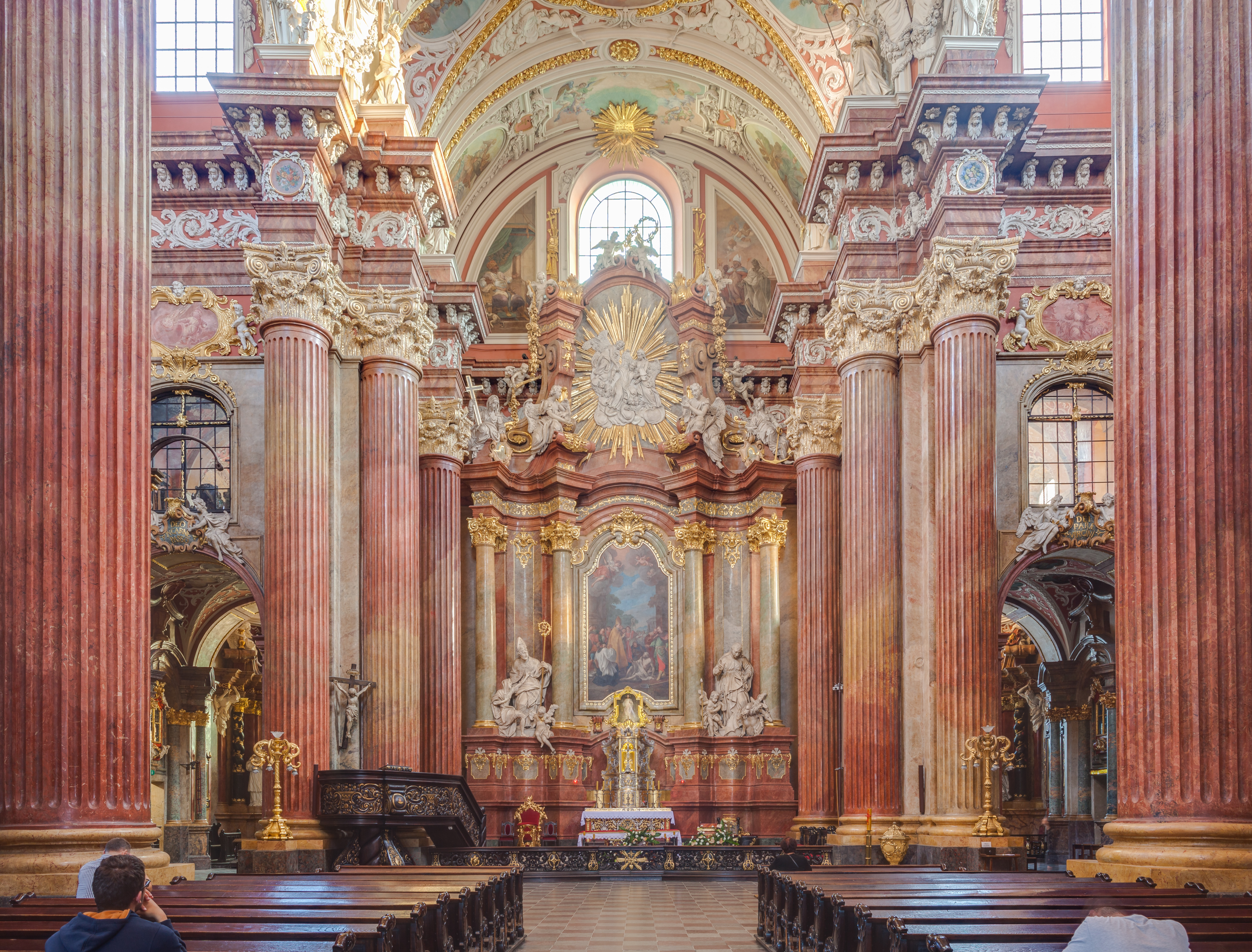
Fara's interior

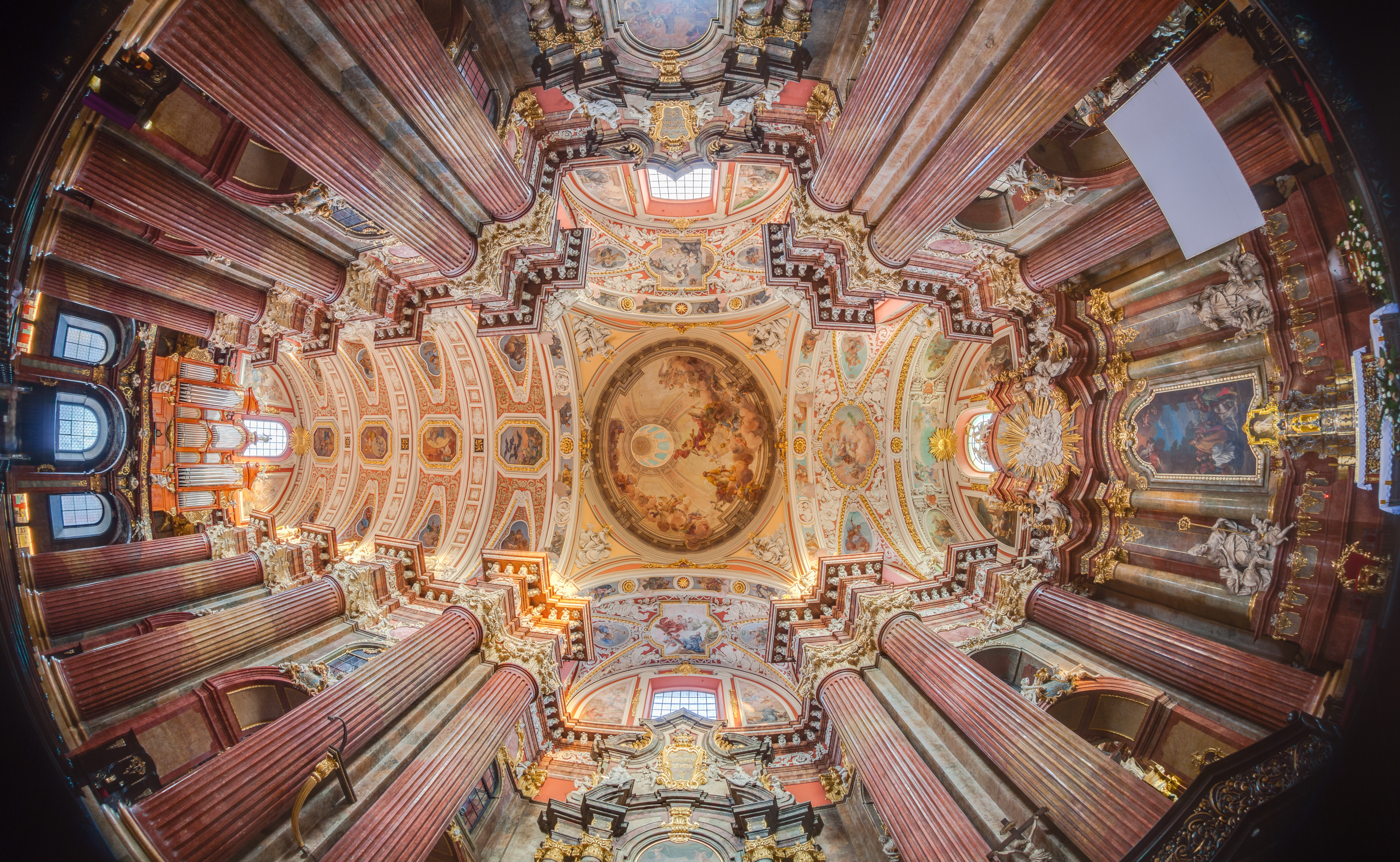
Fara's interior. One of the most stunning and best preserved examples of baroque architecture in Poland.

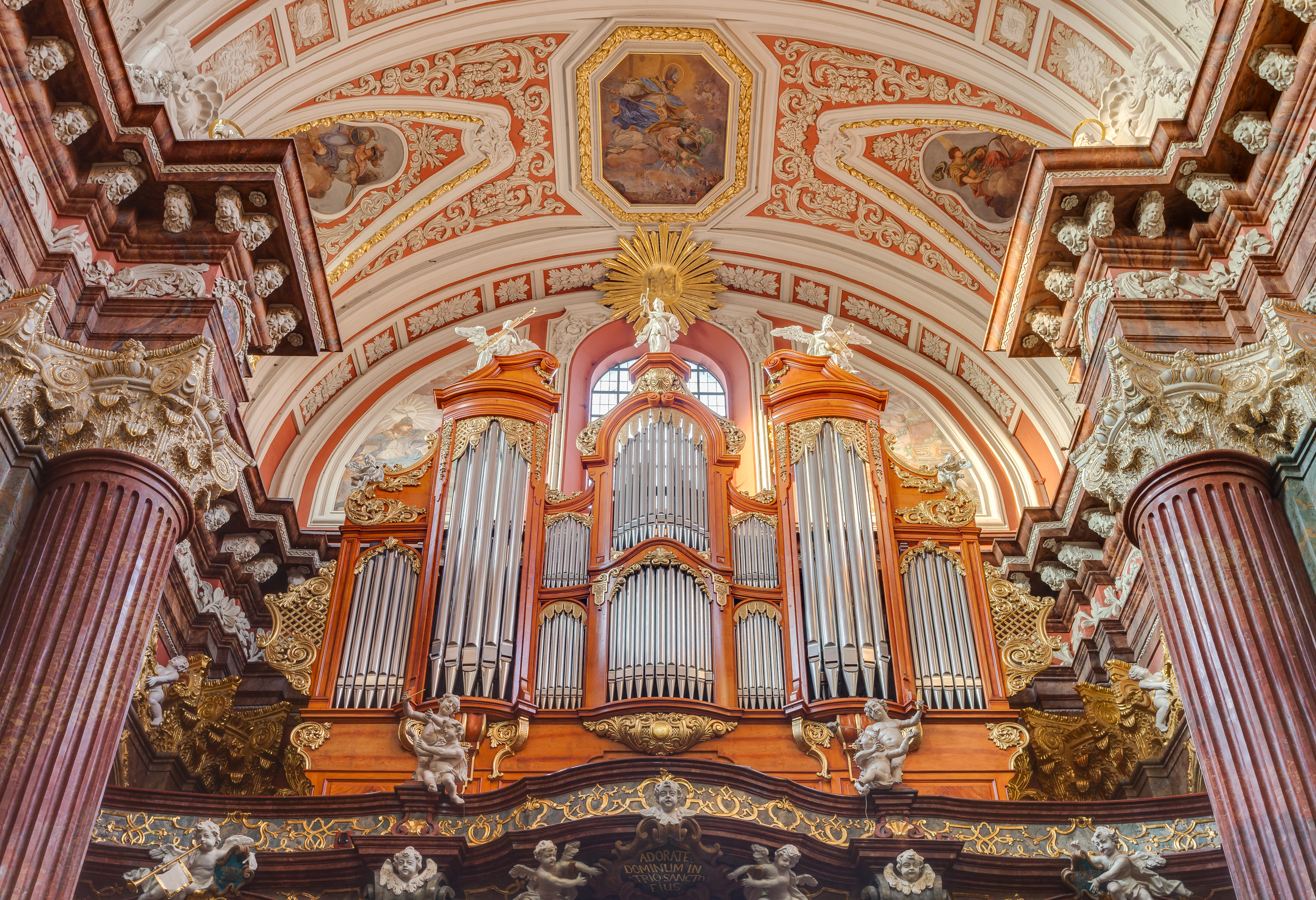
Fara's organs

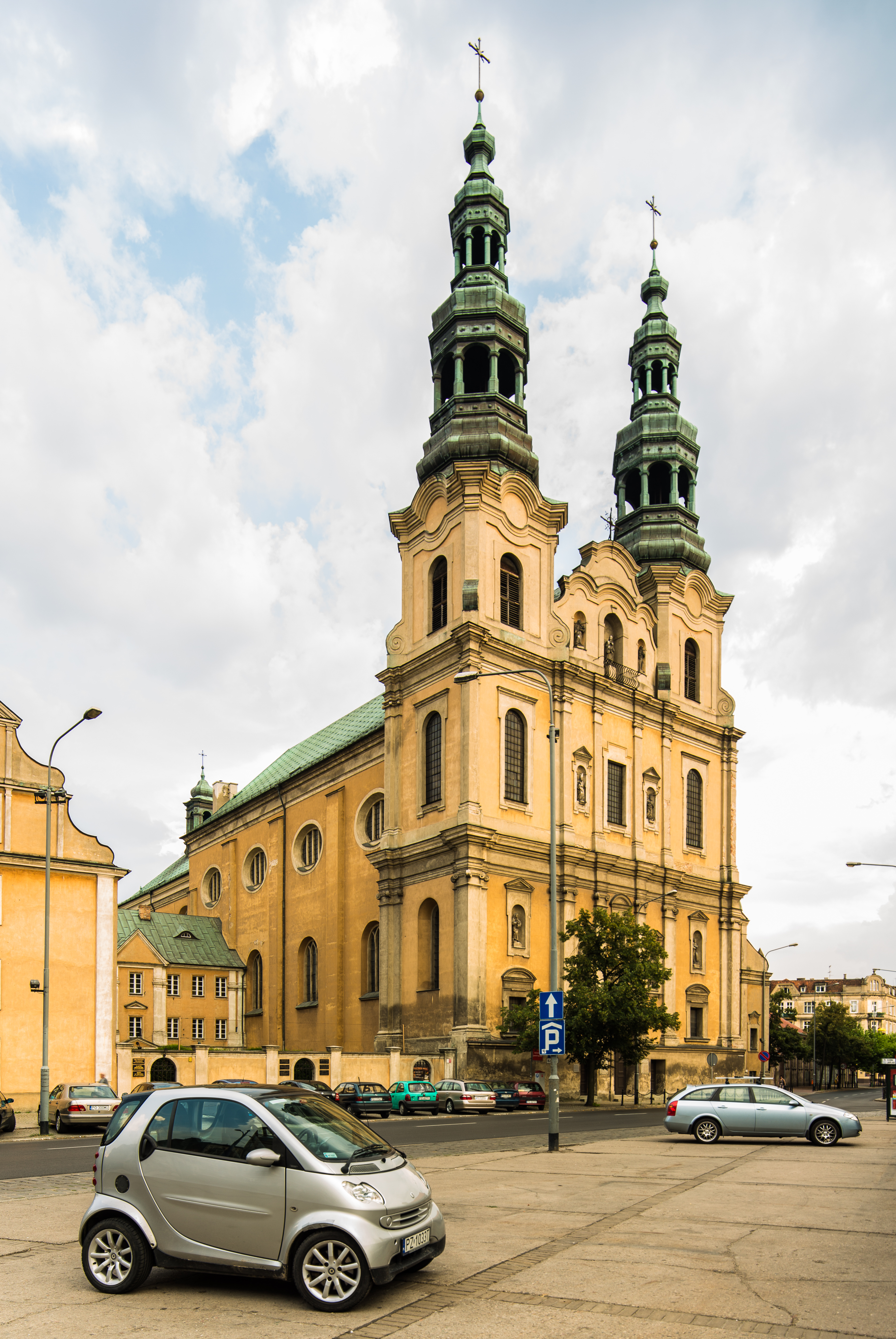
St Francis Seraphic Church

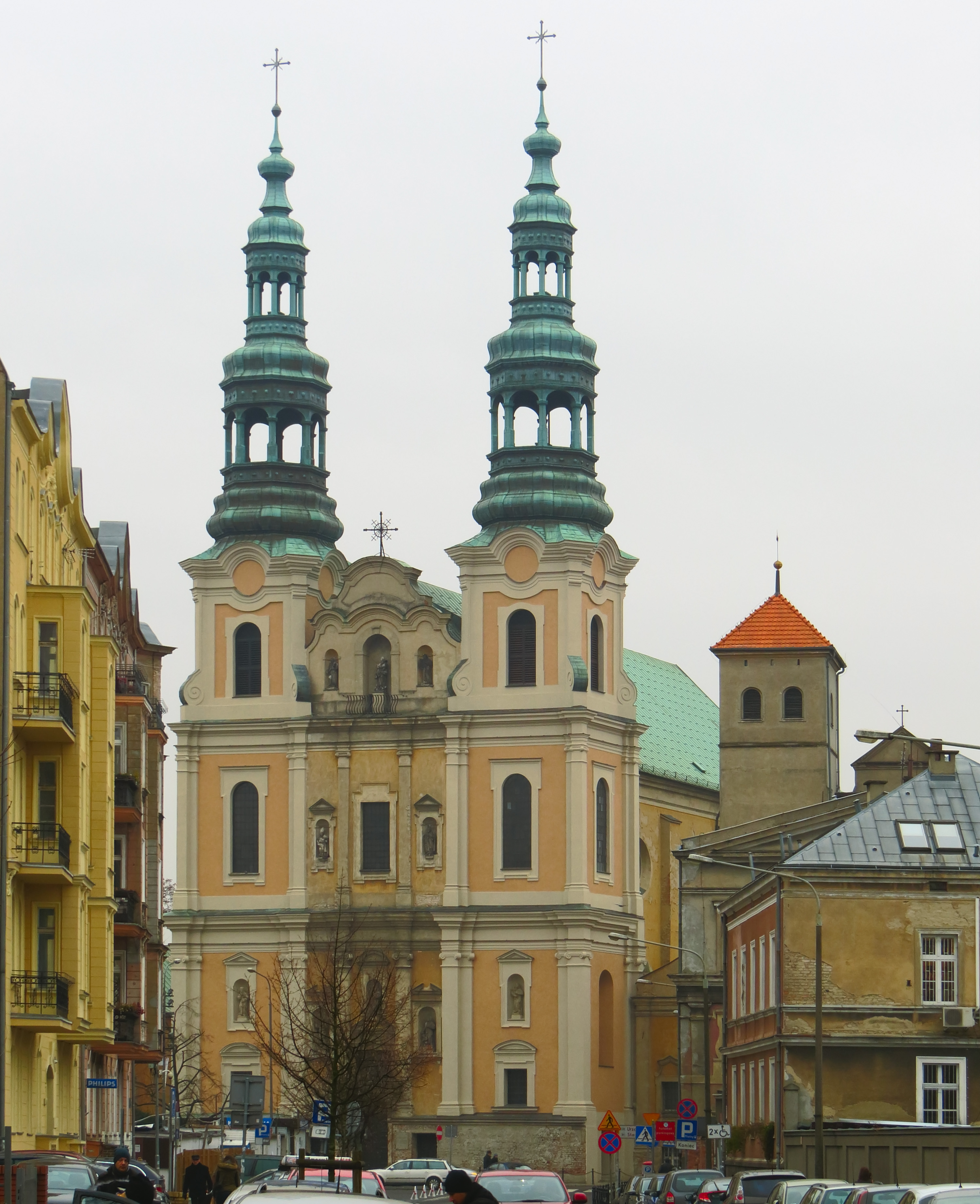
St Francis Seraphic Church

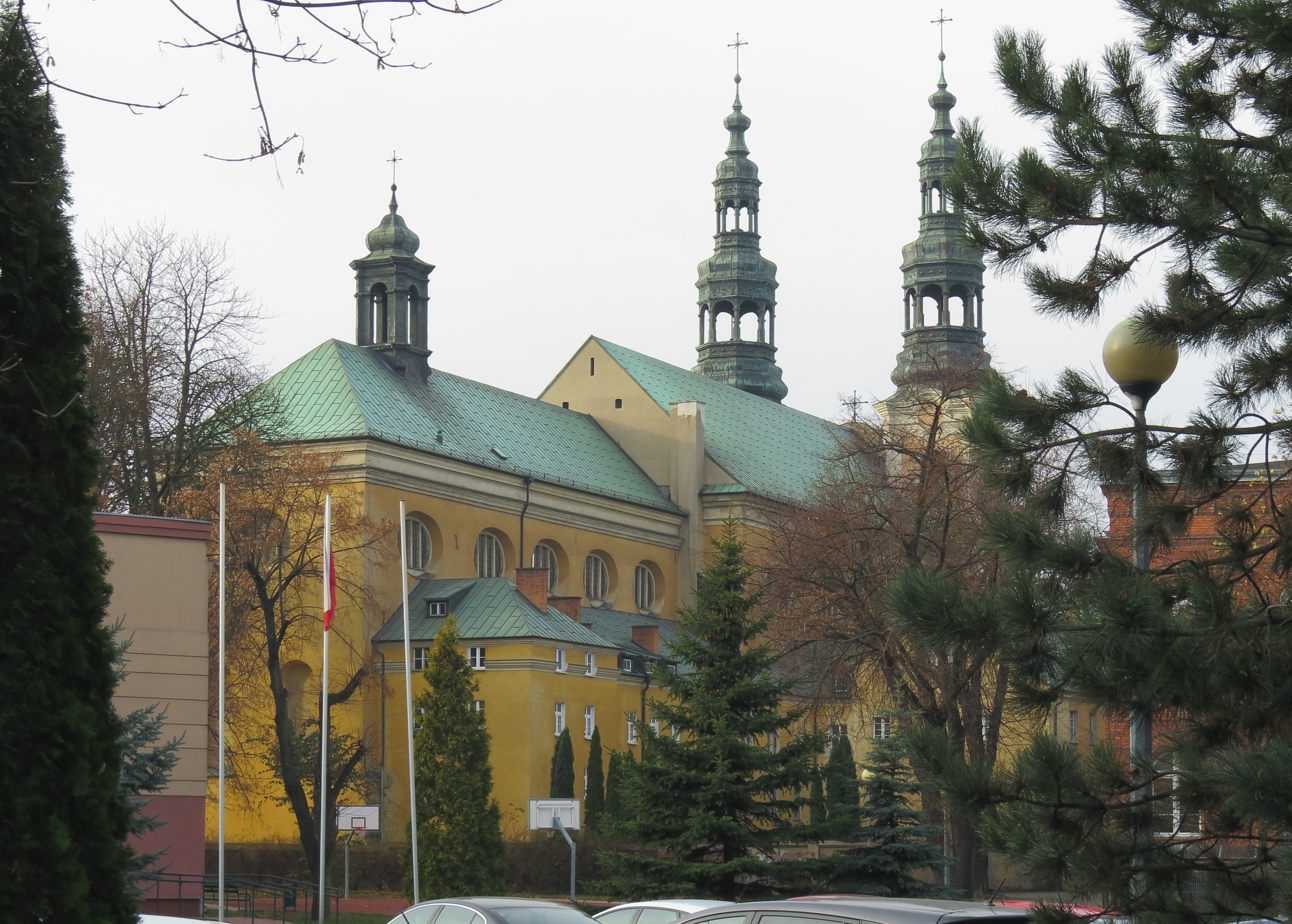
St Francis Seraphic Church, rear view

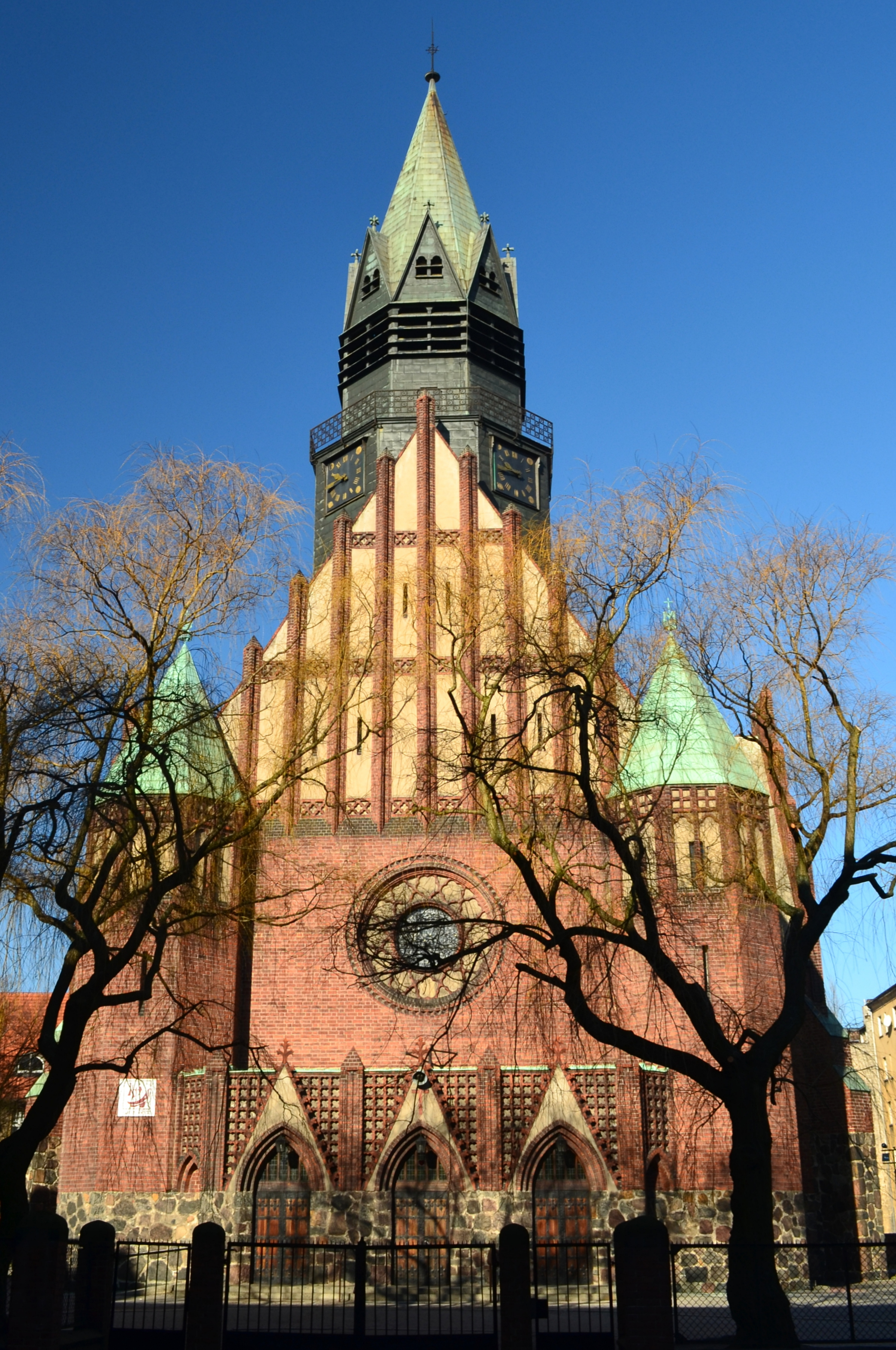
St Anna Church

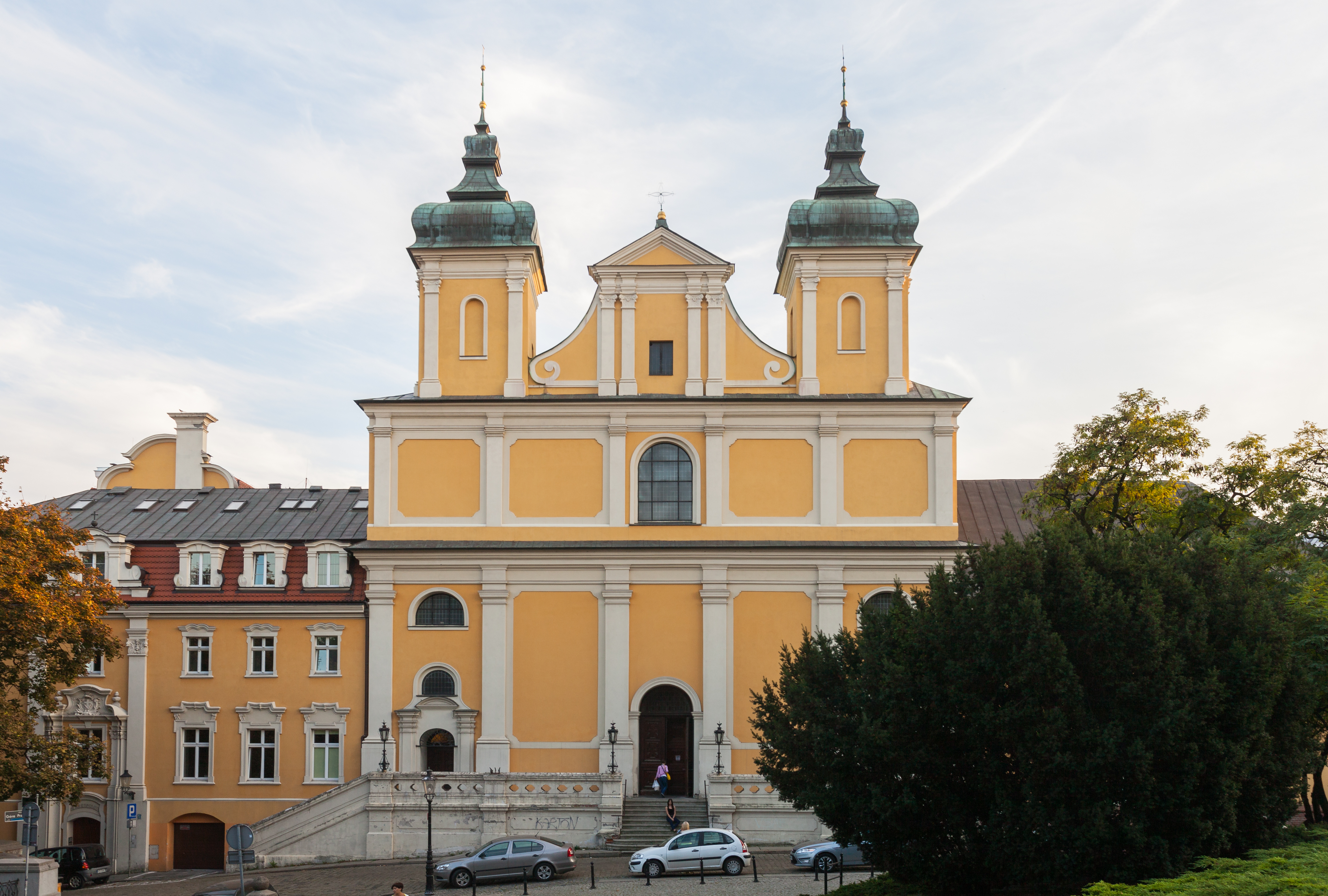
St Antoni Church

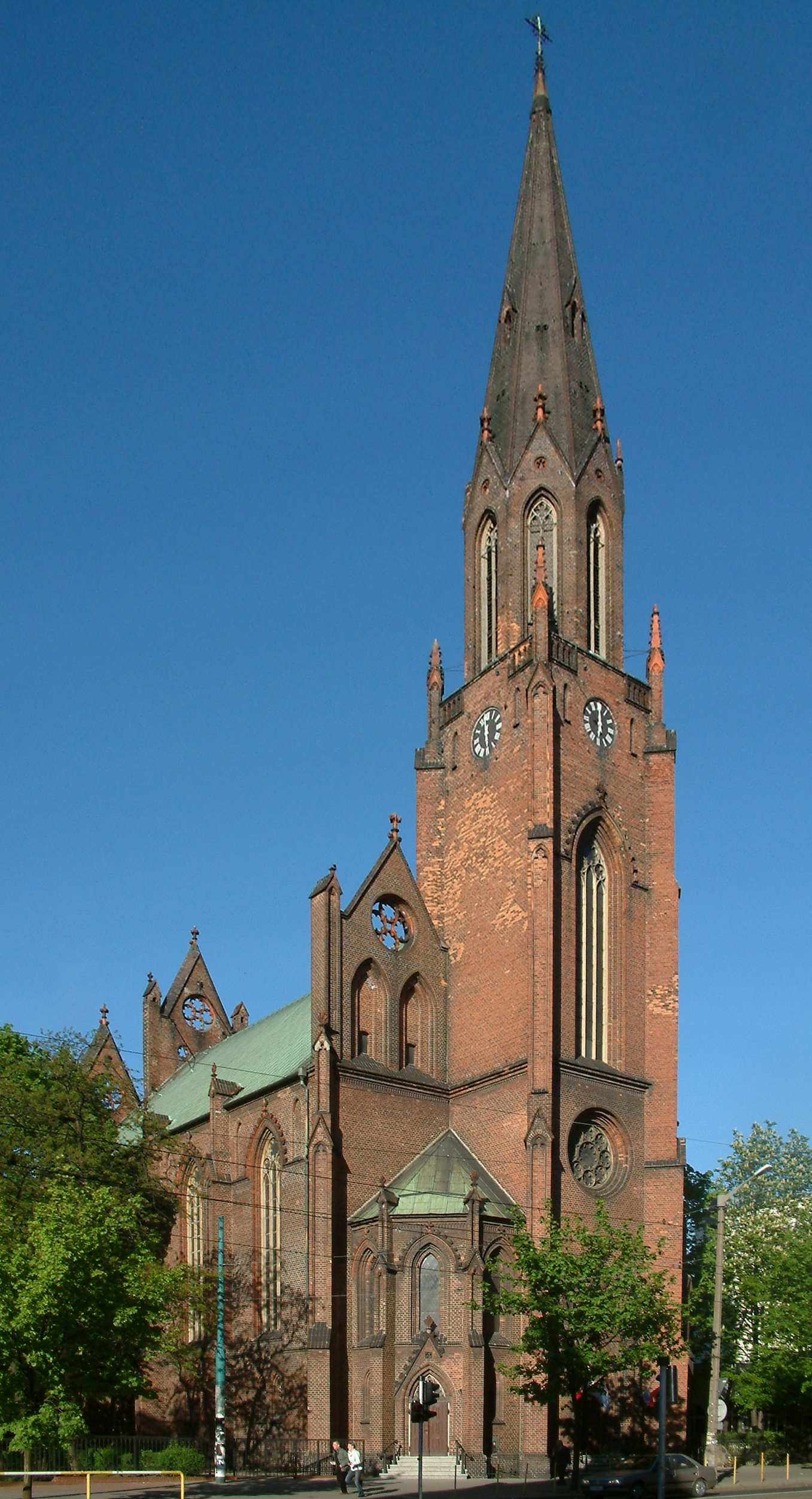
The Church of the Holliest Savior

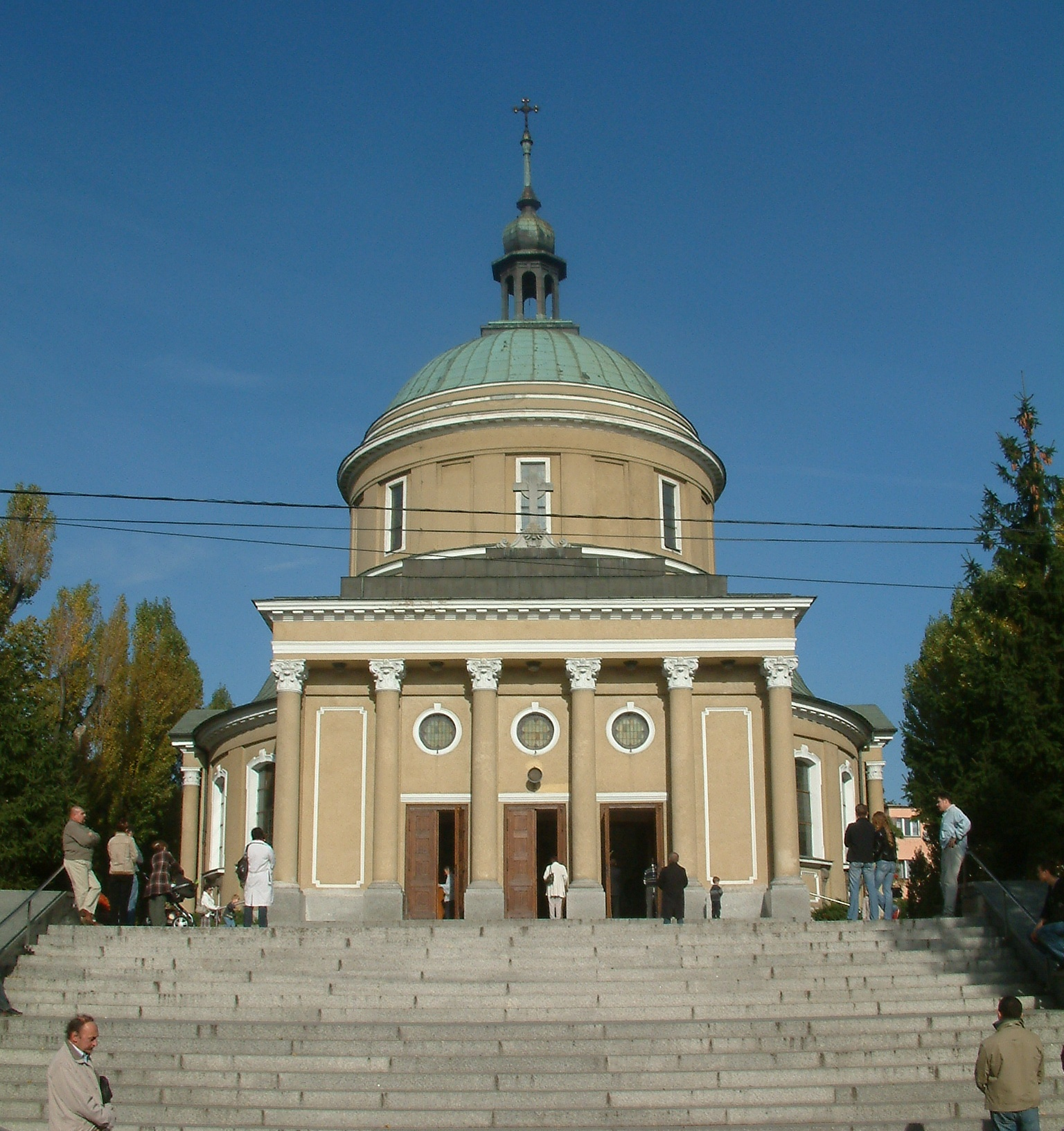
St Jan Vianney Church

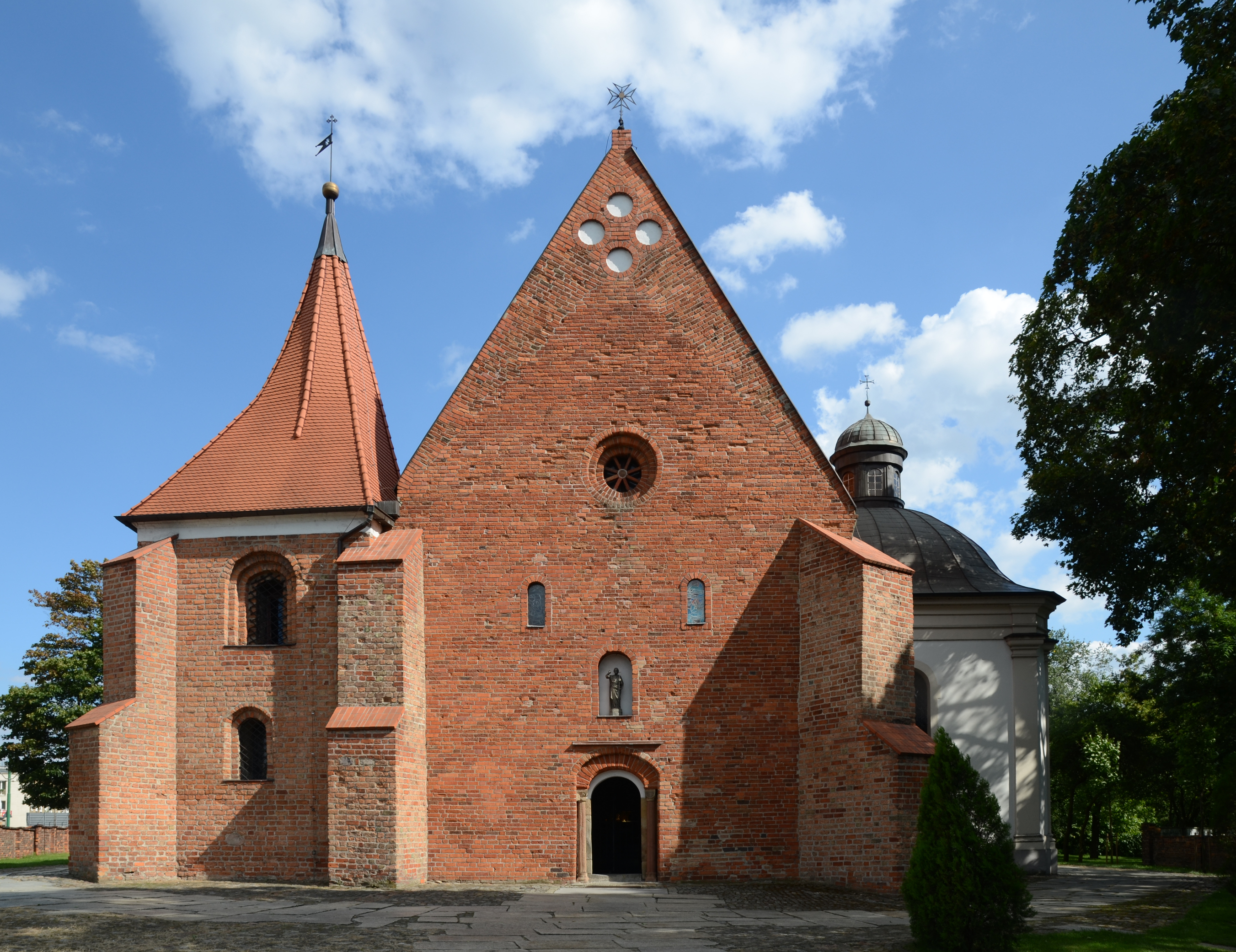
Church of Saint John of Jerusalem outside the walls

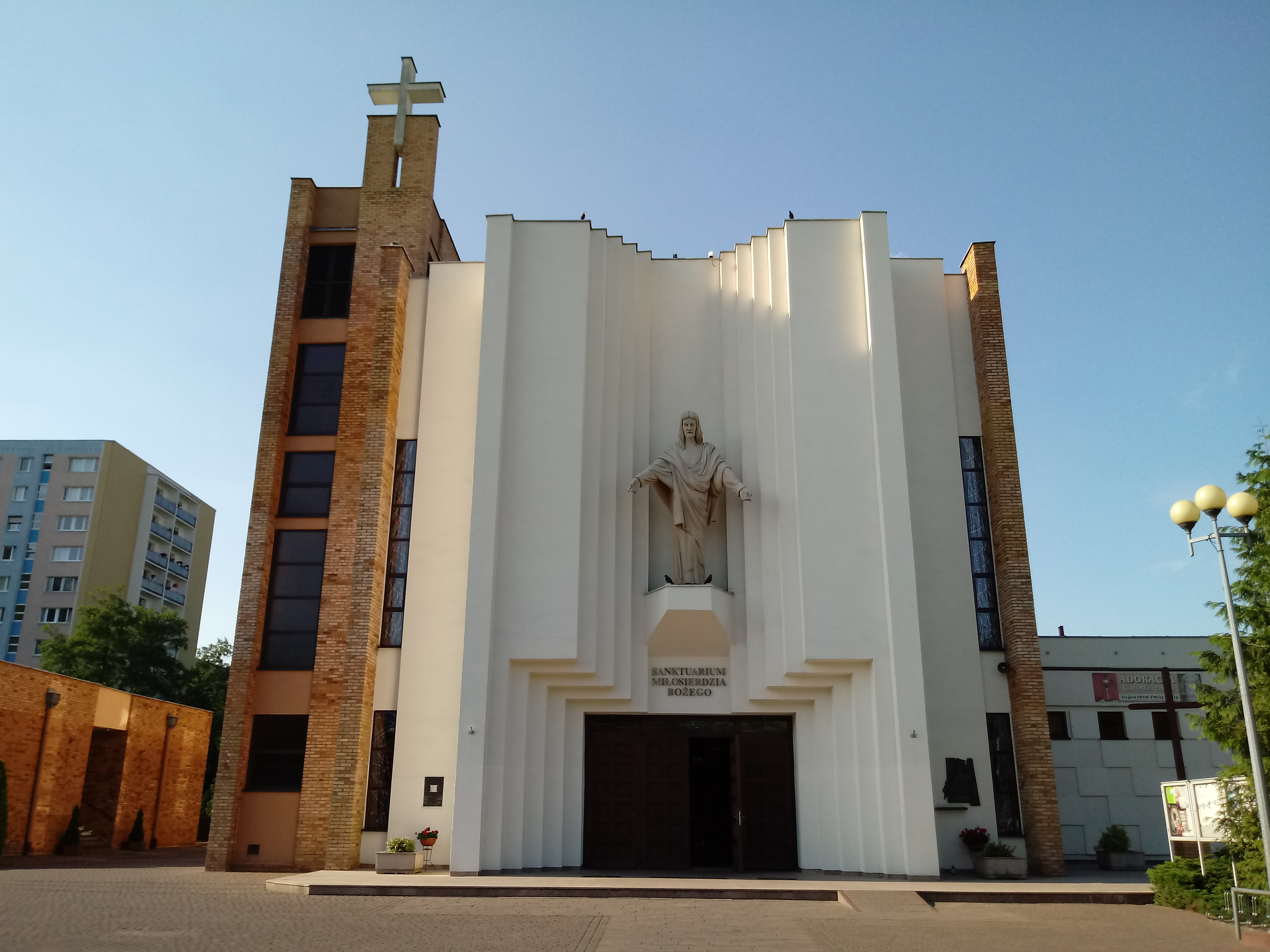
Church of Divine Mercy

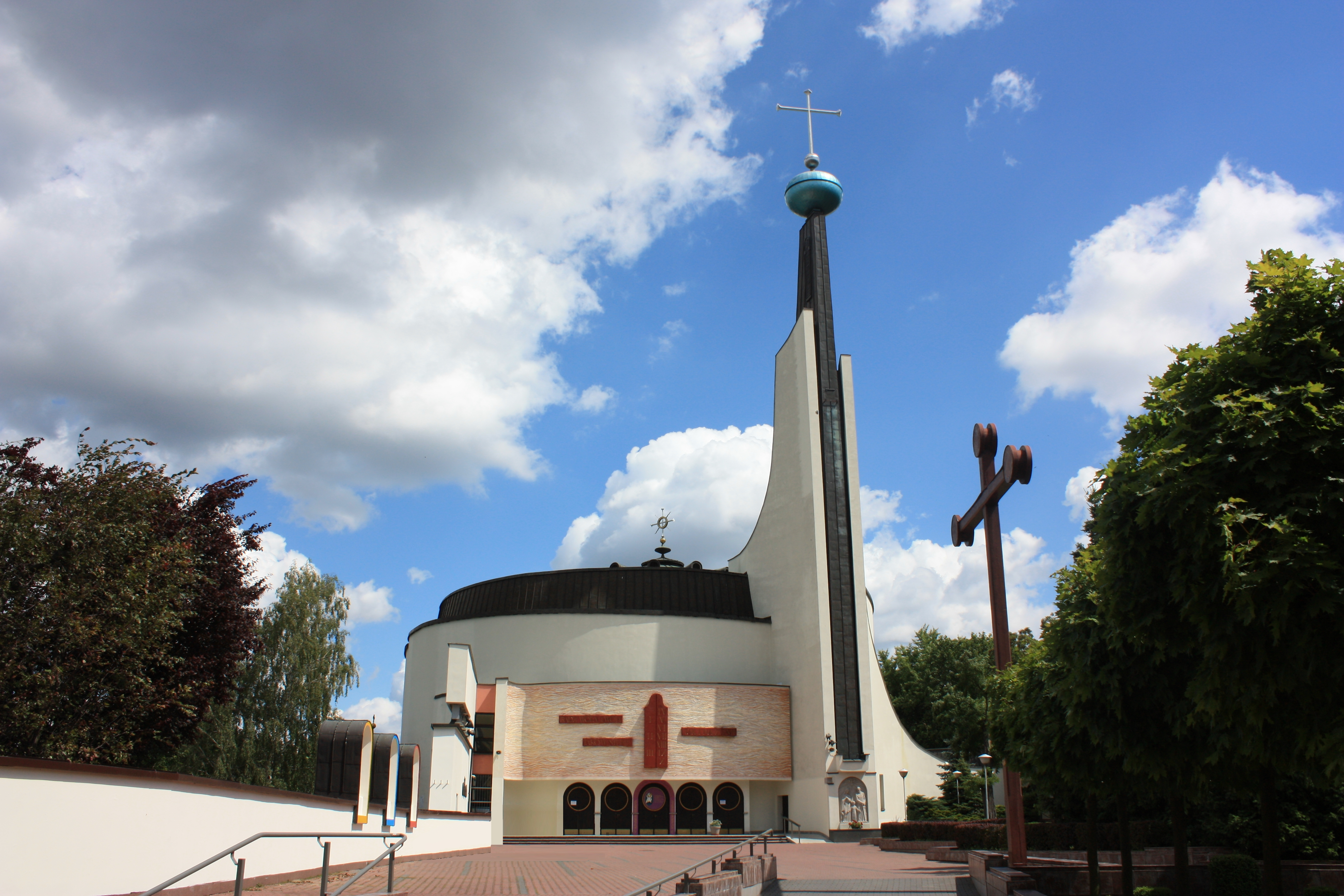
The Church of Holy Family

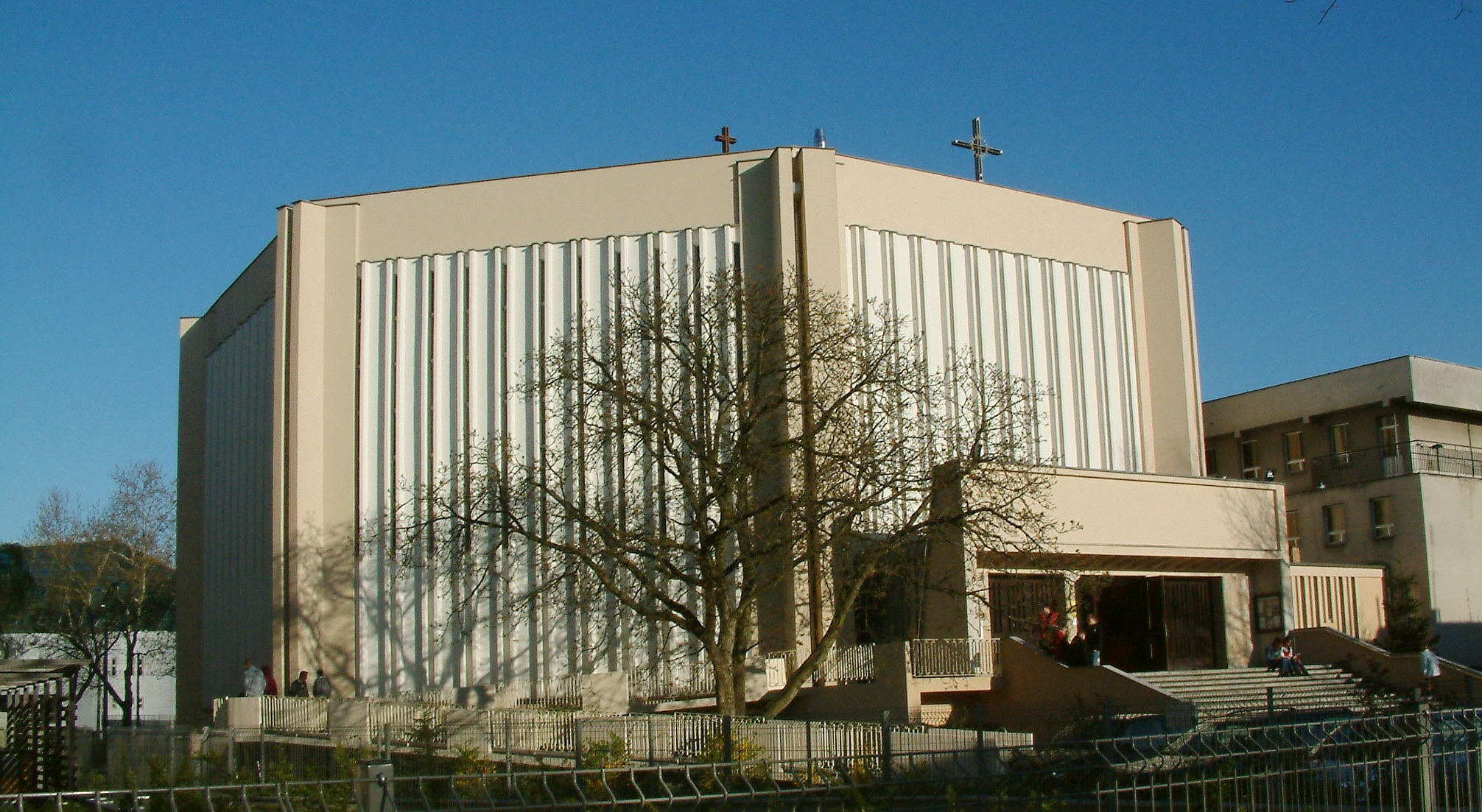
St Wawrzyniec and St Wincent Pallotiti Church

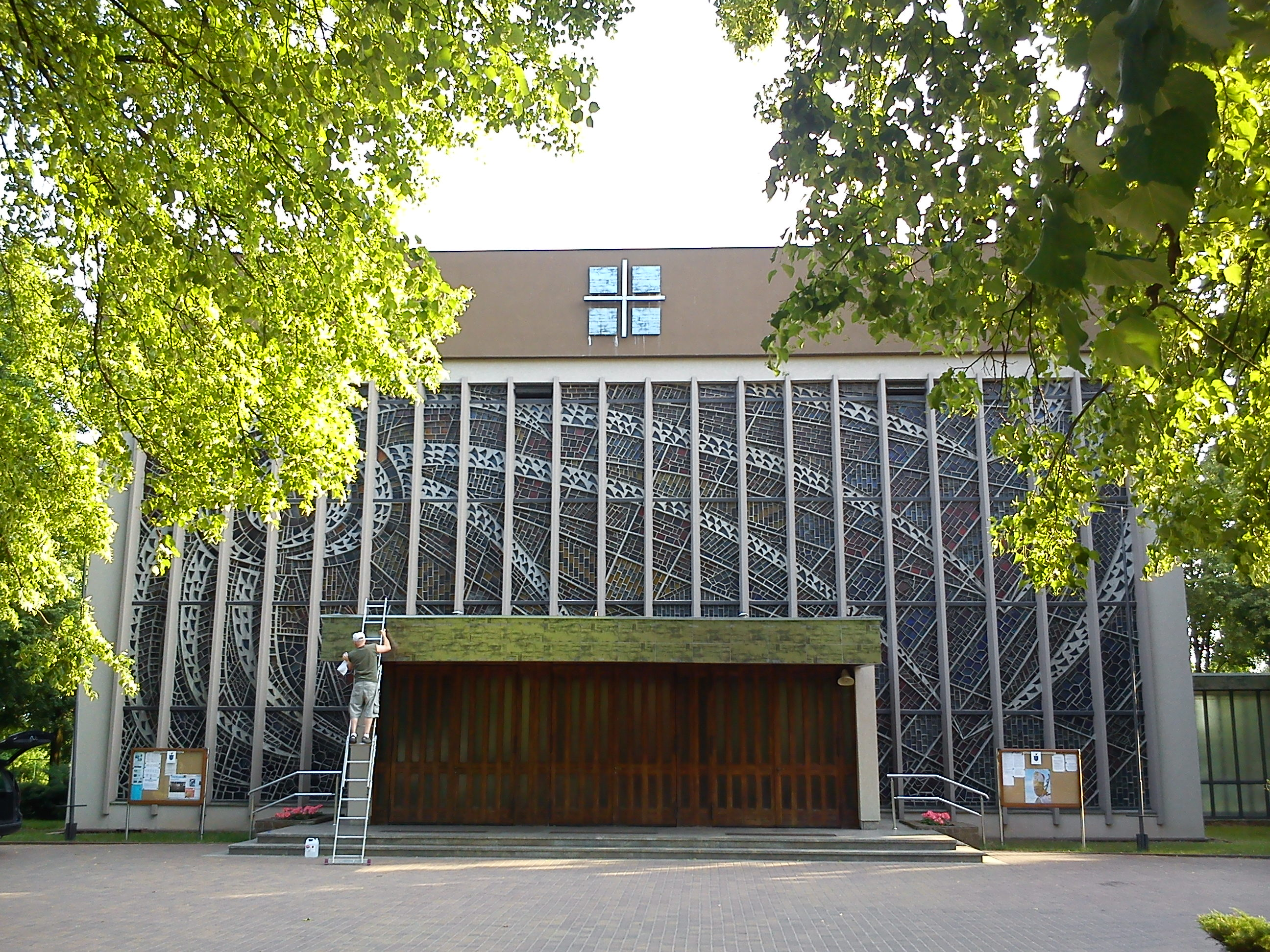
Christ the King Church

== Parks ==
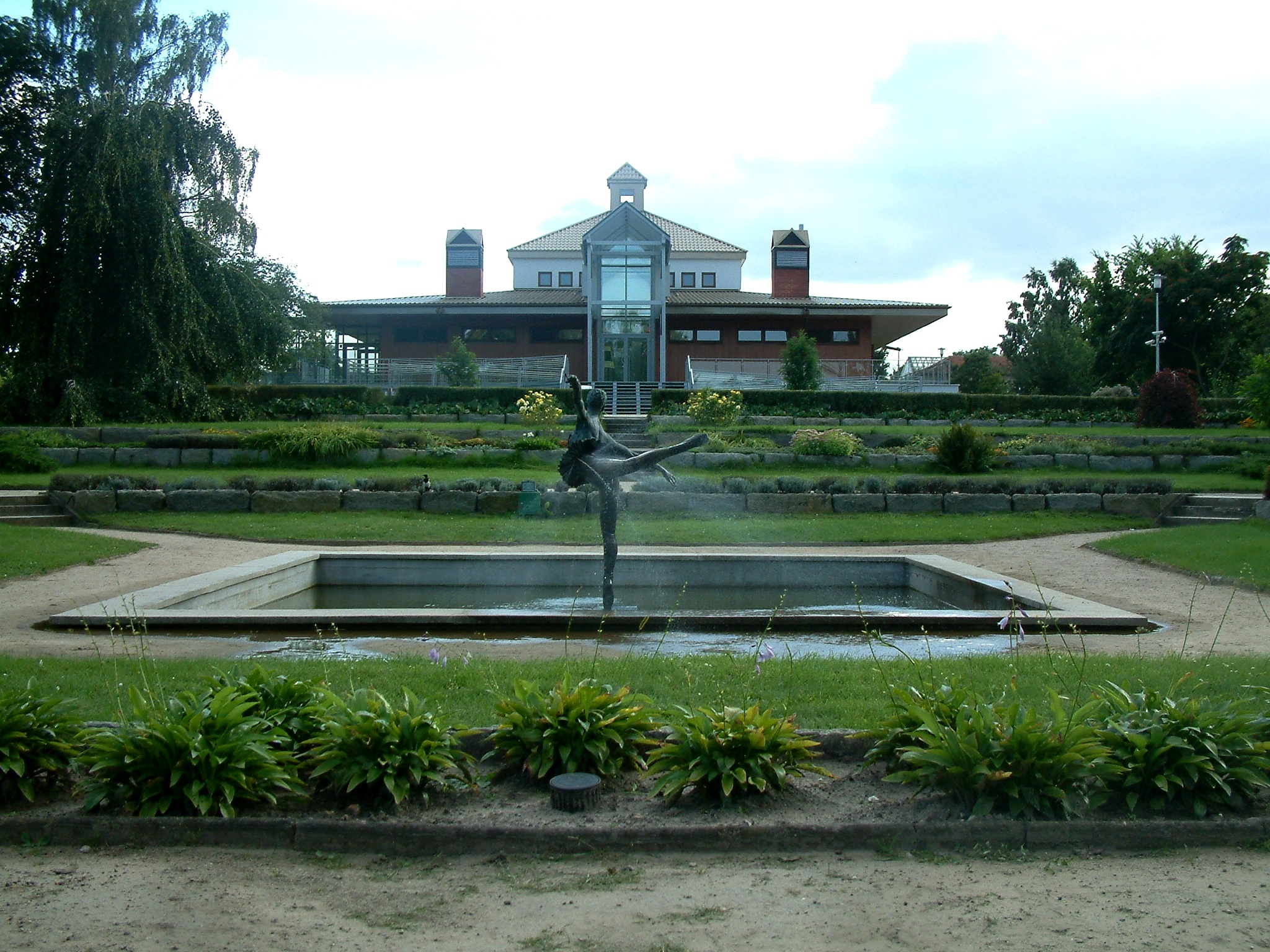
Exhibitions and Education Center at the University's Botanical Garden, opened in 1925

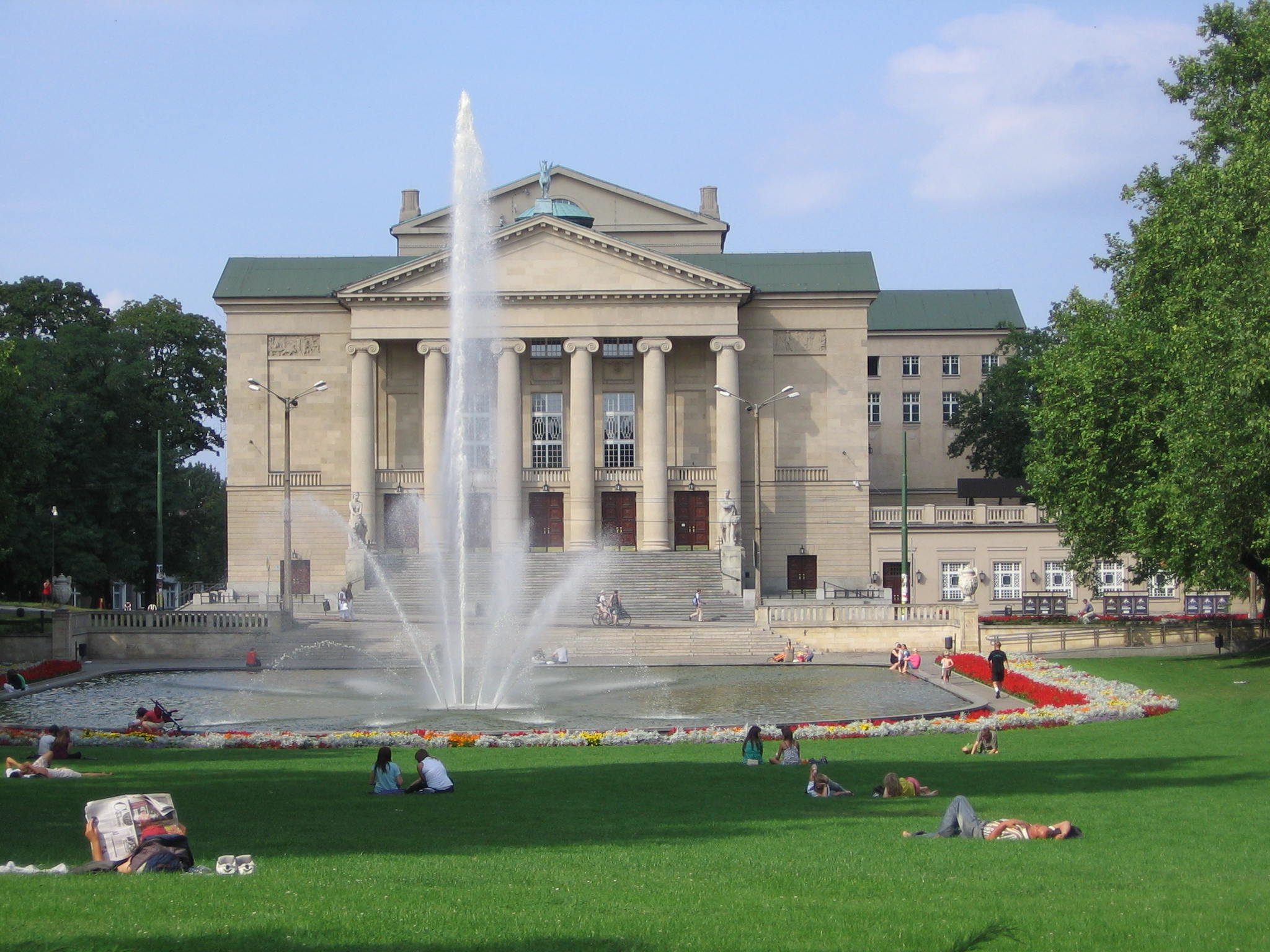
Adama Mickiewicza Park in front of the Grand Theatre

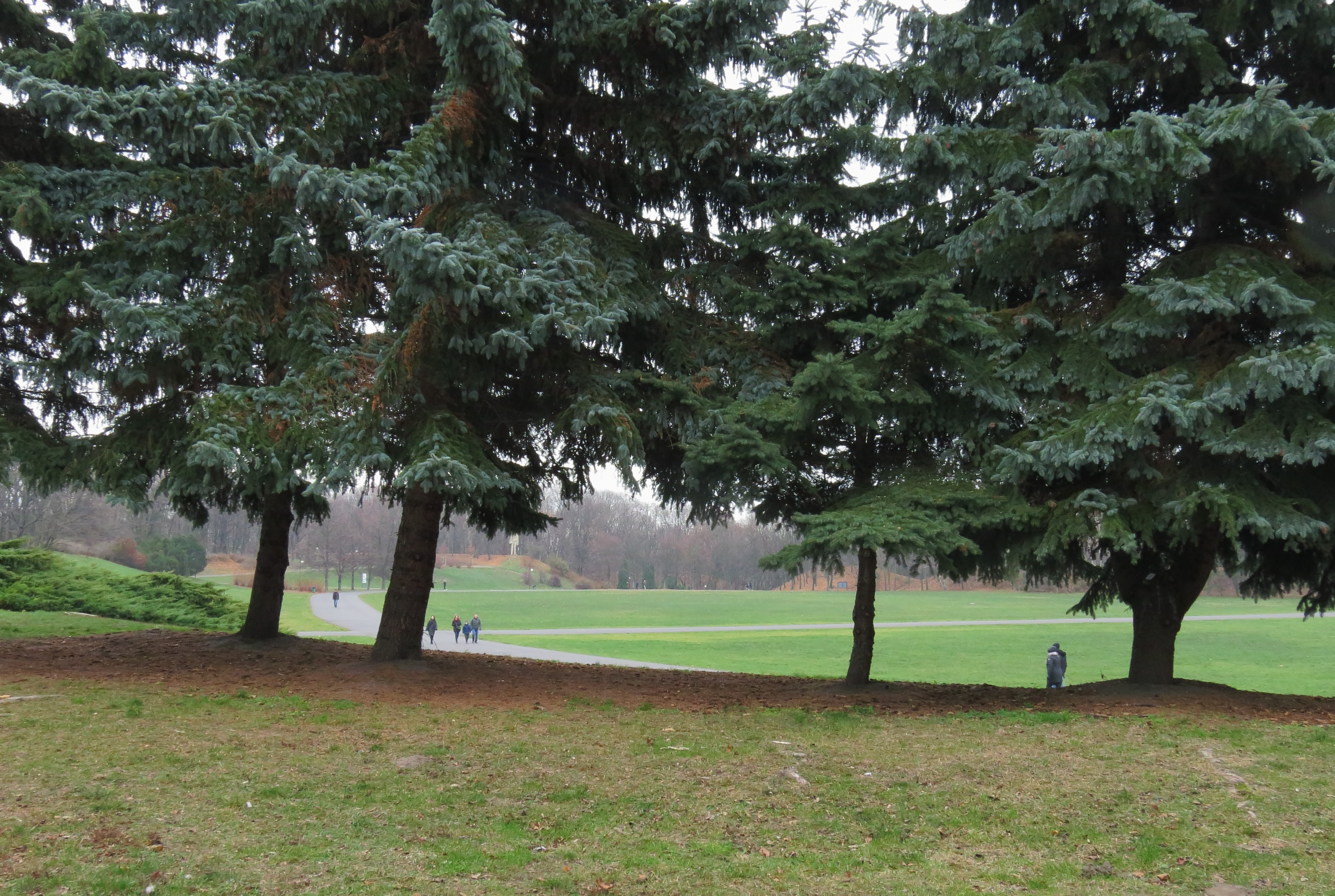
Cytadela Park

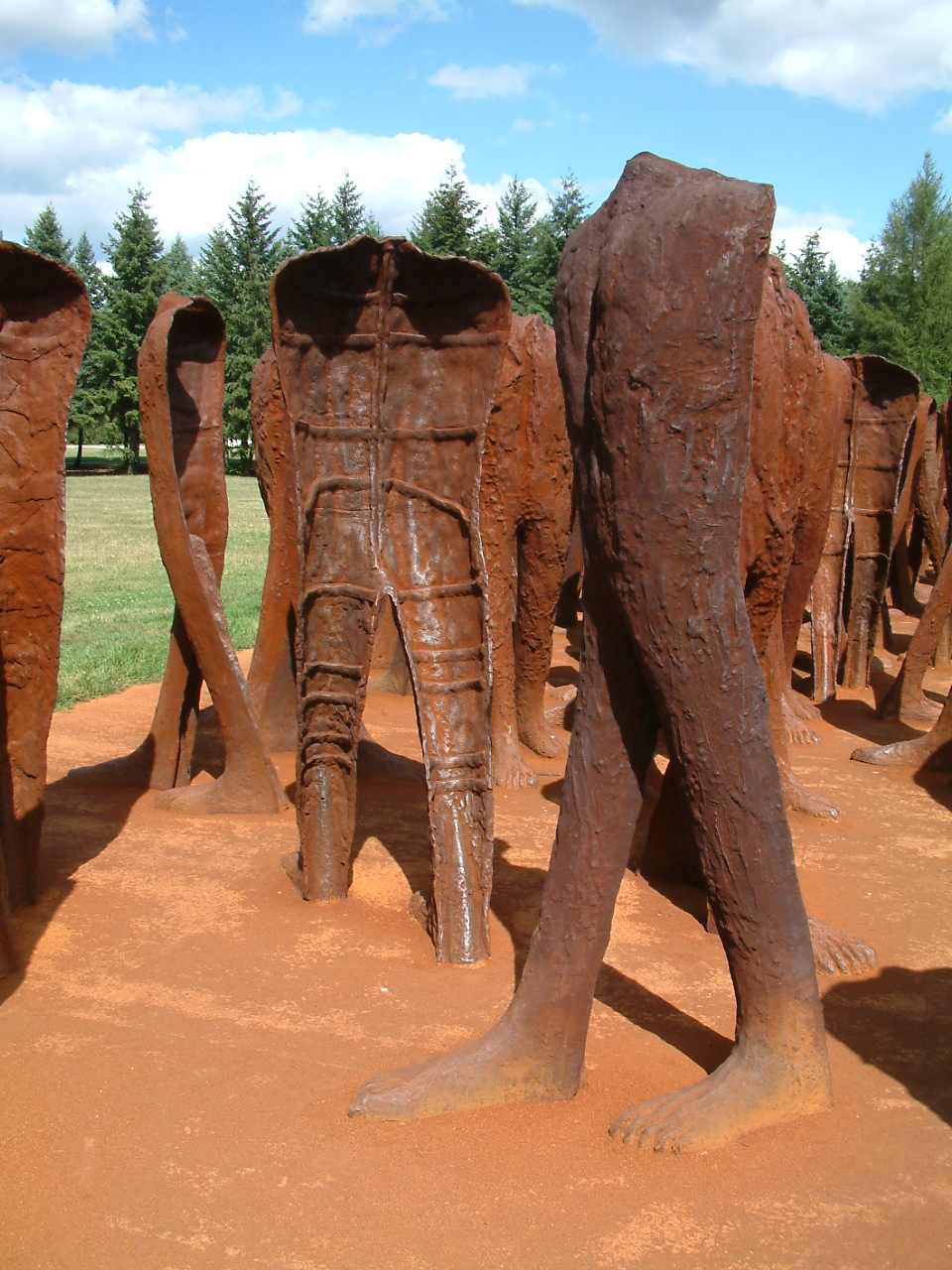
Nierozpoznani (The Unrecognized Ones) by Magdalena Abakanowicz at the Park Cytadela

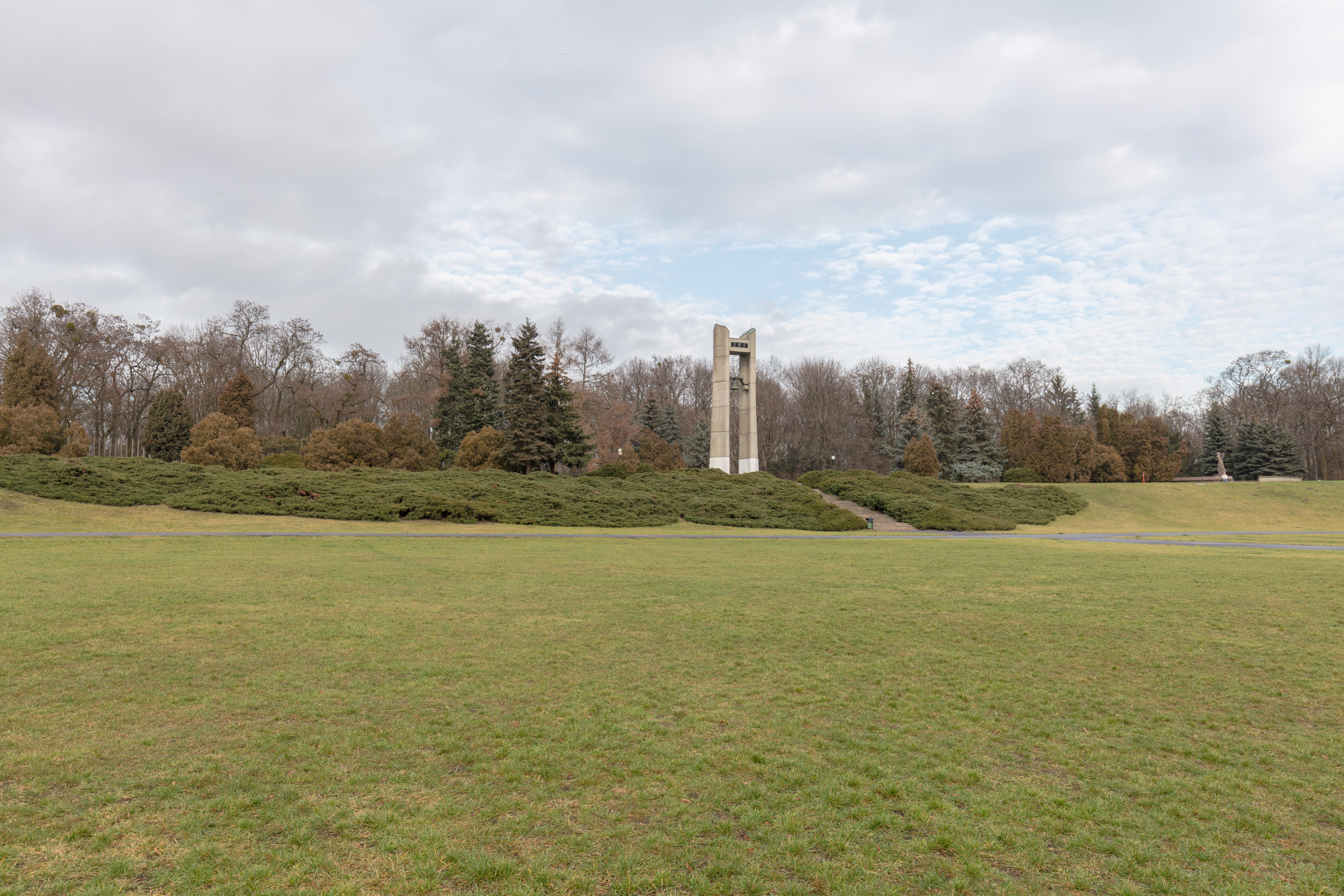
Peace Bell at the Park Cytadela

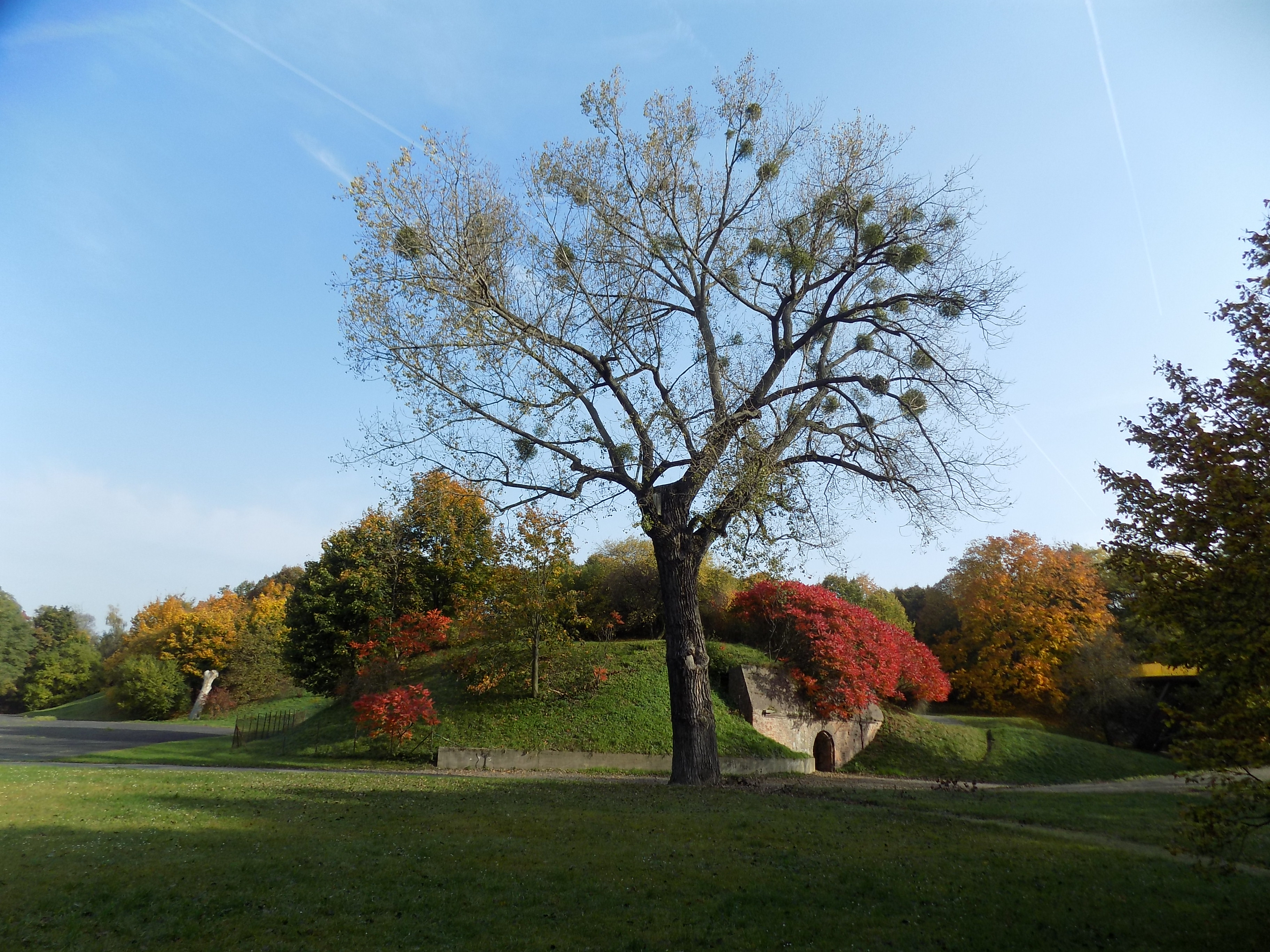
Cytadela Park in autumn

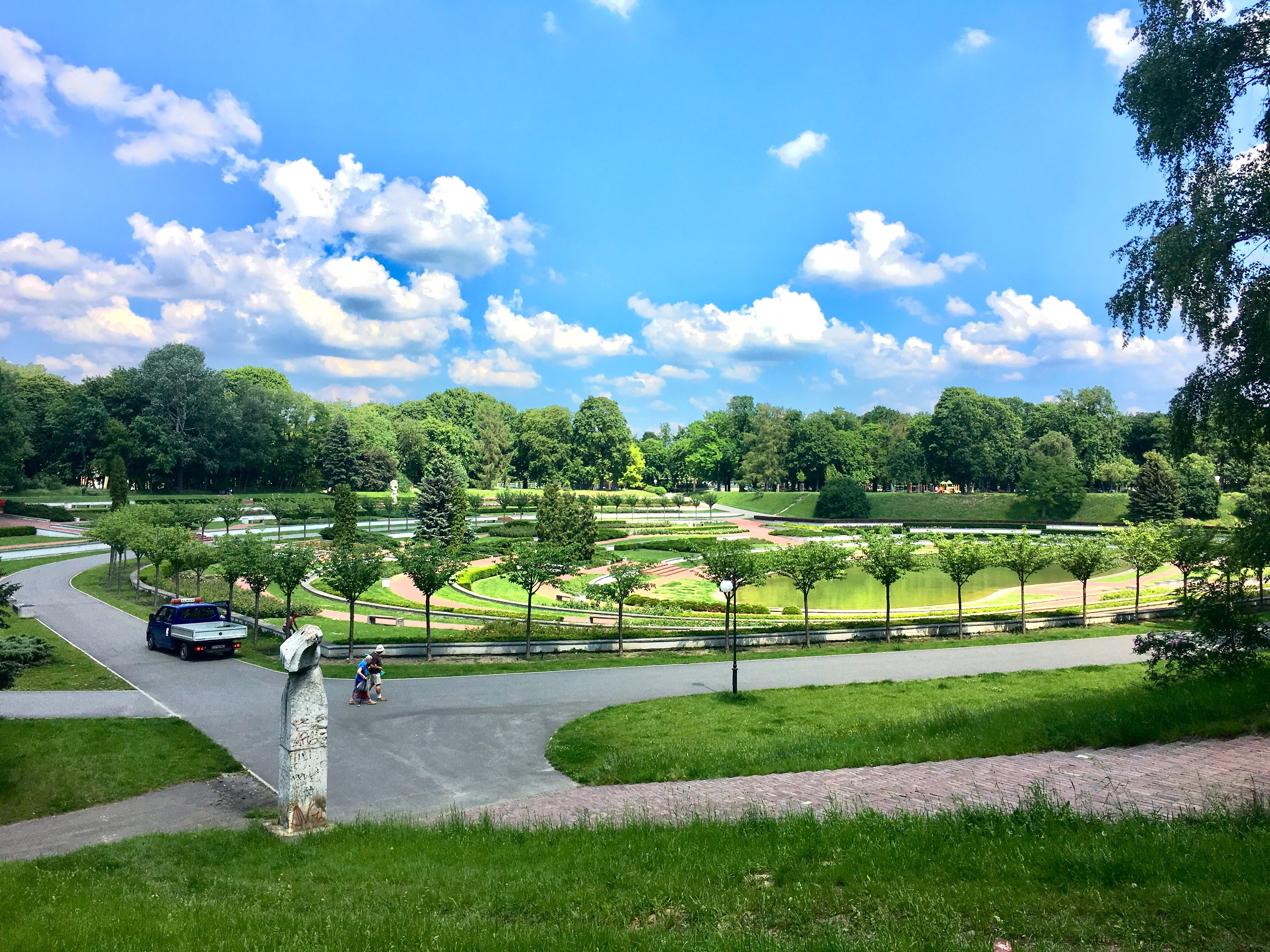
Park Cytadela

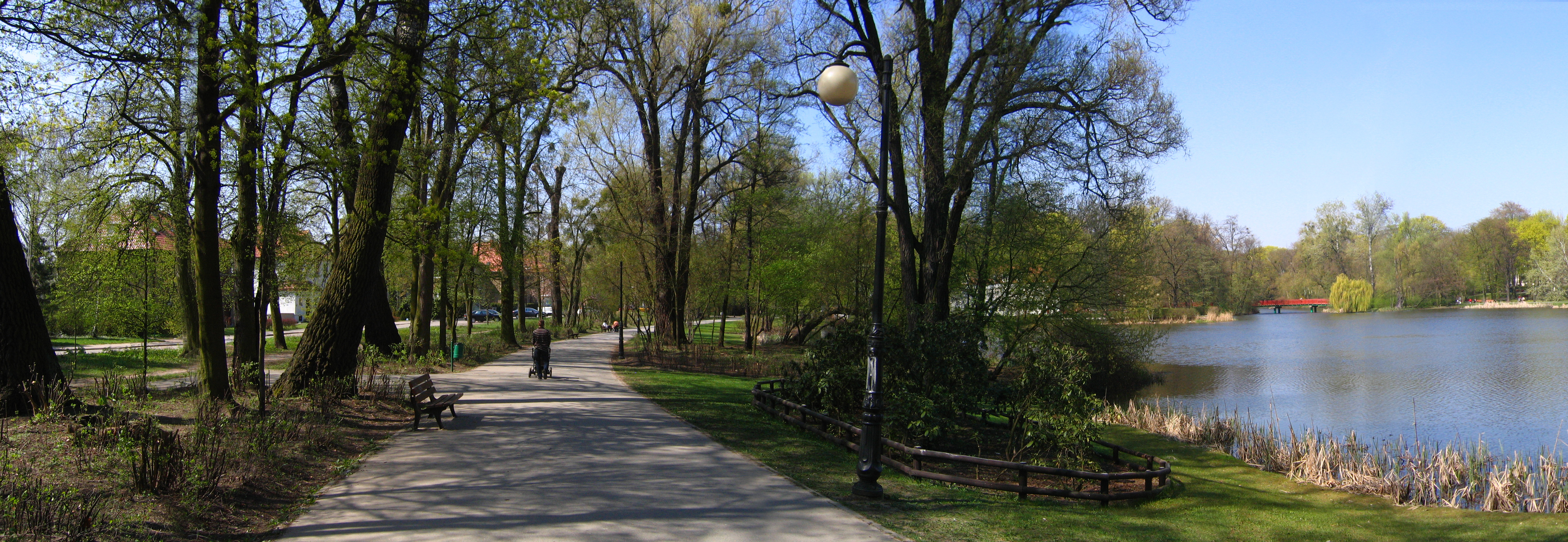
Sołacki Park

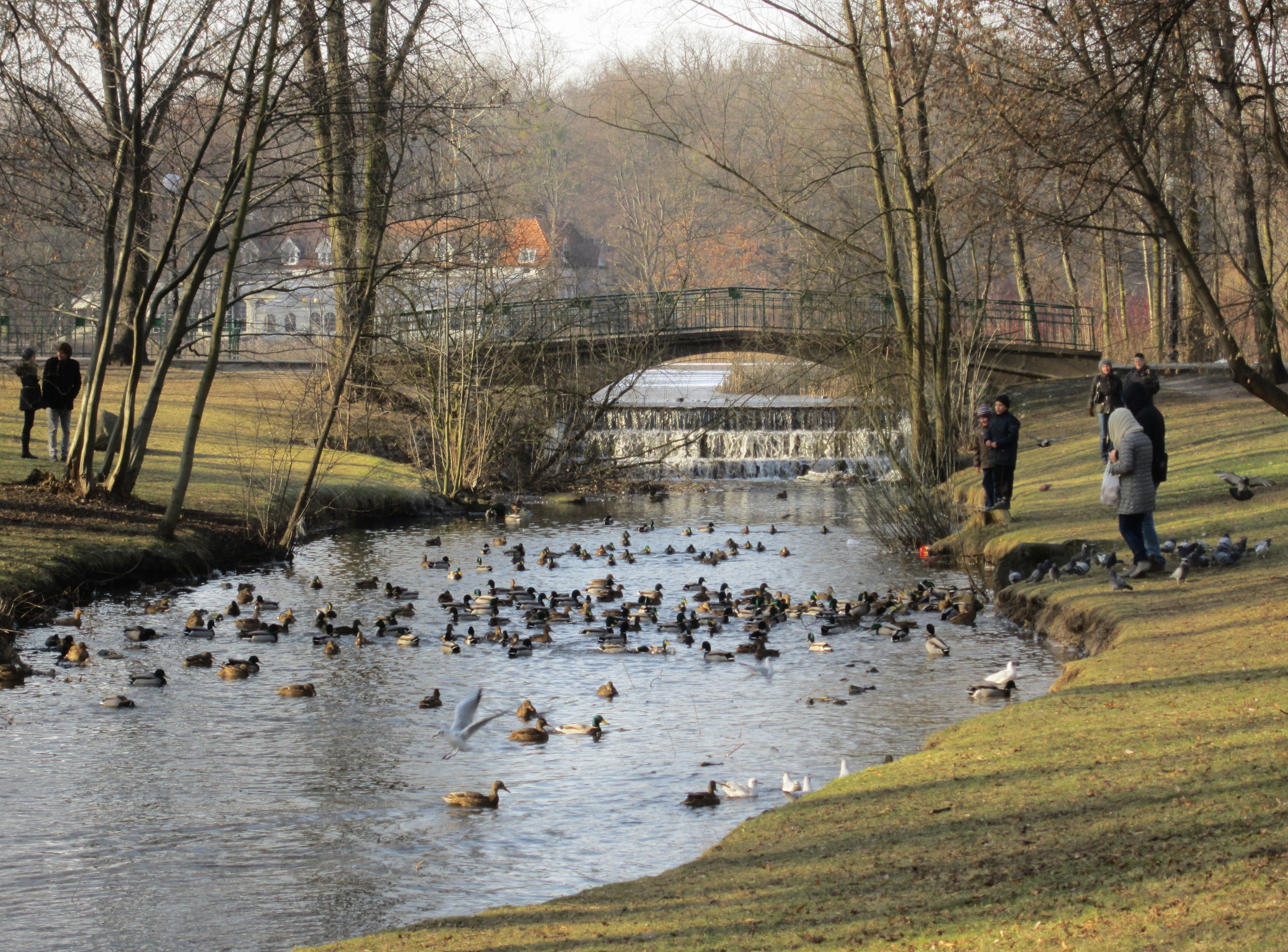
Sołacki Park

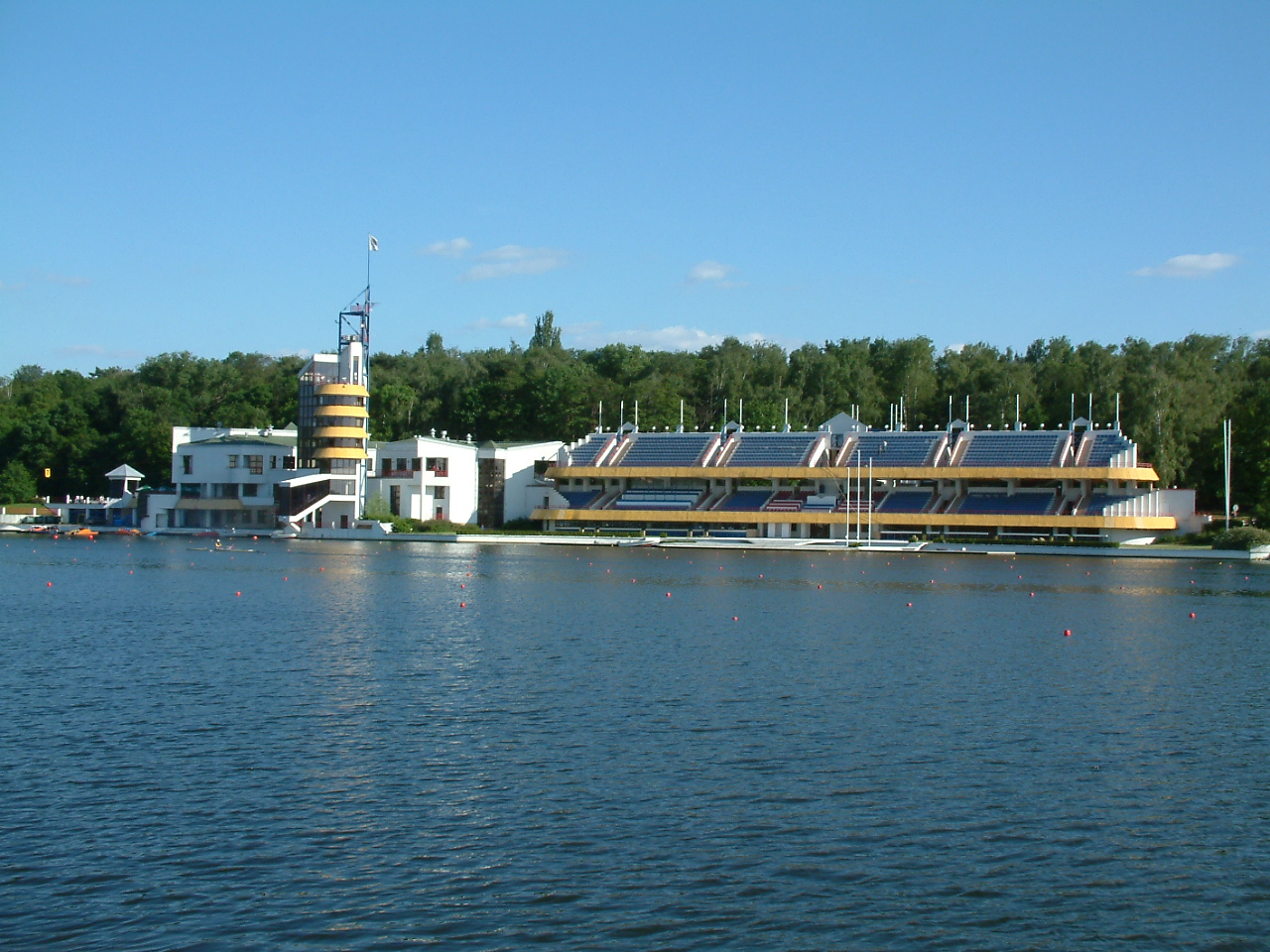
Malta lake, main stands

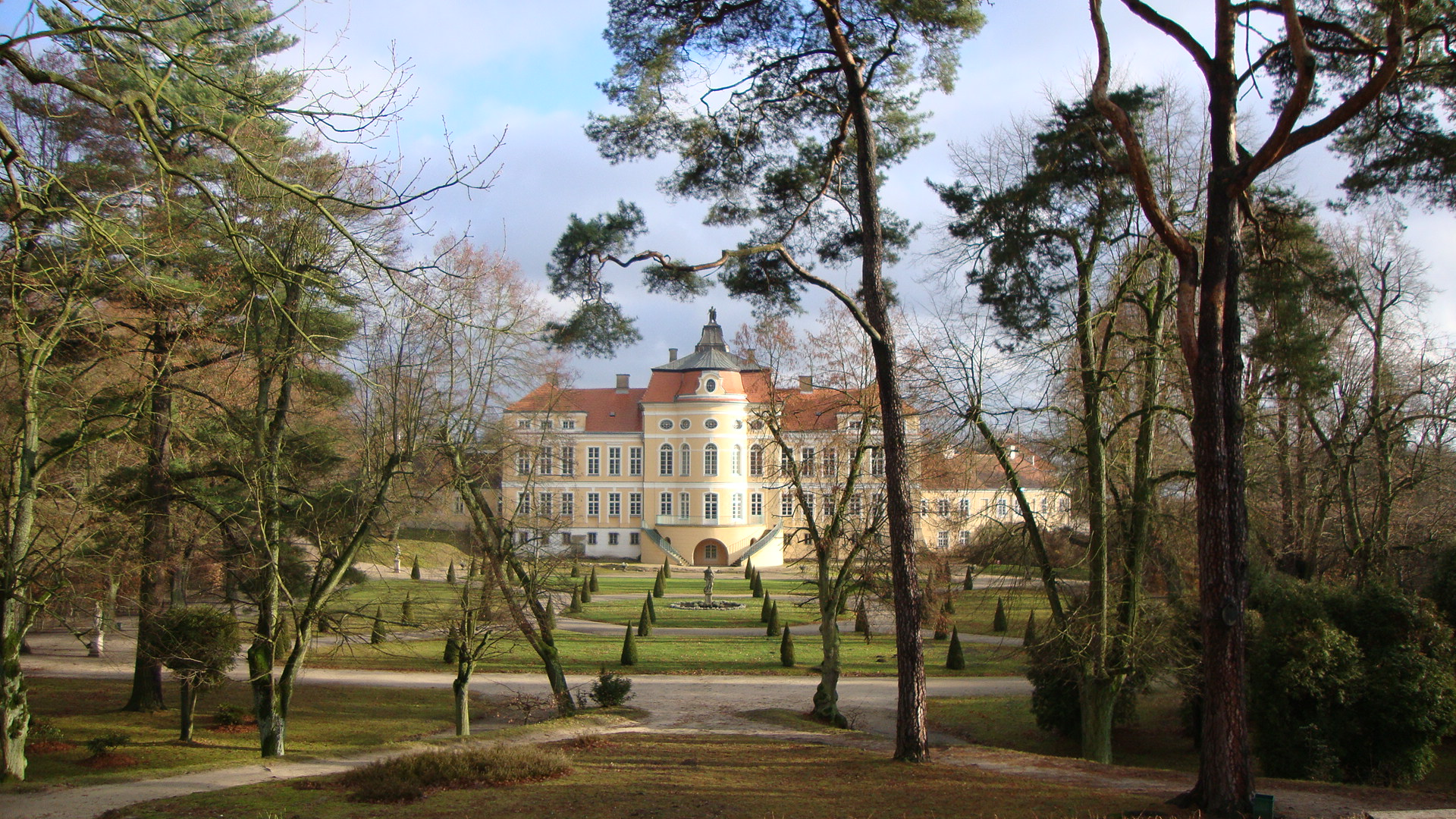
Rogalin's Raczyński Palace within Rogalin Landscape Park

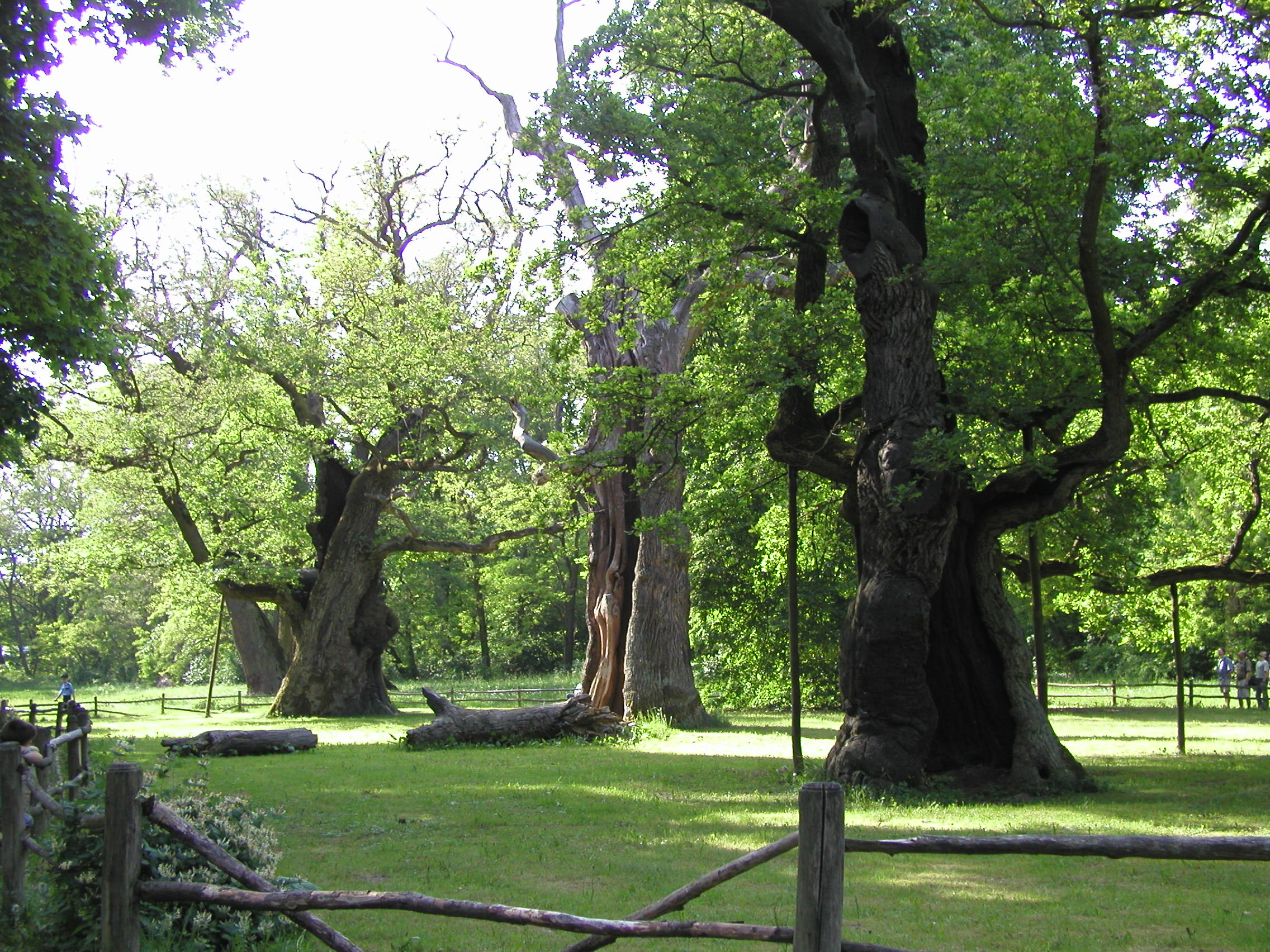
Ancient oaks in Rogalin

== Monuments ==
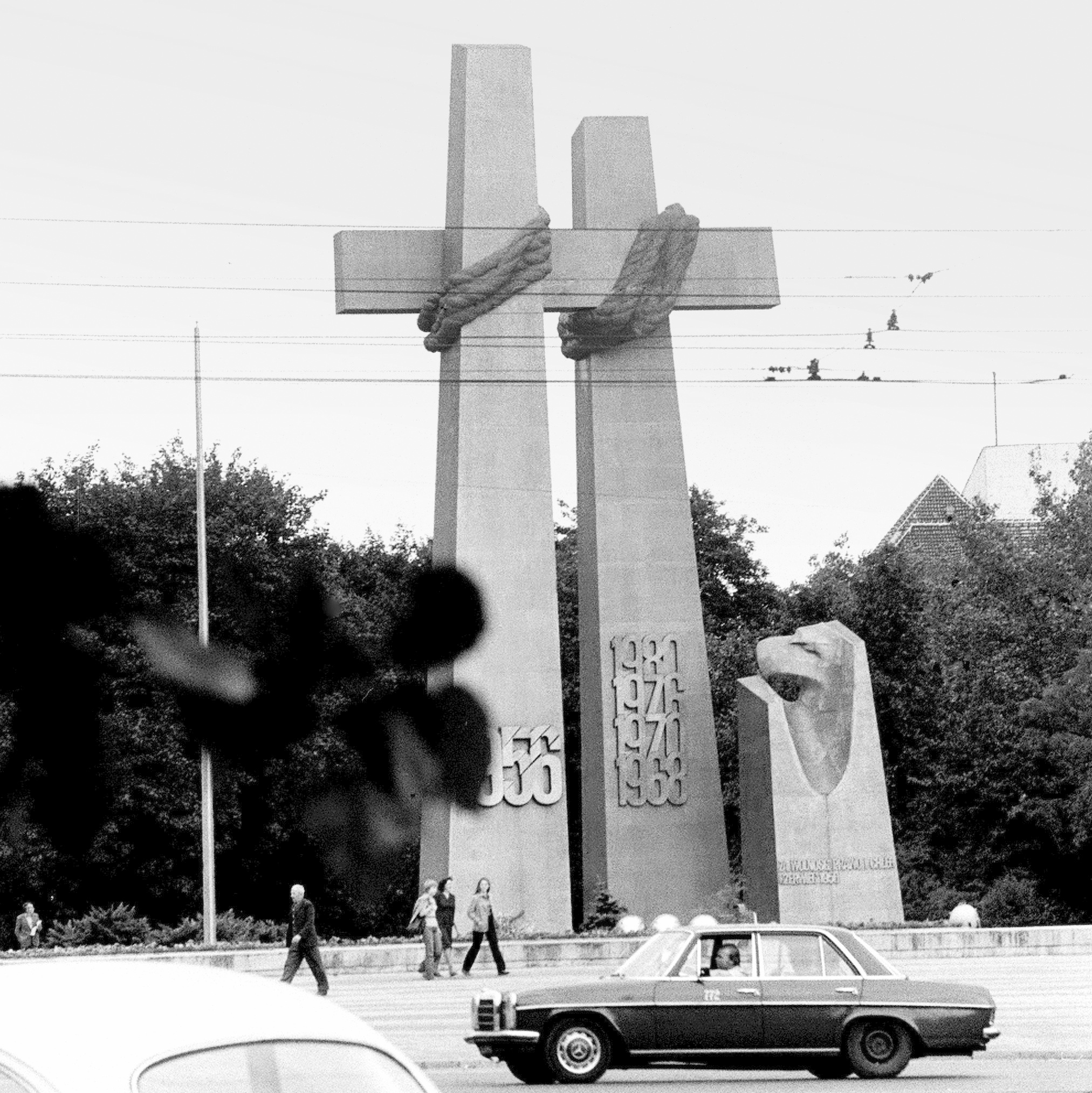
Poznań Crosses – Monument to the Victims of June 1956 (1981)

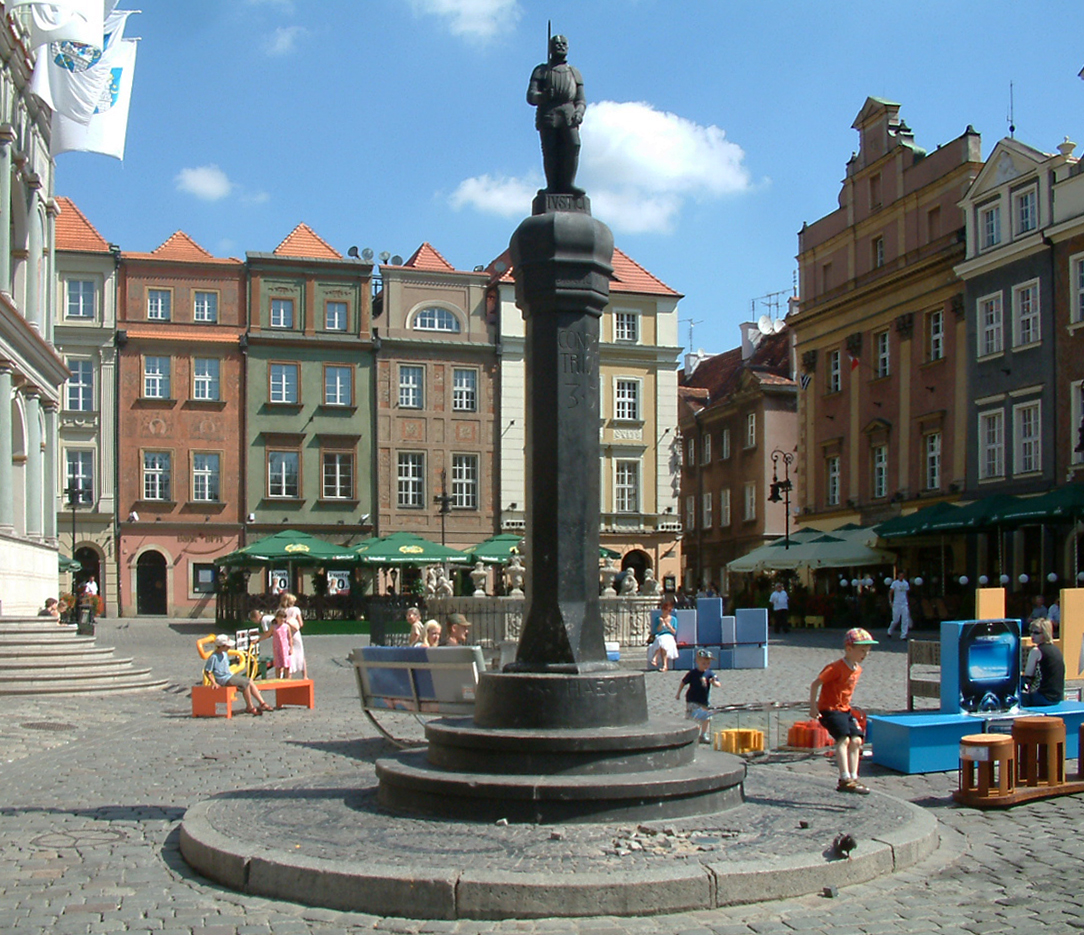
Old Market Square, the Pranger whipping post

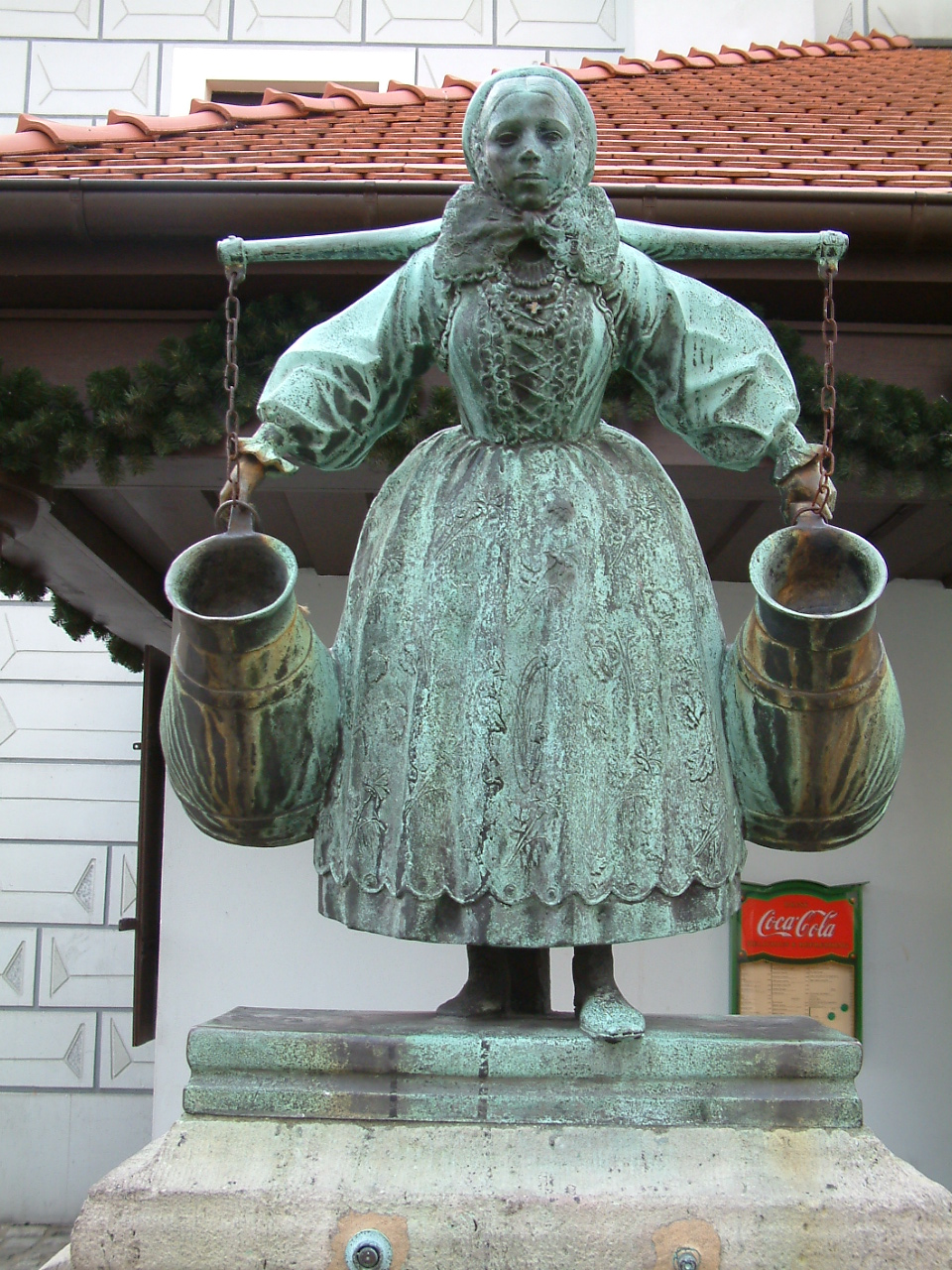
Bamberka fountain

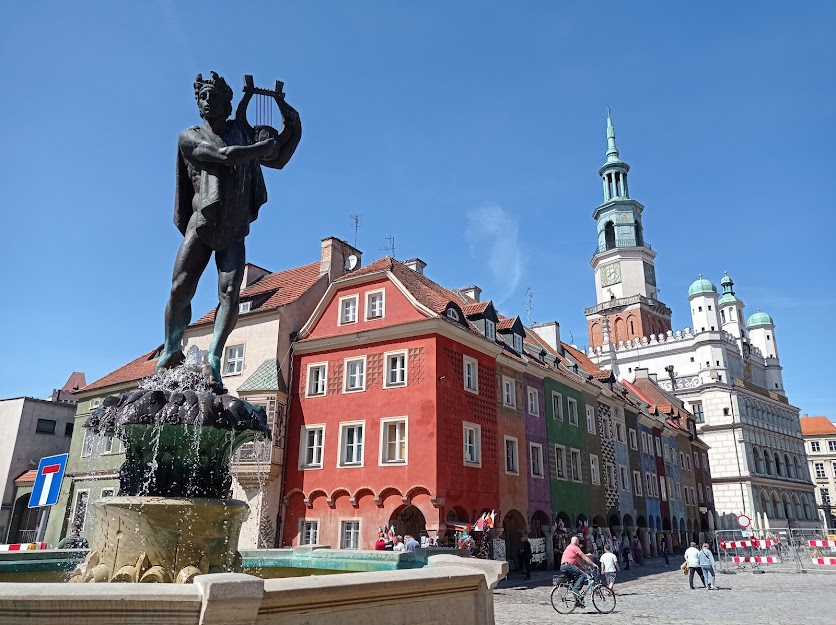
Apollo fountain

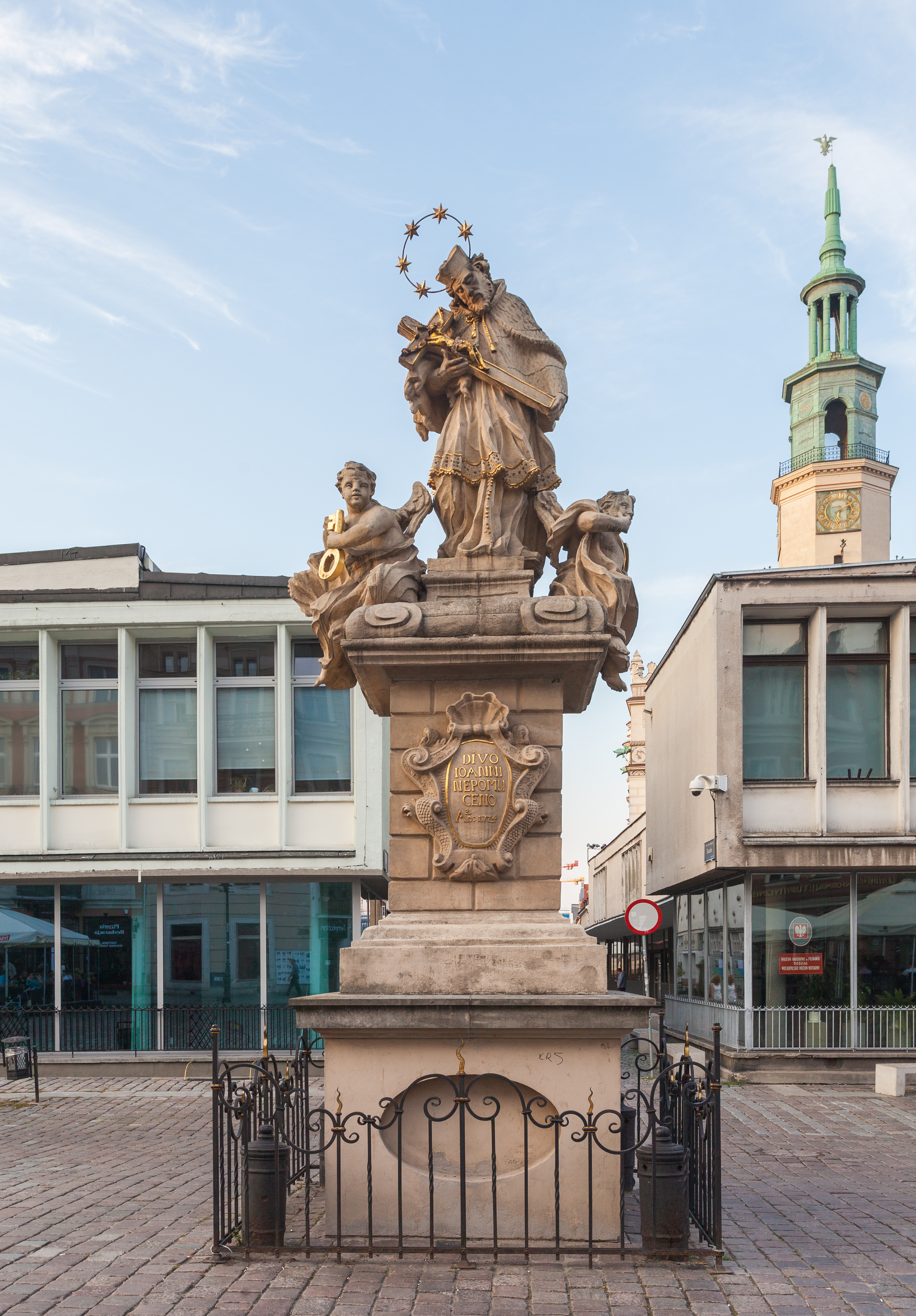
Statue of St. John Nepomucene

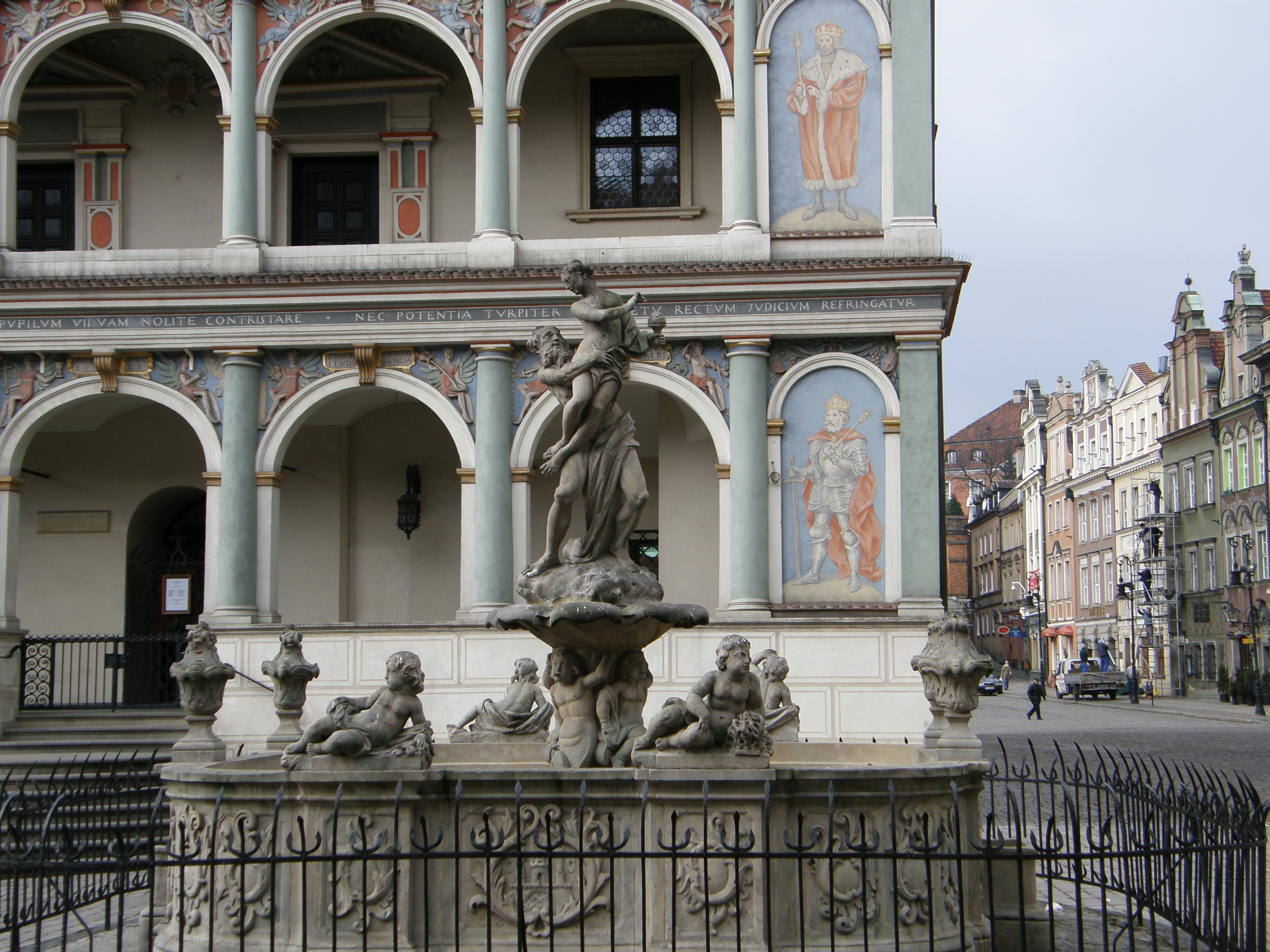
Proserpine fountain

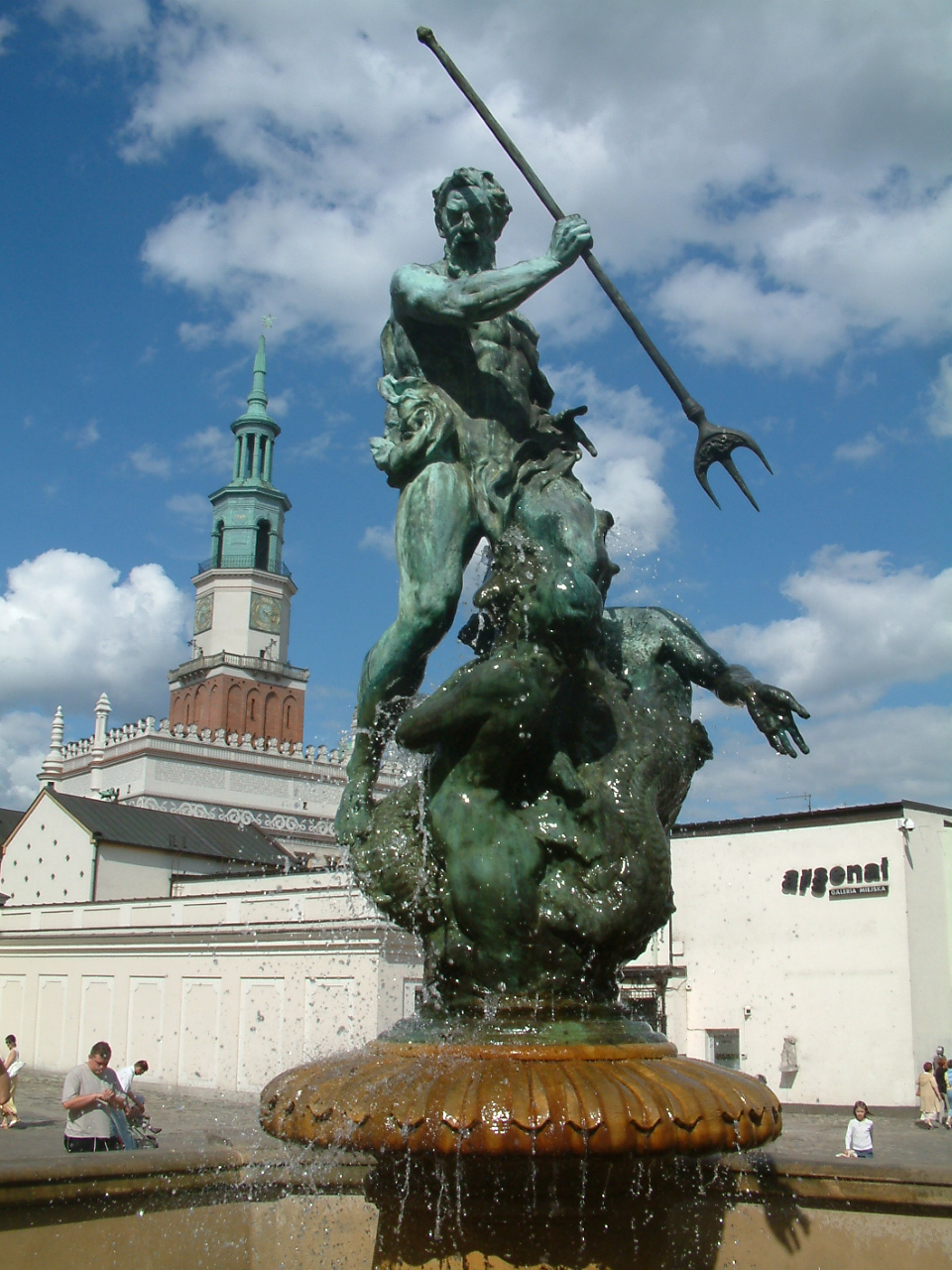
Fountain of Neptune

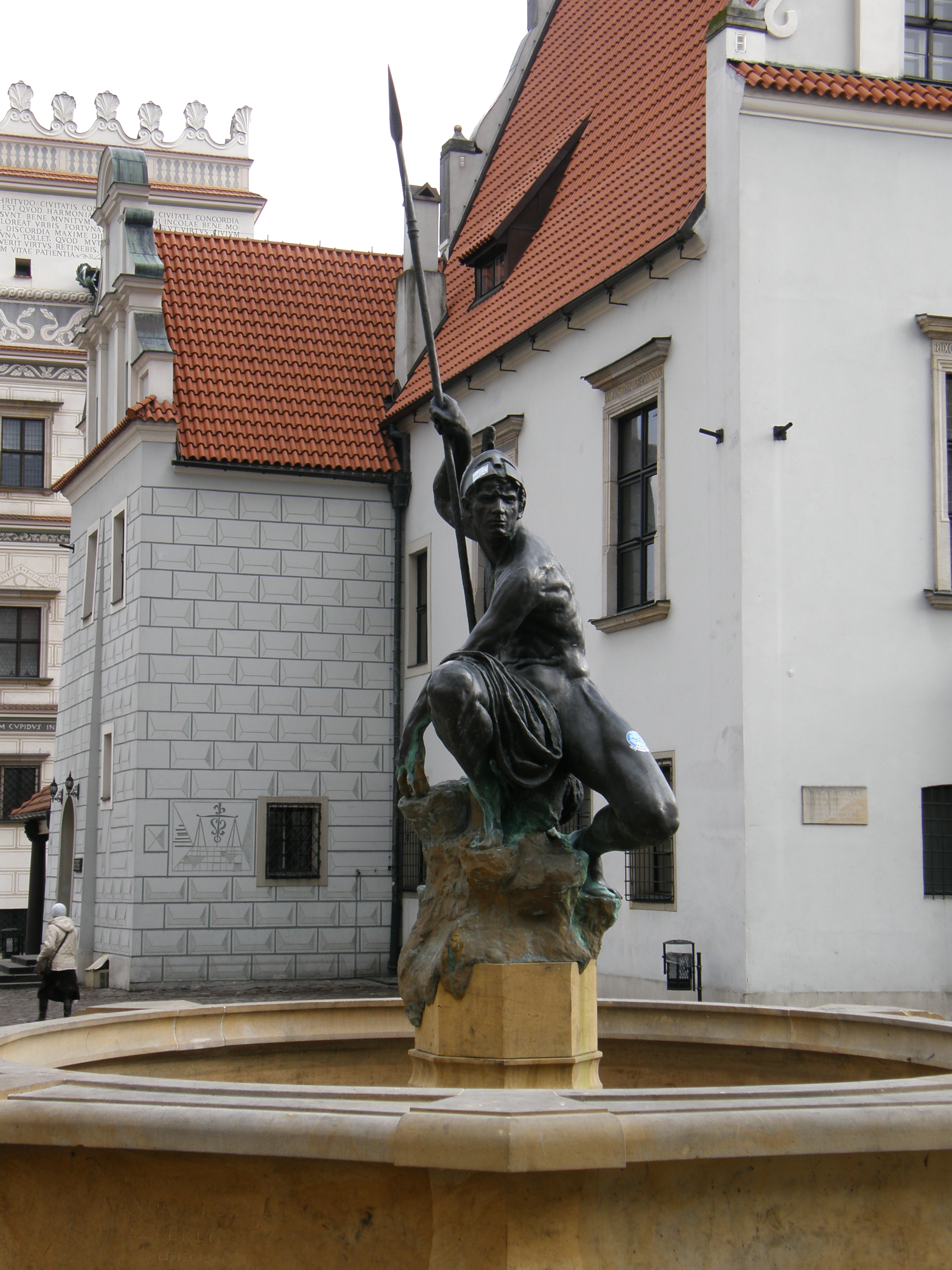
Fountain of Mars

== Notable buildings ==
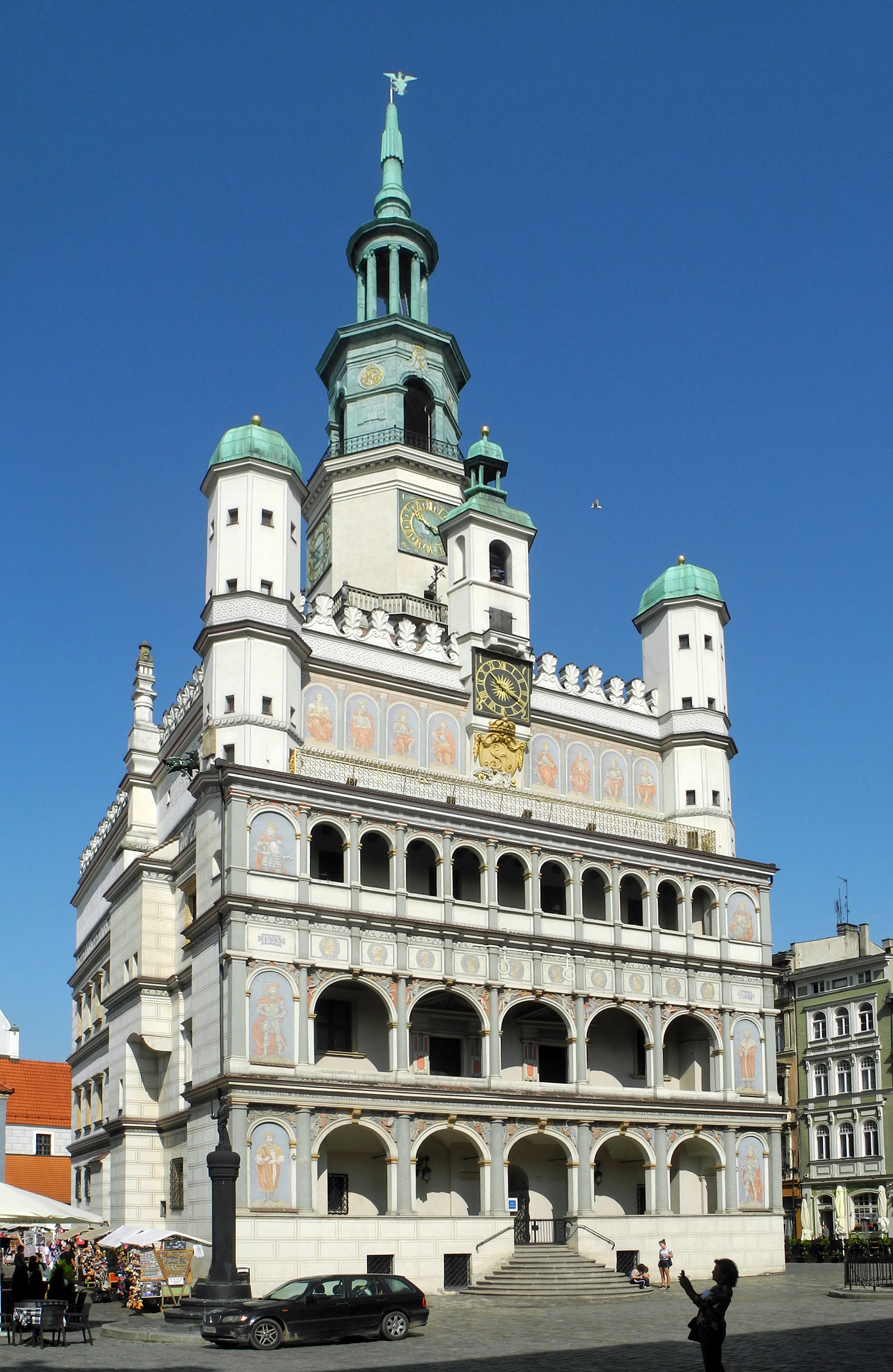
Poznań Town Hall

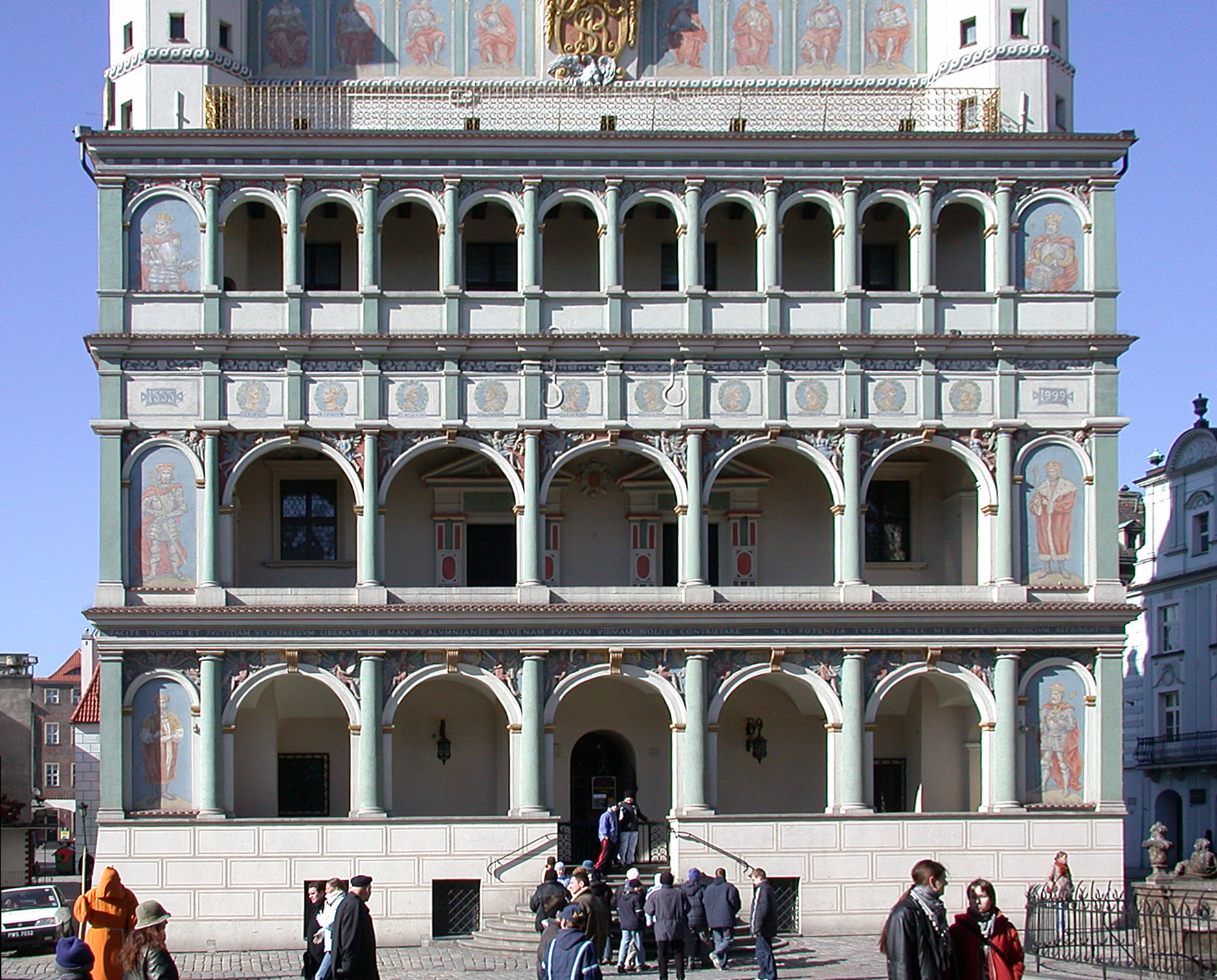
Loggia of Town Hall

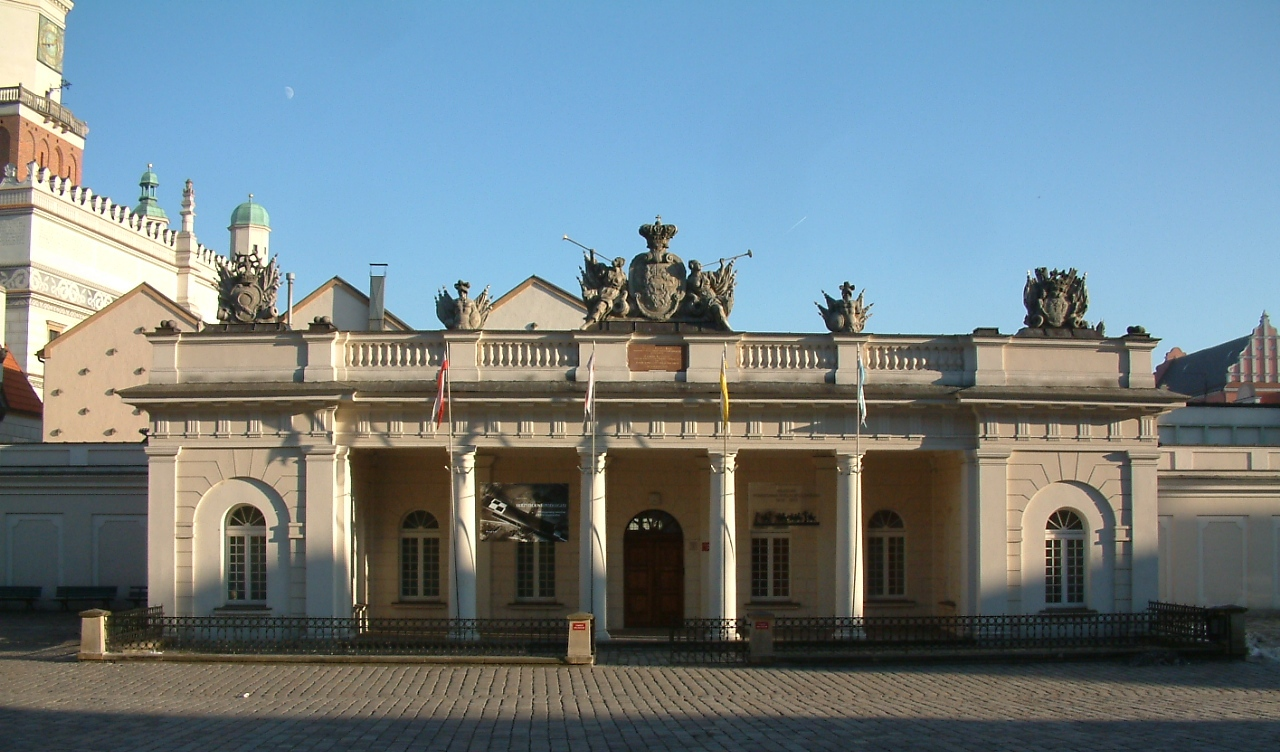
The Odwach guardhouse built in 1783–1787

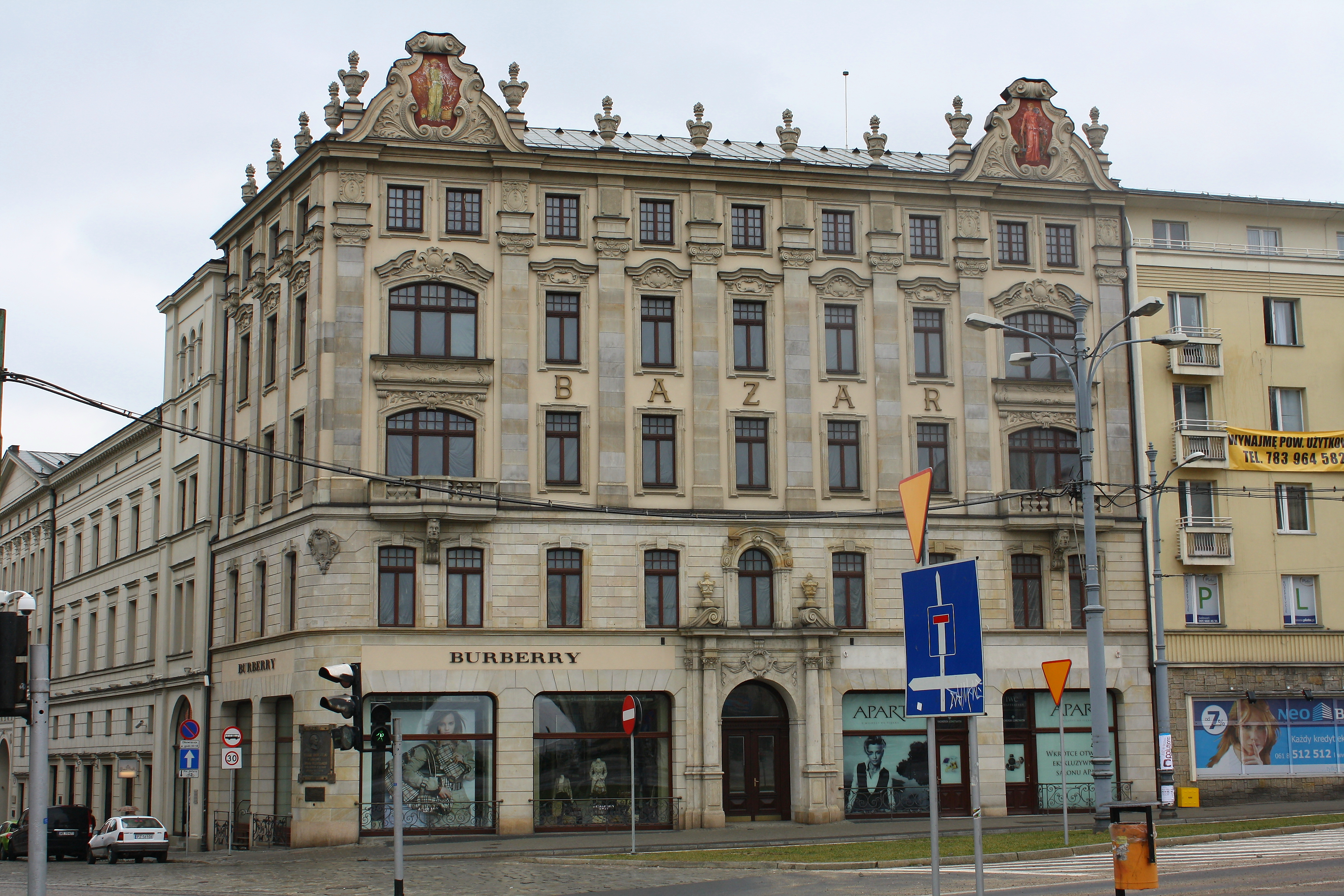
Bazar Hotel

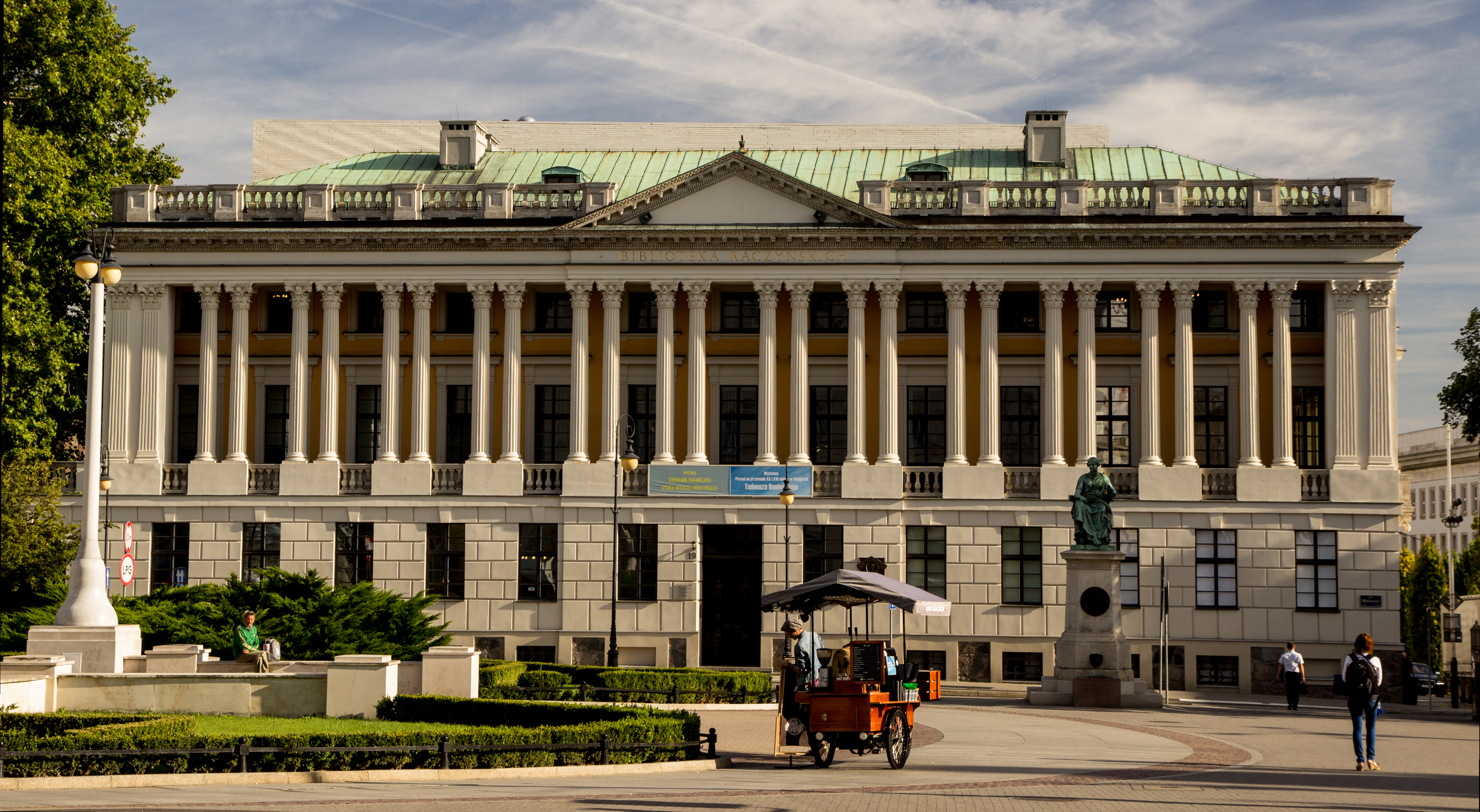
Raczyński Library

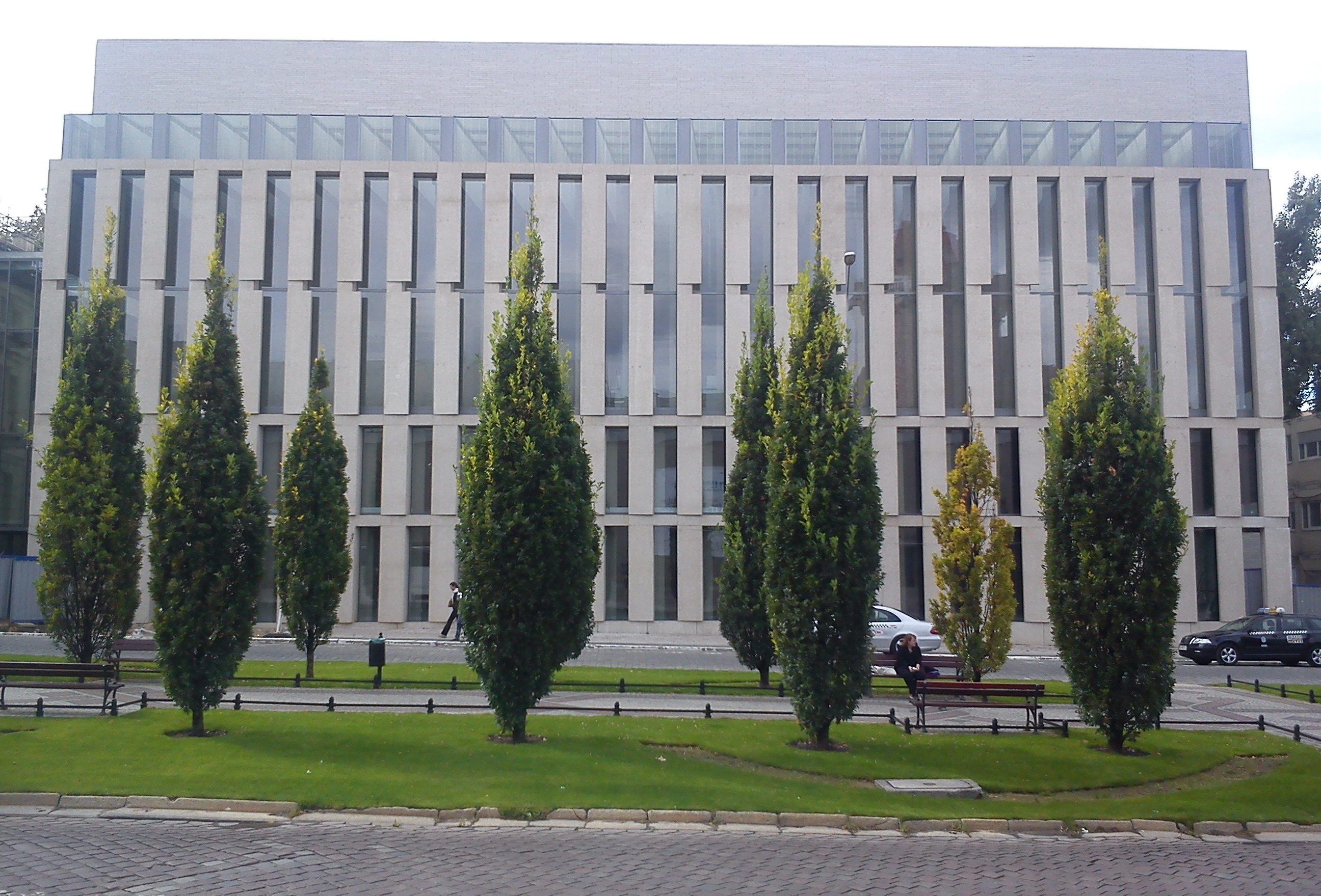
New win of the Raczyński Library

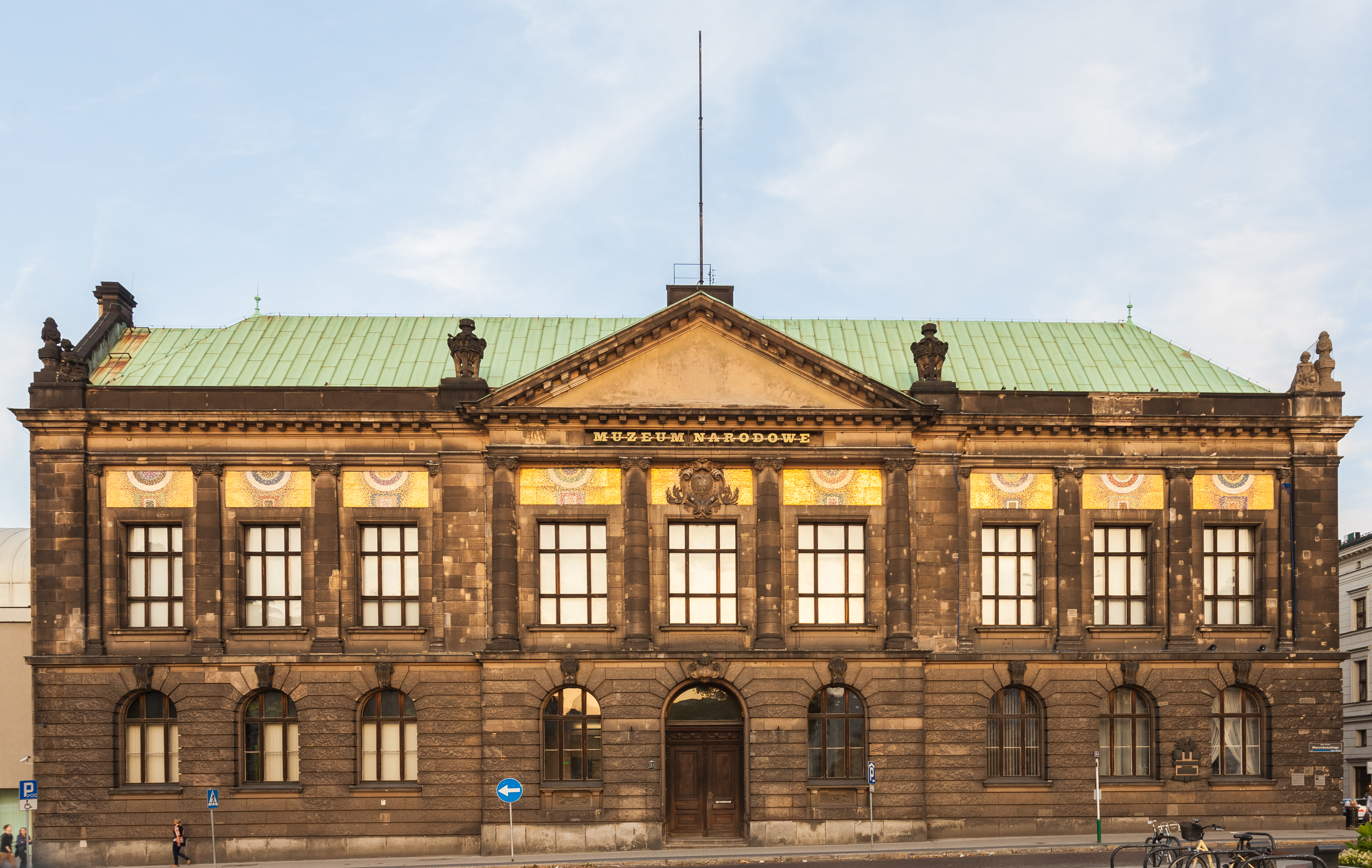
National Museum in Poznań

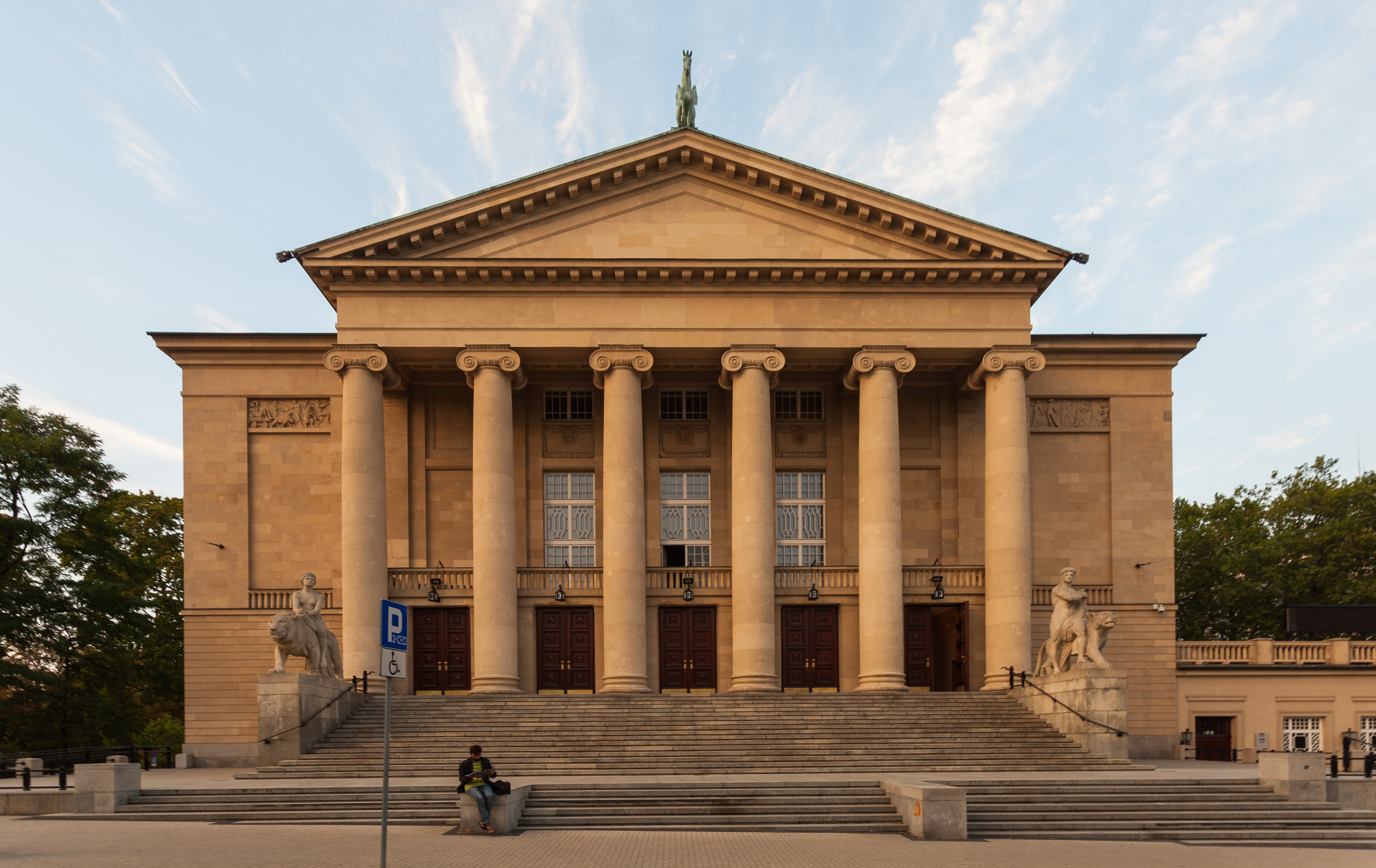
Grand Theatre

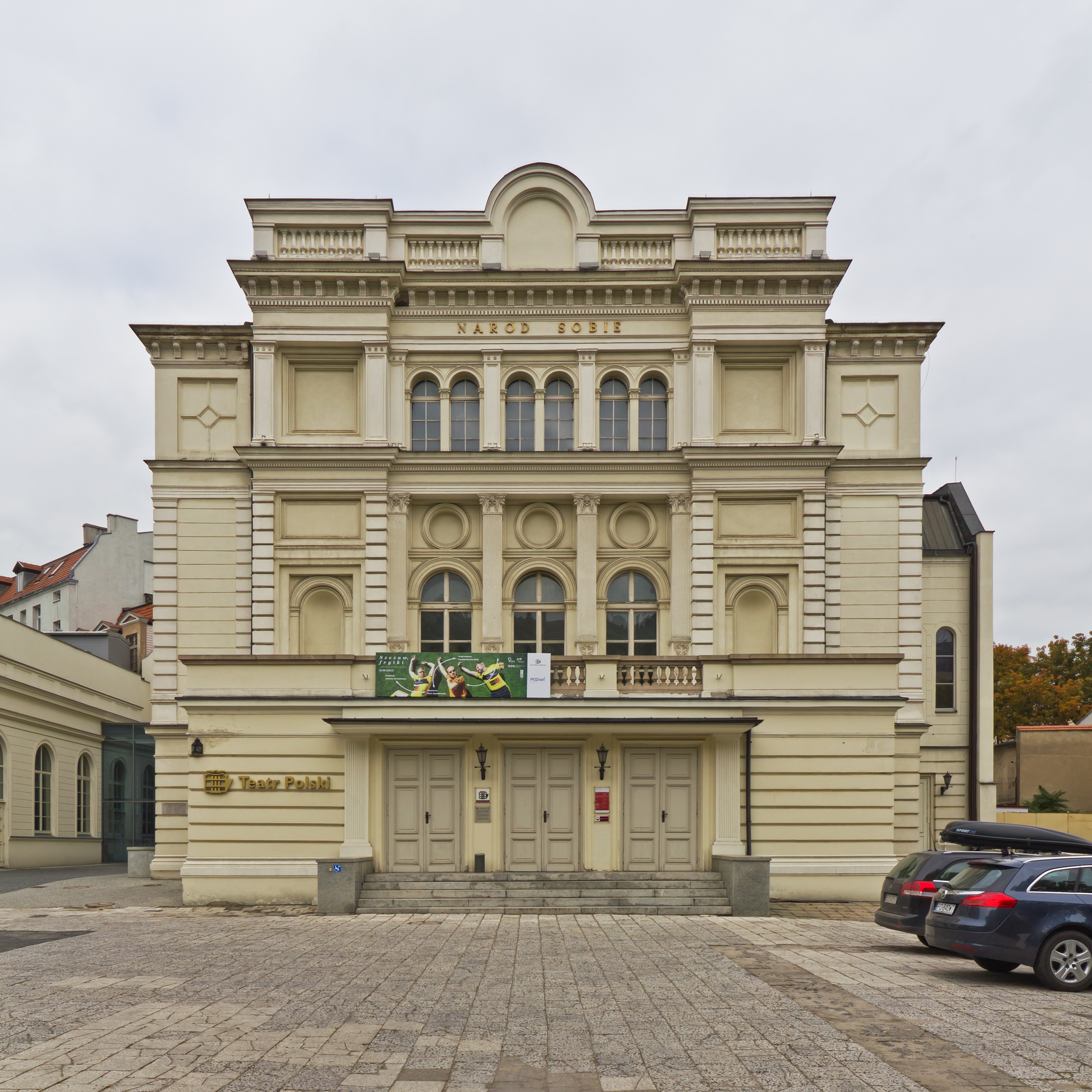
Polish Theatre

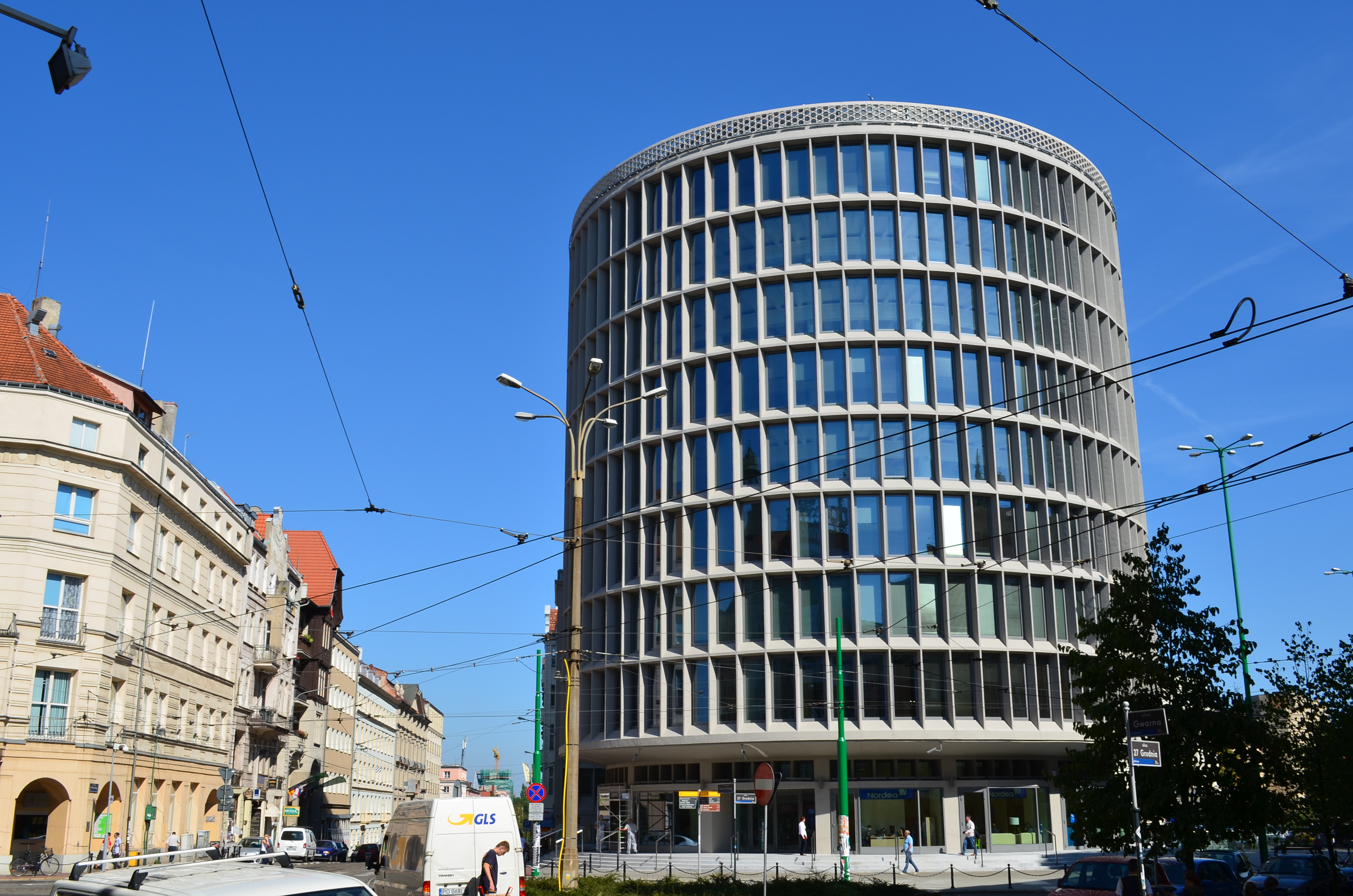
Okrąglak office center

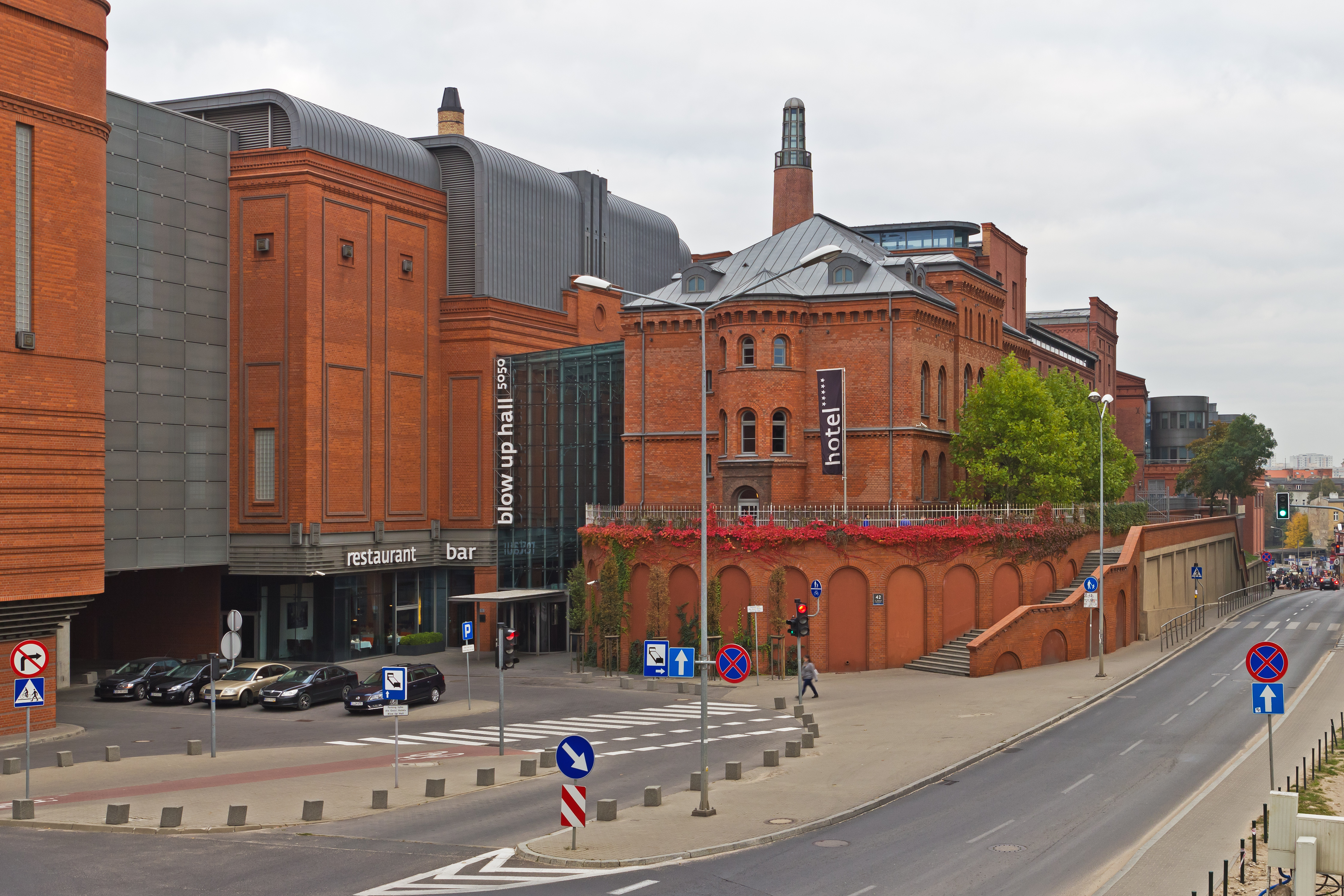
Stary Browar, view from the south

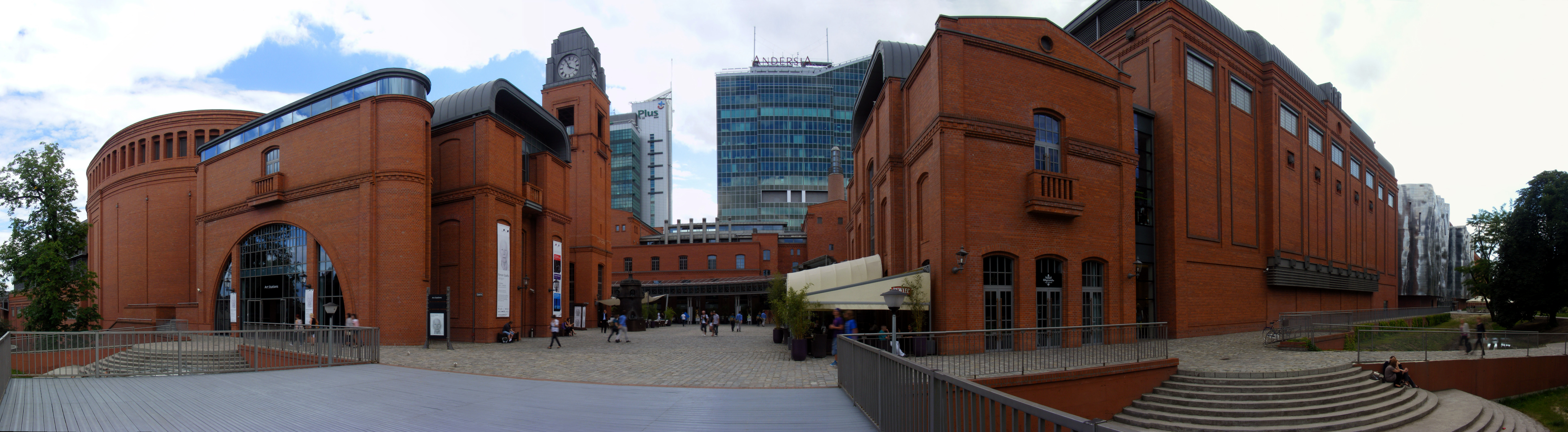
Stary Browar, as seen from the north

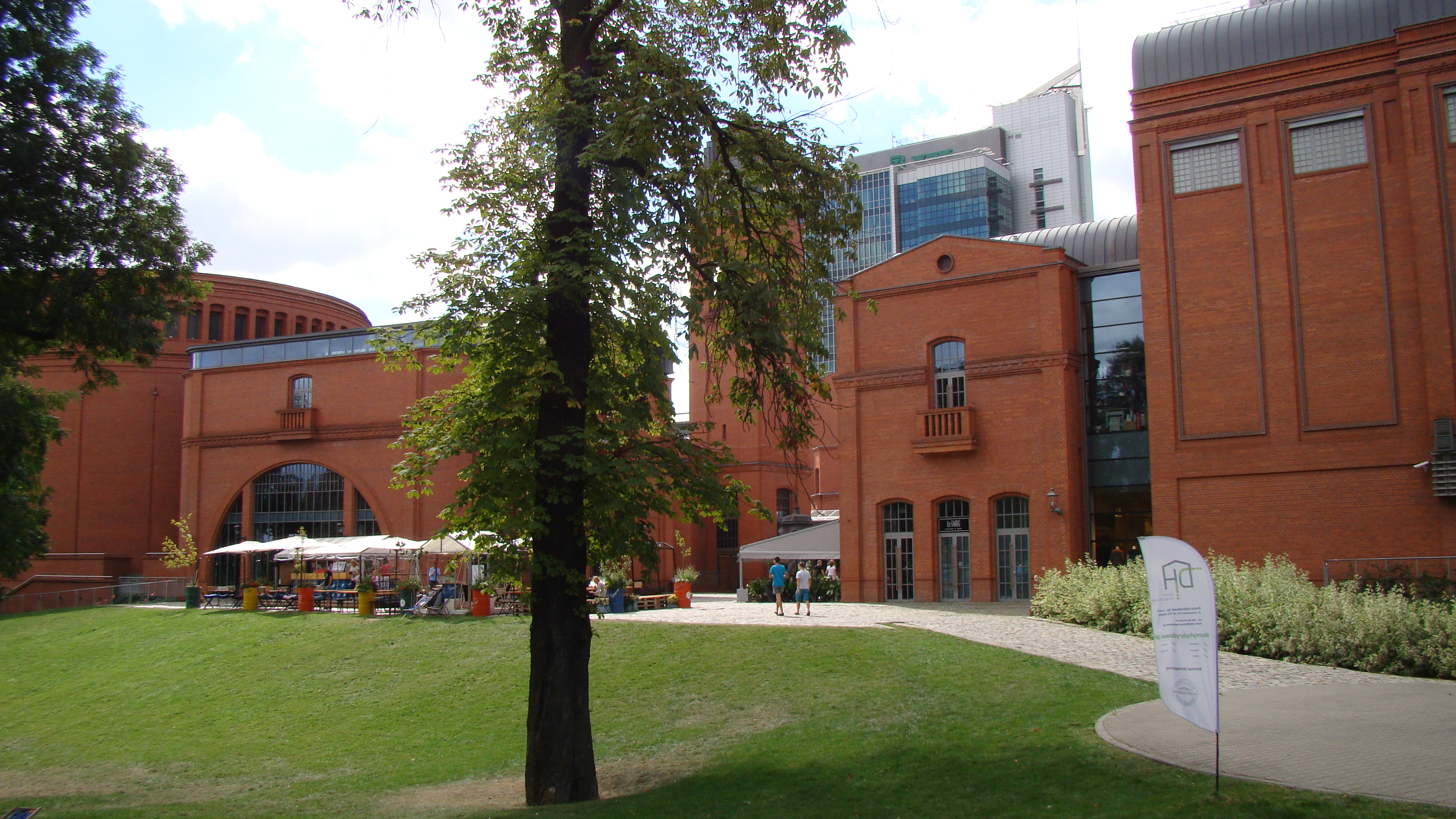
Stary Browar, place of summer activities

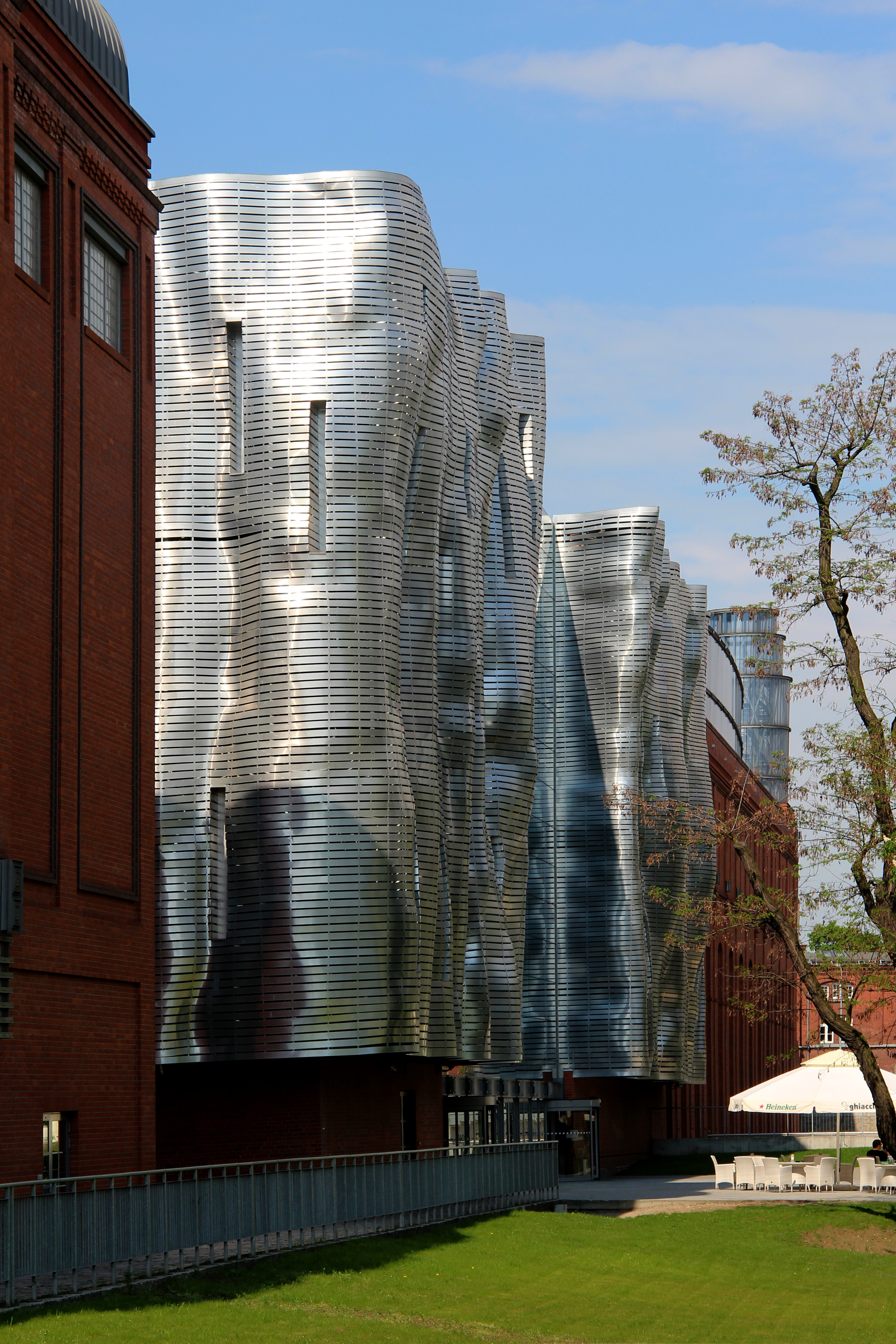
Stary Browar, part of the northern facade

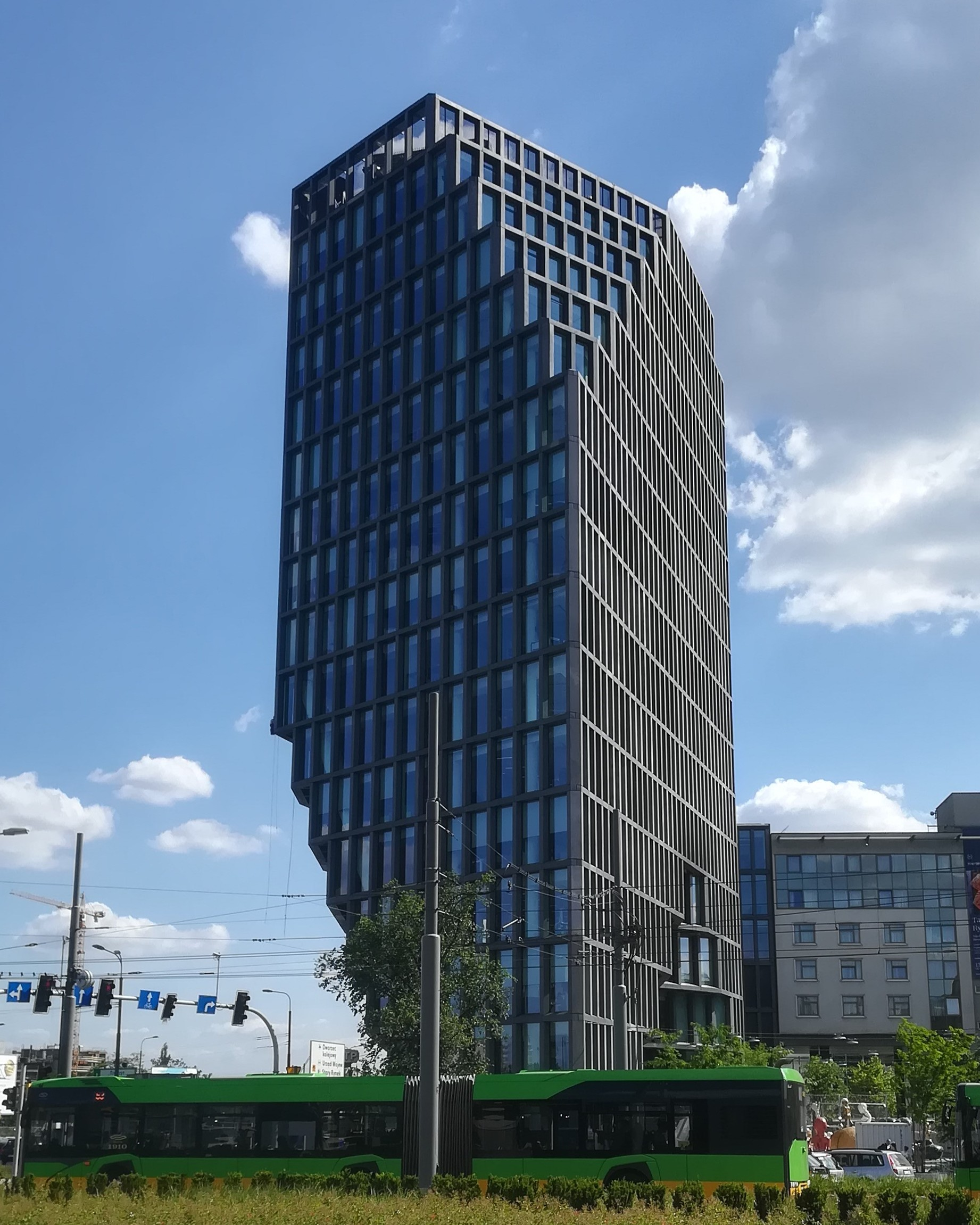
Bałtyk office building

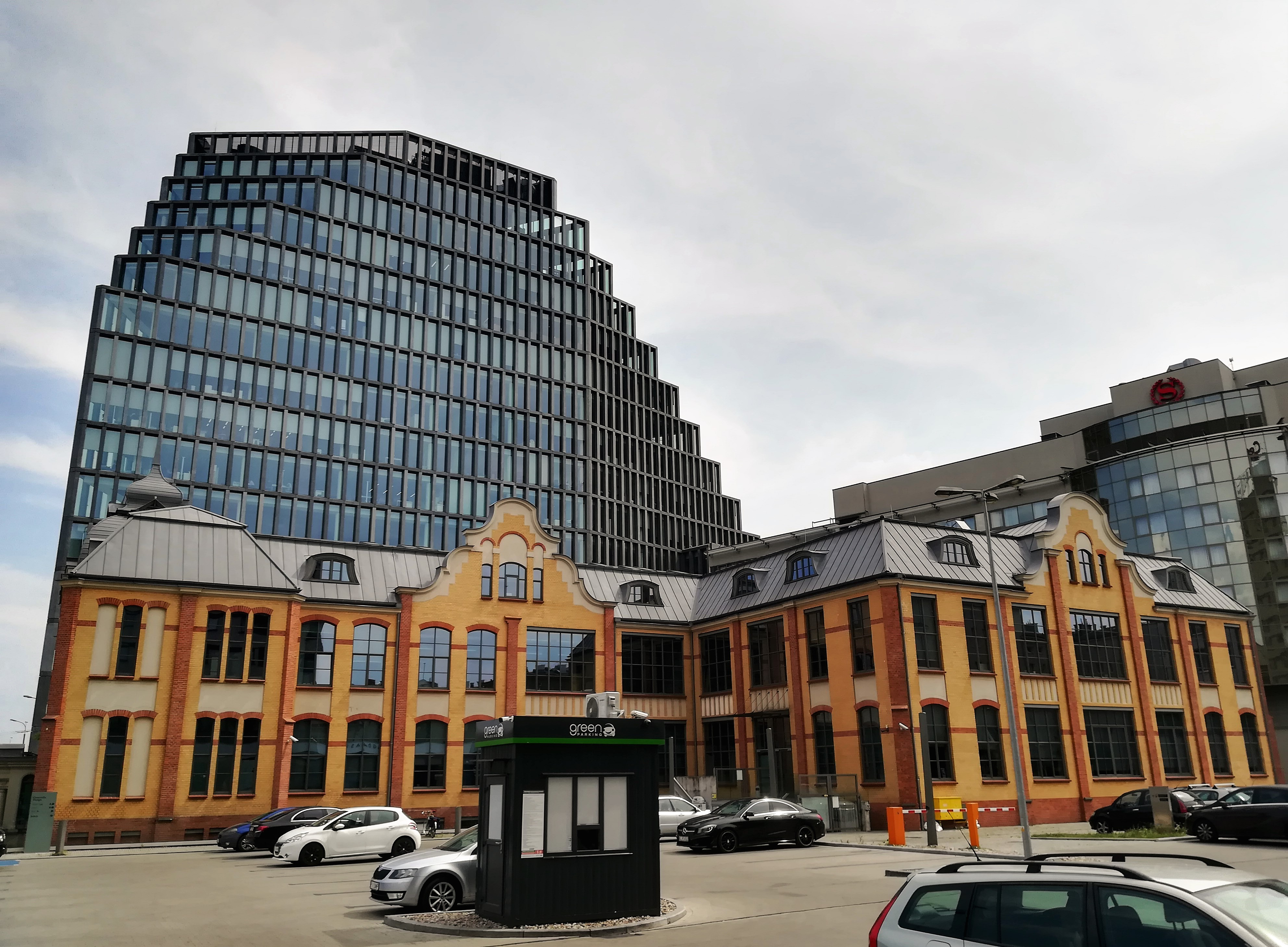
Bałtyk seen from the west, Concordia Design centre in the foreground

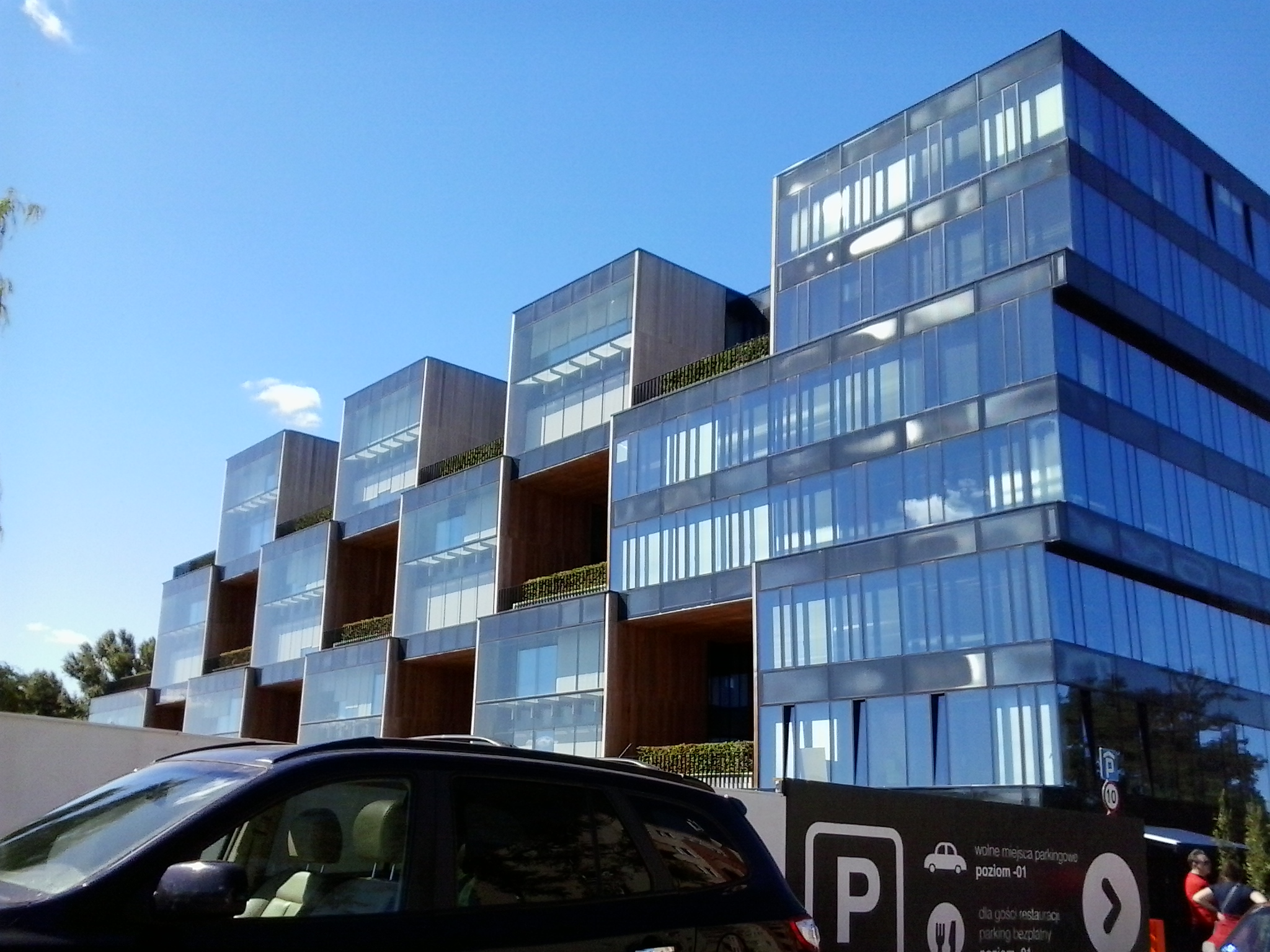
Pixel building – headquarters of popular Allegro e-commerce website

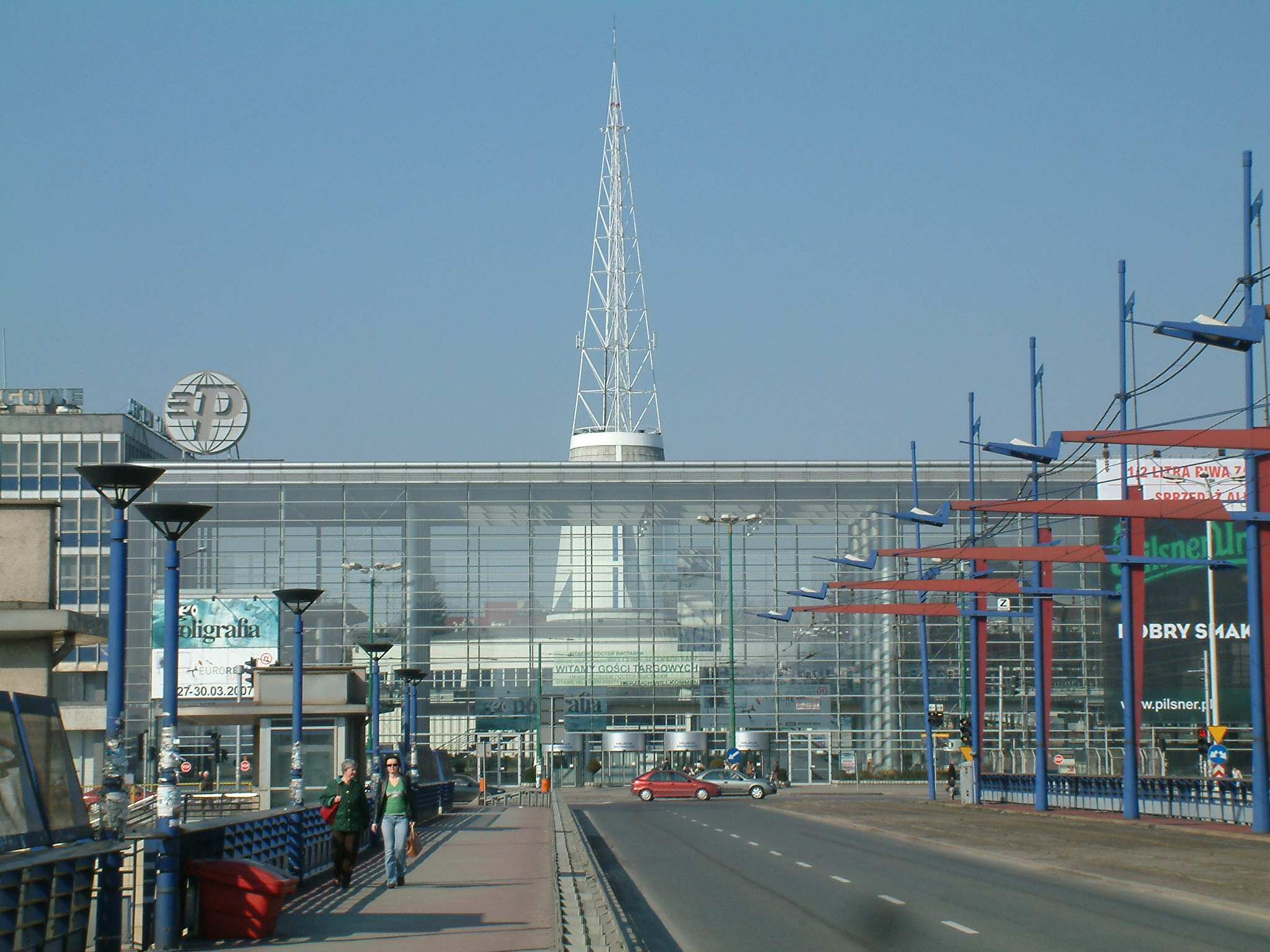
View at the Iglica of Poznań International Fair in 2007

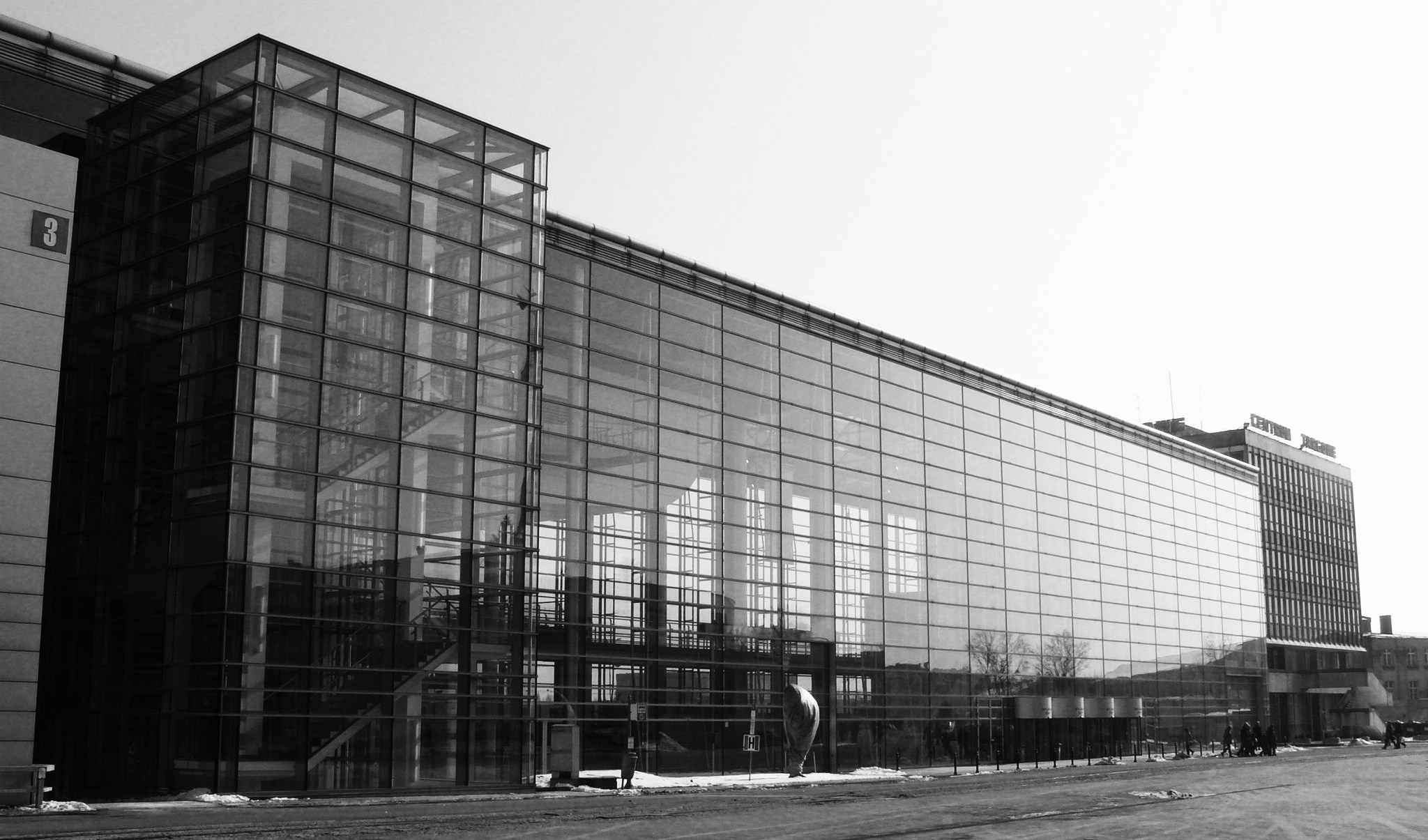
Main entry to Poznań International Fair

== Neighbourhoods ==
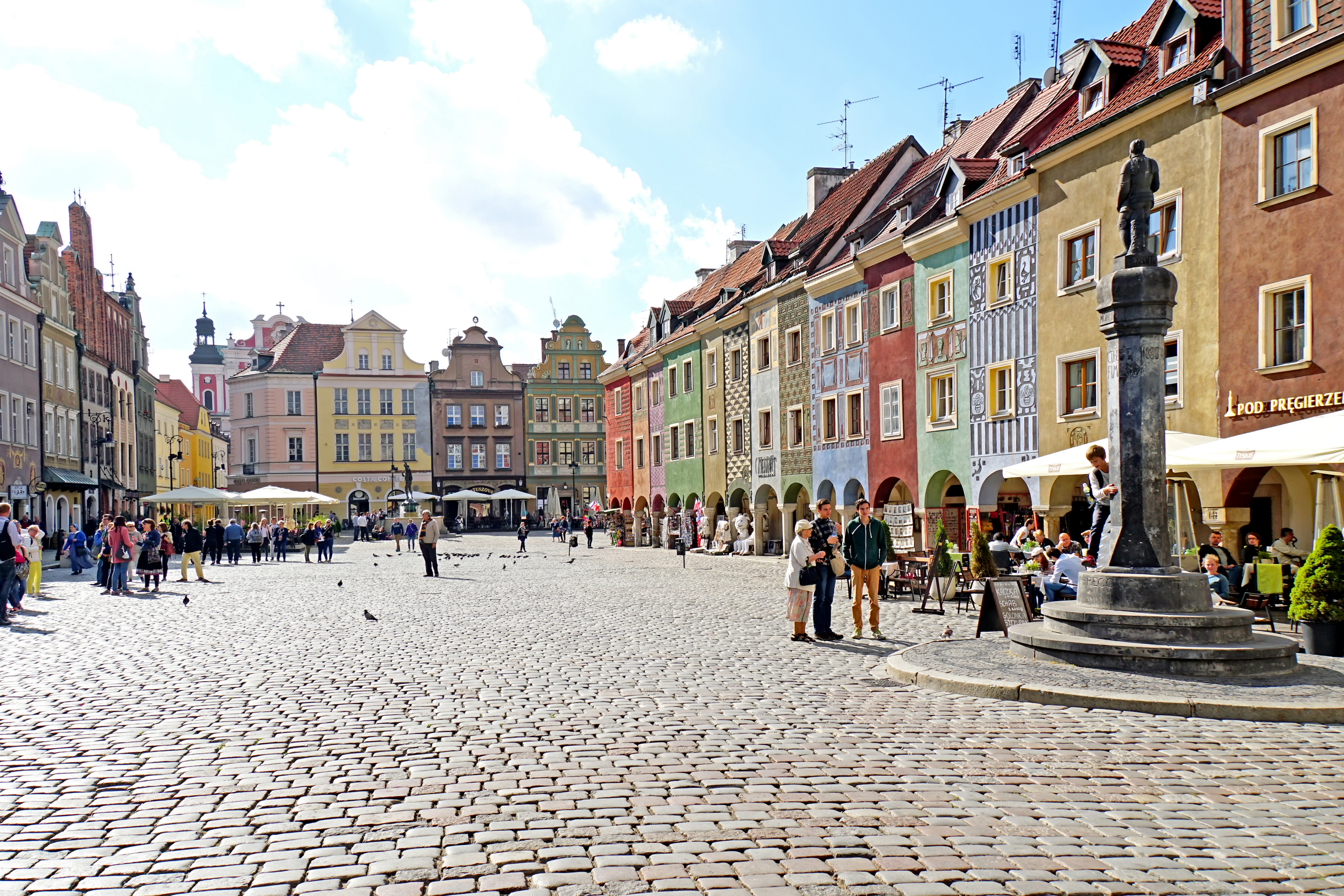
Old Town, a major tourist attraction

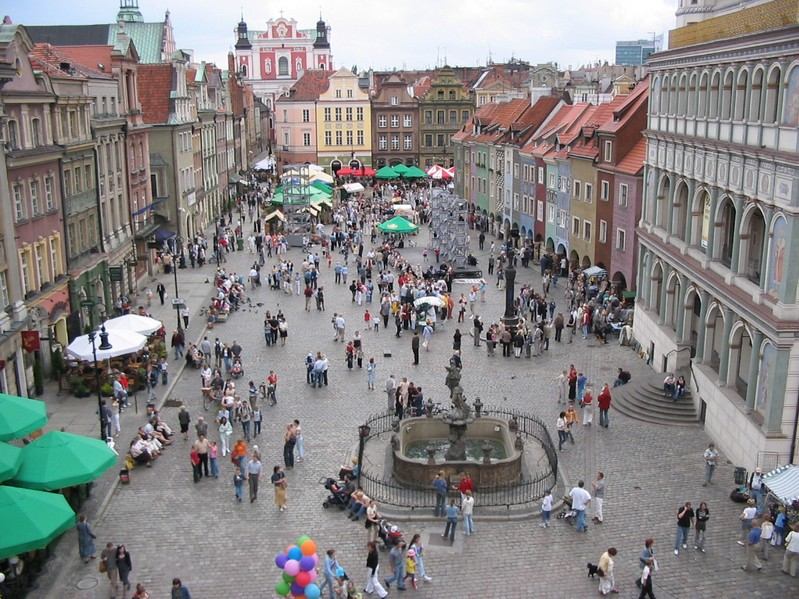
East part of the Old Market Square
