= Adam Harasowski =

Polish pianist and mechanical engineer

Adam Jerzy Harasowski
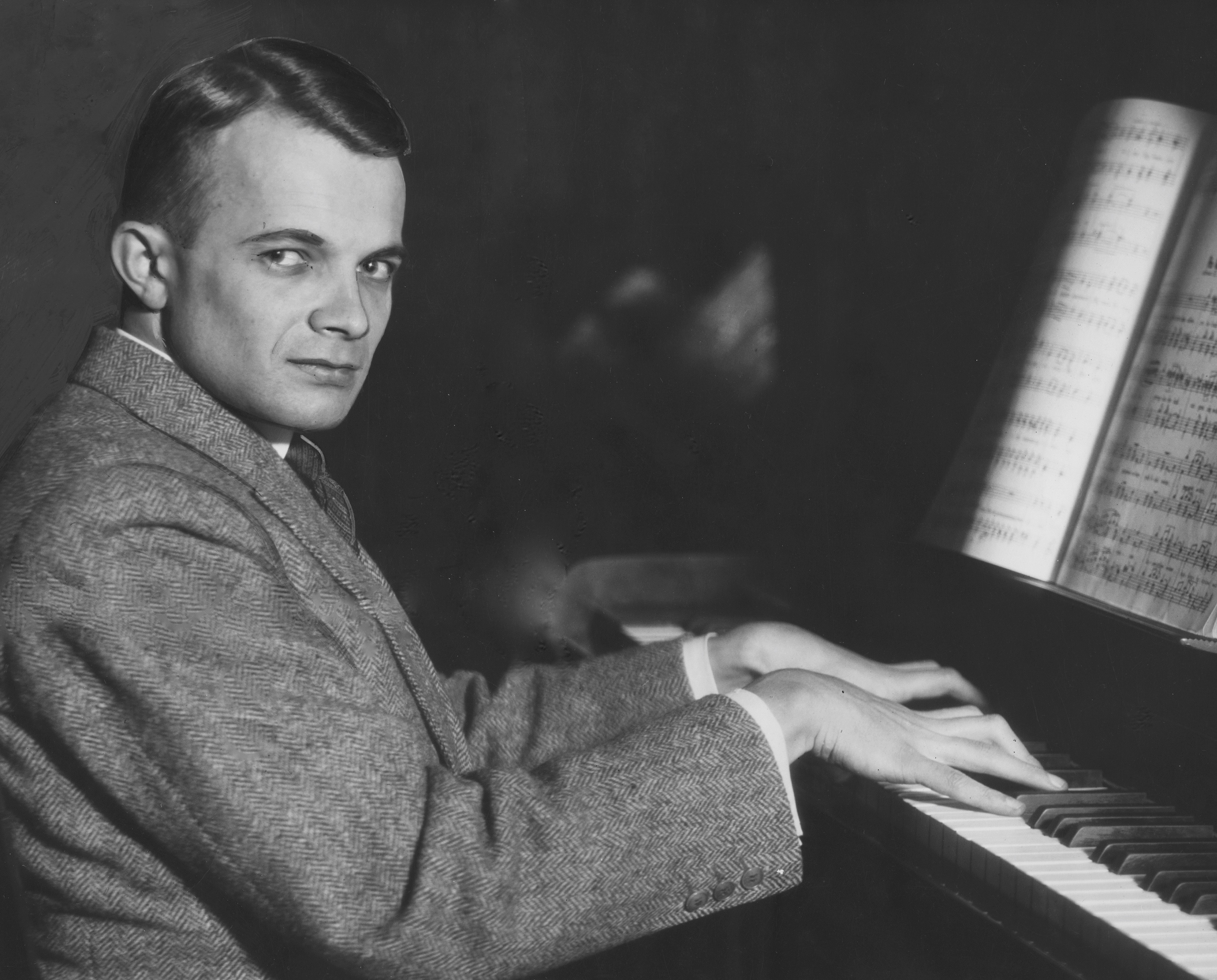
- Adam Harasowski at age 31
- Born: 16 September 1904; Deliatyn
- Died: 16 June 1996 (aged 91); Rownhams
- Burial place: Newark Cemetery, Newark-on-Trent
- Education: Conservatory of the Polish Musical Society in Lviv (1928); Lviv Polytechnic (1931)
- Occupations: Composer, Chopin scholar, mechanical engineer
- Spouses: Jadwiga Harasowska (m. 1938; died 1978) Joyce Meldrum (m. 1980)
- Relatives: Tadeusz Szeligowski (brother-in-law)
- Honours: Air Force Medal; Defence Medal; War Medal 1939–1945

Adam Jerzy Harasowski (16 September 1904 – 16 June 1996) was a Polish composer, conductor, pianist, Frédéric Chopin scholar, mechanical engineer, and polyglot. From 1939, he lived in the United Kingdom. He served as a technical officer in the Polish Air Force and subsequently as an officer and instructor in the Royal Air Force. Harasowski conducted Polish and British choral and operatic ensembles and authored works promoting Polish music to English-speaking audiences. He was married to the publisher and journalist Jadwiga Harasowska.

== Biography ==
=== Pre-war period ===
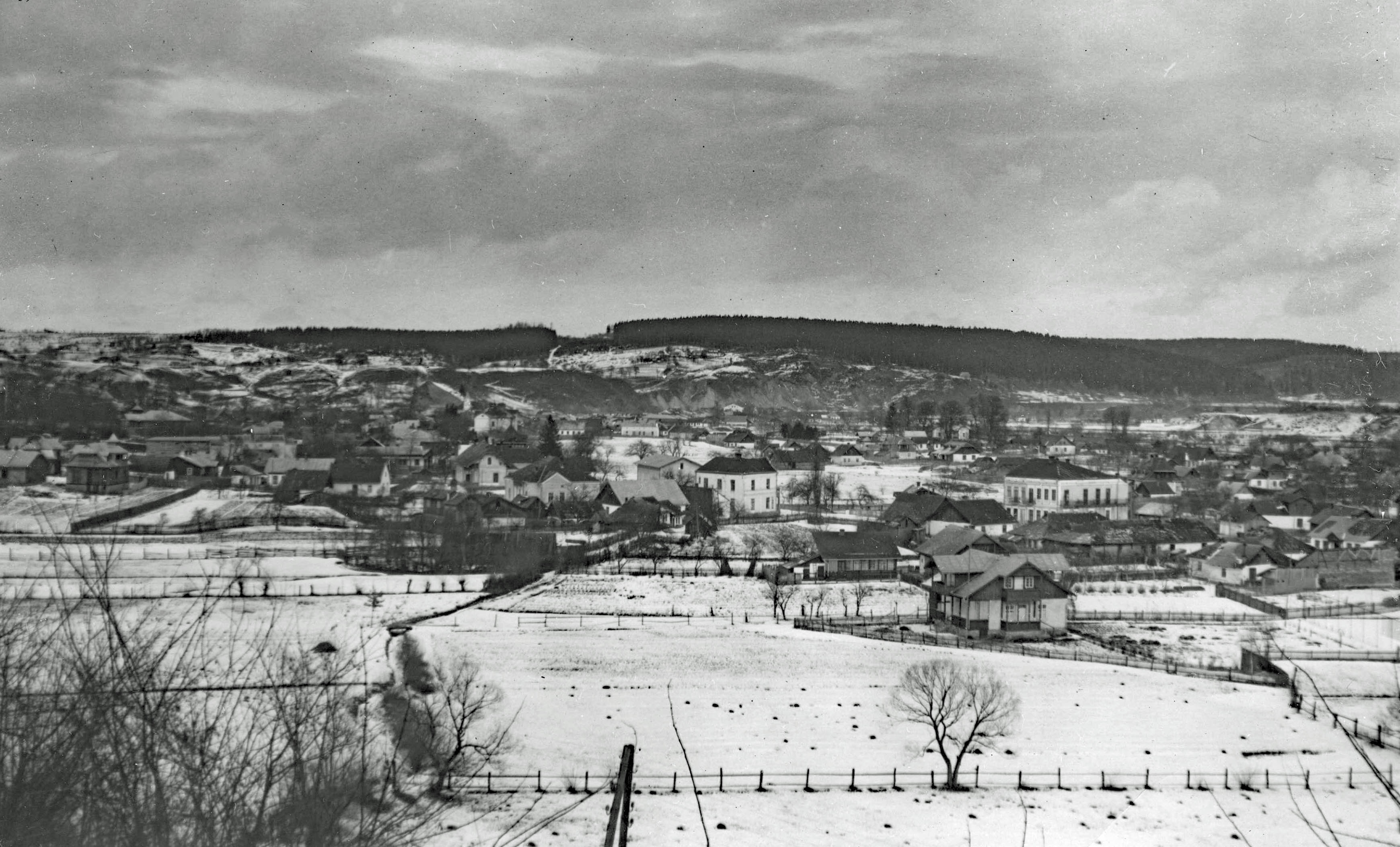
Spa town of Deliatyn on the Prut river, at the eastern foothills of the Gorgany mountains, in winter around 1918

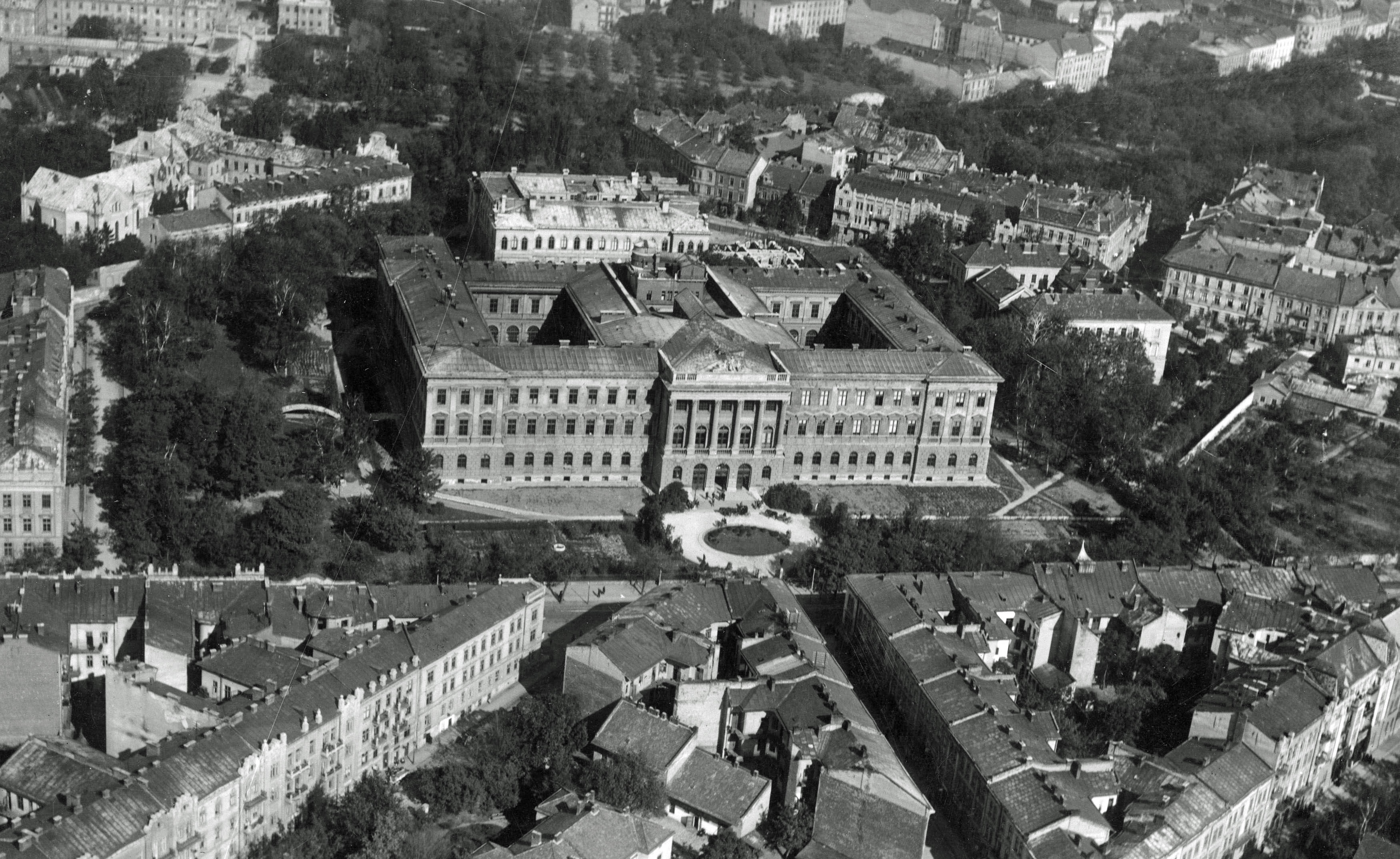
Lviv Polytechnic – main building in 1932

Adam Jerzy Harasowski was born in Deliatyn. He was the son of Aleksander Harasowski (1872–1945), a physician with diverse interests that included music, (Note: Aleksander Harasowski was the author of the book Lekarz domowy. Racyonalny poradnik dla chorych i zdrowych (Home Doctor: A Rational Medical Guide for the Sick and the Healthy) published in 1900 in Lviv, and served as a physician at the spa in Deliatyn.) and Roberta Nałęcz-Udrycka. On his father's side, he was related to Maurycy Karasowski (1823–1892), the author of the first biography of Frédéric Chopin. He was also the brother-in-law of the composer Tadeusz Szeligowski (1896–1963).

Harasowski completed his matura exams in Nowy Sącz. Between 1923 and 1929, he studied at the conservatory of the Polish Music Society in Lviv, where he was a student of Adam Sołtys. To support himself during this period, he performed as a piano accompanist for silent films. He subsequently received private lessons in composition from Karol Szymanowski. In 1927, he met G. K. Chesterton.

At the recommendation of Adam Sołtys, Harasowski composed incidental choral music drawn from classical Greek drama for a production of Sophocles' Antigone, using a modern Polish translation by Tadeusz Węclewski. In 1928, his work Obrona Lwowa (Defense of Lviv), a setting of a text by Artur Oppman for male choir and orchestra, was awarded second prize in a competition held by the Polish Singing Society "Echo-Macierz" in Lviv. His interest in choral music was influenced by his father, who had conducted the Academic Choir of the Jagiellonian University in Kraków during his medical studies.

Harasowski began piano lessons at the age of five and belonged to the Lviv piano school of Karol Mikuli, a direct link to the lineage of Chopin. In 1932, he took part in the II International Chopin Piano Competition.

Concurrently with his musical studies, Harasowski enrolled at the Mechanical Faculty of Lviv Polytechnic, graduating in 1931 with a diploma "in the field of machine and motion sciences". During his studies, he undertook annual internships abroad, including in Sweden (1929), France (1930), and England (Balderton in 1927 and 1930; Basingstoke in 1928). While in Balderton, he formed a friendship with Rita and Fred Wand, who later assisted him upon his arrival in England in late 1939.

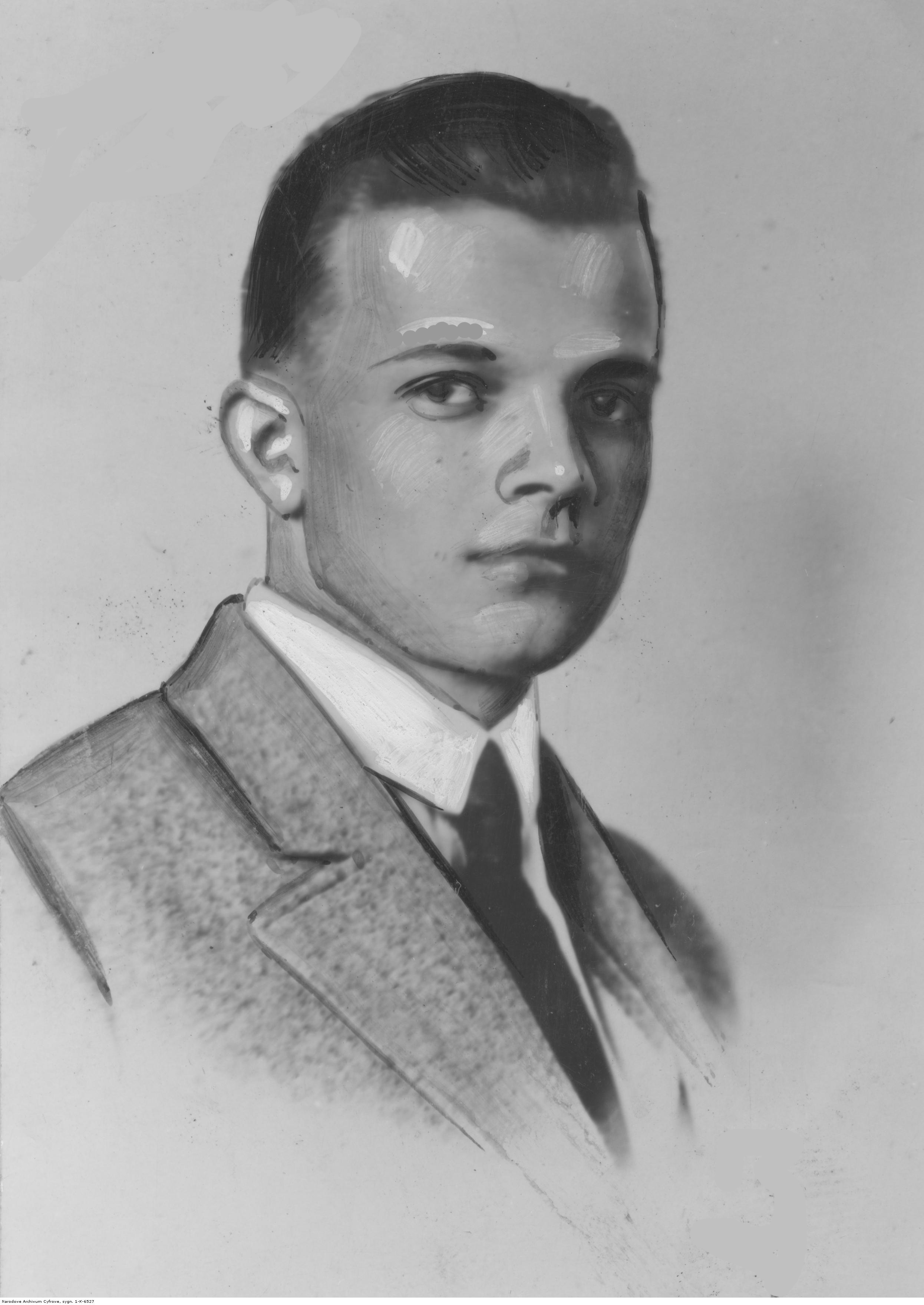
Adam Harasowski, 1932

From 1924 to 1929, Harasowski served initially as accompanist and, from 1926 onward, as conductor of the Lviv Technical Choir at the Polytechnic. The group's traditions were later continued (from 1946) by the Academic Choir of the Wrocław University of Science and Technology. The choir (Note: The period of Adam Harasowski's activities from 1924 to 1930 was the subject of a 1992 master’s thesis by Piotr Jaroński, written under the supervision of Professor Zofia Urbanyi-Krasnodębska at the Wrocław Academy of Music.) embraced the traditional Polish choral motto: "Through song to the heart, through the heart to the Fatherland". In 1927, it performed at events commemorating the 77th birthday of Czechoslovak Tomáš Masaryk. In May 1929, Harasowski's composition Lwów (Lviv), sung by the choir, "received a positive reception" at the Pan-Slavic Congress of Singers in Poznań.

Between 1931 and 1932, he underwent officer training at the cadet school in Lviv, including practical service with the 6th Air Regiment. Harasowski worked as a mechanical engineer at the "Dąbrowa" Glassworks in Huta Dąbrowa, Łuków County, for two years following graduation. He then held a position at the Royal Steelworks in Chorzów, Upper Silesia, until 1938. After Poland's incorporation of Trans-Olza in October 1938 and until the start of World War II, he was employed at the Třinec Iron and Steel Works, where components for aircraft were produced.

During his time in Silesia, he served as artistic director of a local brass band and symphony orchestra in Chorzów and as conductor of the male choir "Echo" (Note: The Katowice male choir "Echo" was founded in 1923.) in Katowice. A concert in May 1937 featuring works by Stanisław Niewiadomski under his direction was described in contemporary reviews as "a refined musical event", and Harasowski "proved to be an excellent conductor". The "Echo" choir broadcast on Polish Radio, presenting programs of Polish folk songs alongside English repertoire. In 1935, he composed the song Do polskiego morza (To the Polish Sea), with text by Witold Zechenter.

Harasowski maintained correspondence with Bolesław Wallek-Walewski, a conductor and director of the Conservatory of the Musical Society in Kraków. In 1938, he married Jadwiga Zbrożek, who worked as editorial secretary for the Kraków-based publishing house Ilustrowany Kuryer Codzienny and collaborated with Marian Dąbrowski.

In June 1939, Harasowski attended an international foundry congress in London, where he presented a paper on the Polish foundry industry. The paper was subsequently published in 1940 in the British Foundry Trade Journal and noted in a German specialist publication.

=== Wartime period ===
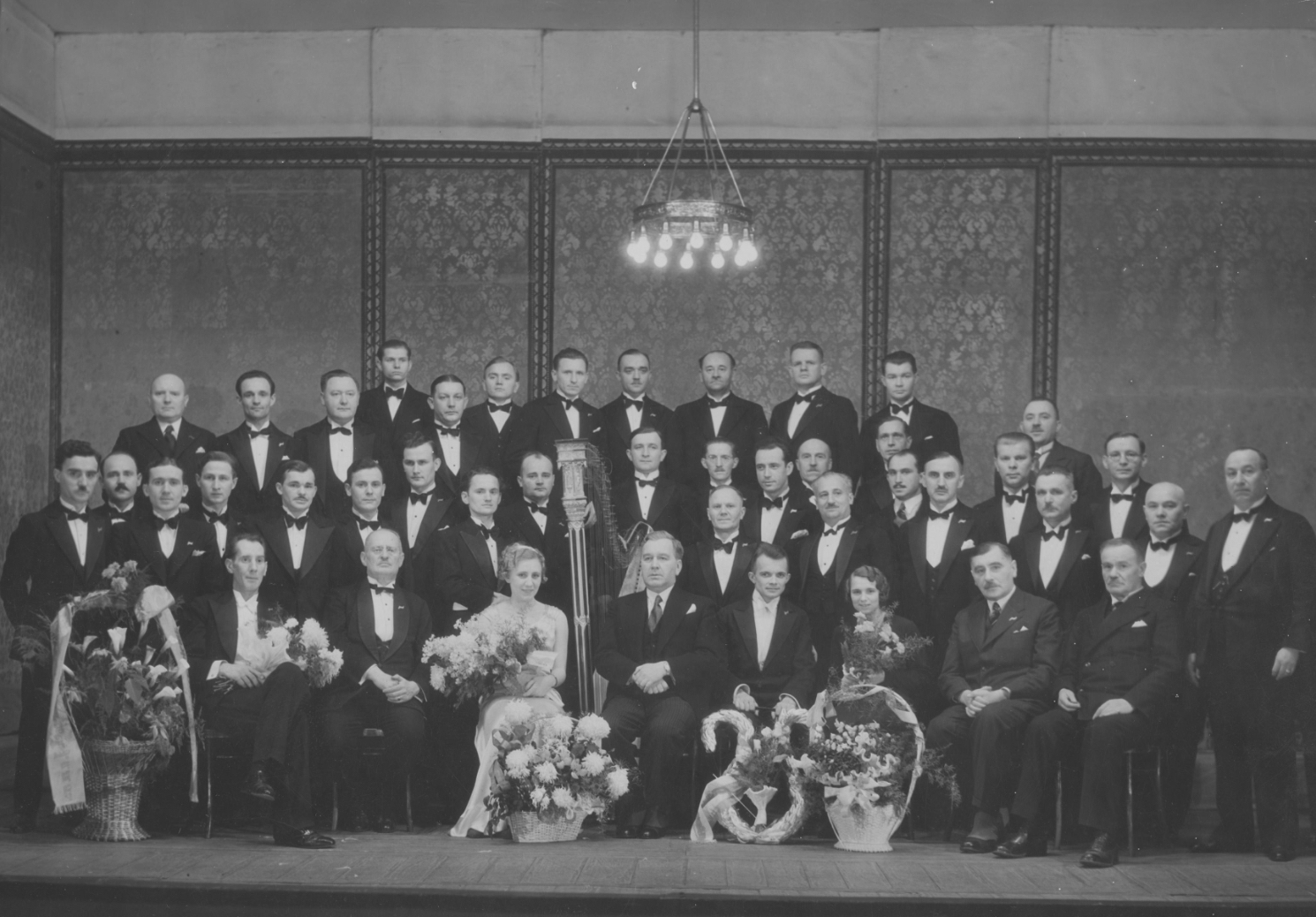
Conductor Adam Harasowski (seated fourth from the right) with members of the "Echo" choir in Katowice, 7 January 1936

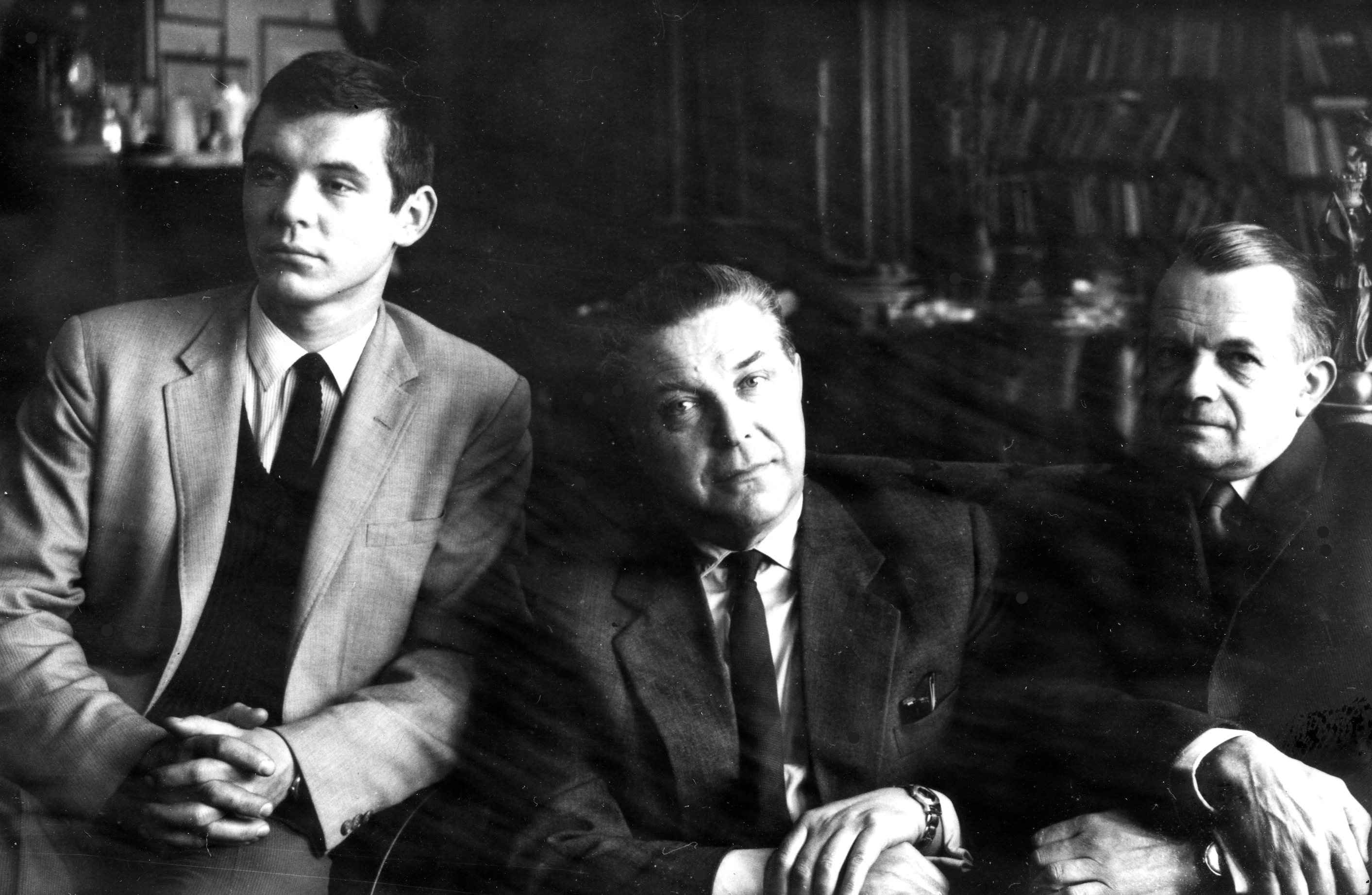
Adam Harasowski (on the right), Mieczysław Cena, and Krzysztof Cena after the funeral of Tadeusz Szeligowski in Poznań, 15 January 1963

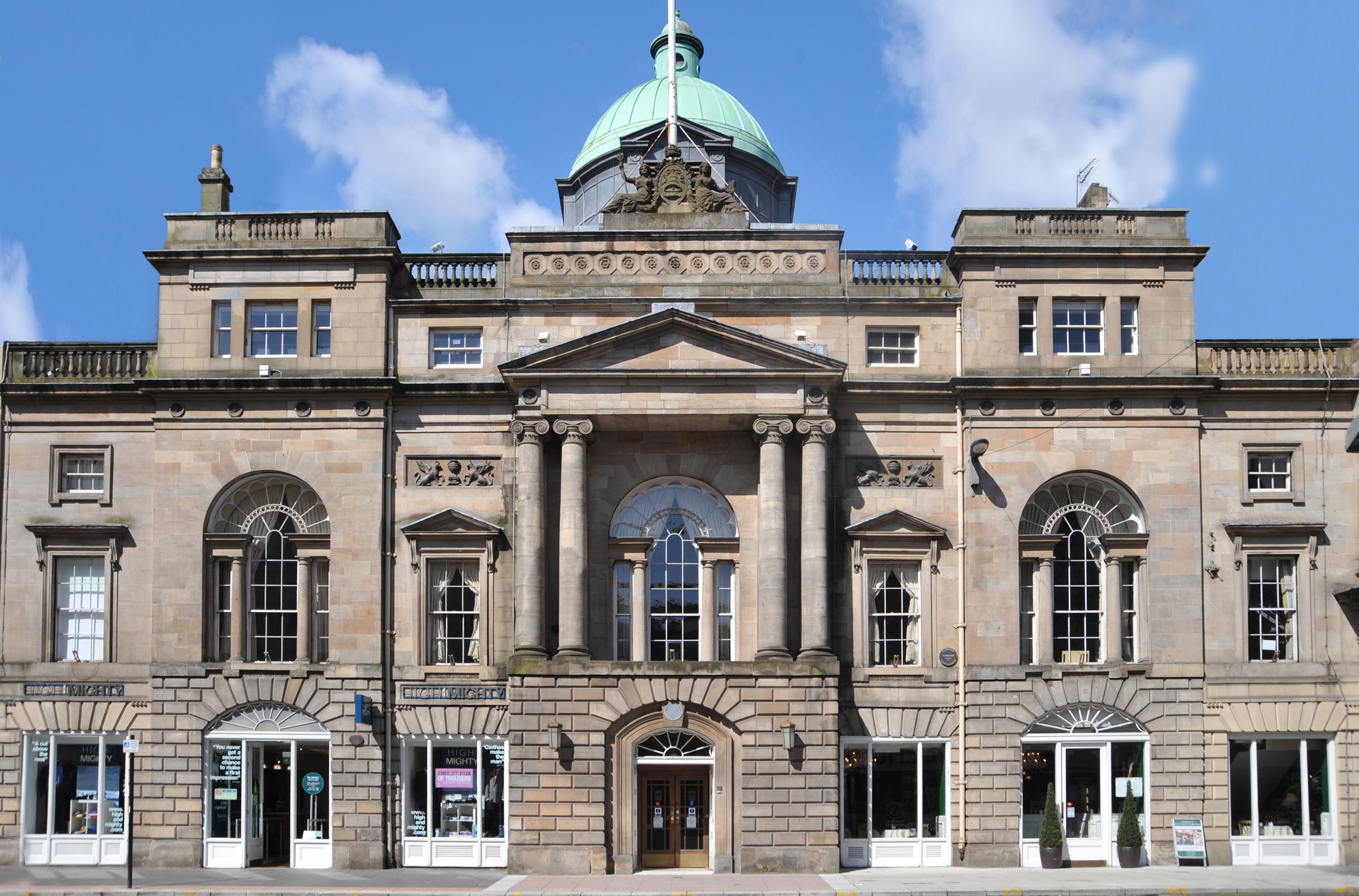
Trades Hall in Glasgow – the venue of Frédéric Chopin's recital on 27 September 1848, and of the commemorative concert 95 years later

Following the outbreak of World War II, Harasowski, as a Polish officer, was interned in late September 1939 in a prisoner-of-war camp in Balş, Romania. There he met Adam Kowalski, author of the song Modlitwa Obozowa (Camp Prayer), known also as Modlitwa AK, Modlitwa partyzancka, or by its opening line O Panie, któryś jest na niebie. Harasowski arranged the song for male choir, and the arrangement was performed at a soldiers' concert on the second Sunday of October 1939. The piece subsequently gained popularity among the Polish Armed Forces in the West and in the Polish resistance, and it continues to be performed. Commonly referred to as the song of the 2nd Polish Corps, it is incorporated into the liturgy of Polish émigré parishes for commemorative and funeral services.

Harasowski and his wife Jadwiga arrived in Glasgow, Scotland, in early 1940, where they "engaged in efforts to foster Polish-Scottish cultural relations". Jadwiga owned the Książnica Polska publishing house until 1953, producing newspapers, periodicals, and books for soldiers of the 1st Polish Corps after the transfer of Polish forces from France to the United Kingdom. The couple jointly authored a practical guide for Polish servicemen on British social customs and daily life.

Harasowski composed and arranged numerous works aimed at both Polish military personnel and British audiences, primarily to familiarize English-speaking listeners with Polish musical traditions; accordingly, much of this output was in English. On 27 September 1943, the 95th anniversary of Frédéric Chopin's recital in Glasgow, he appeared as solo pianist in a commemorative concert organised by Jadwiga, held in the same venue and at the same hour as the historic performance.

Harasowski served as the fourth conductor of the Polish Armed Forces in the West Choir, succeeding Jerzy Kołaczkowski, Henryk Hosowicz, and Otto Schaffer. Under his direction and over seven years, the ensemble presented more than 600 concerts across England, Scotland, and Wales. He also led the Frédéric Chopin Choir, established in Scotland in 1940 by Ludwik Skibiński-Orliński.

Hail to Song! – These words, which were the customary greeting among singers in pre-war Poland, took on a deeper meaning in exile, expressing not only longing for the Homeland but also a kind of duty to pass on to the new generation growing up outside the Fatherland the immortal charm of native song, which nothing can replace for a Pole.

— Adam Harasowski (1955)

As a technical officer in the Polish Air Force, Harasowski specialised in aero-engine construction and aircraft instrumentation. He was employed at various British military aviation establishments, principally for an extended period at the Royal Aircraft Establishment in Farnborough. For his service he received the Air Force Medal of the Polish Air Forces in France and Great Britain, as well as the British Defence Medal and the War Medal 1939–1945.

=== Post-war period ===
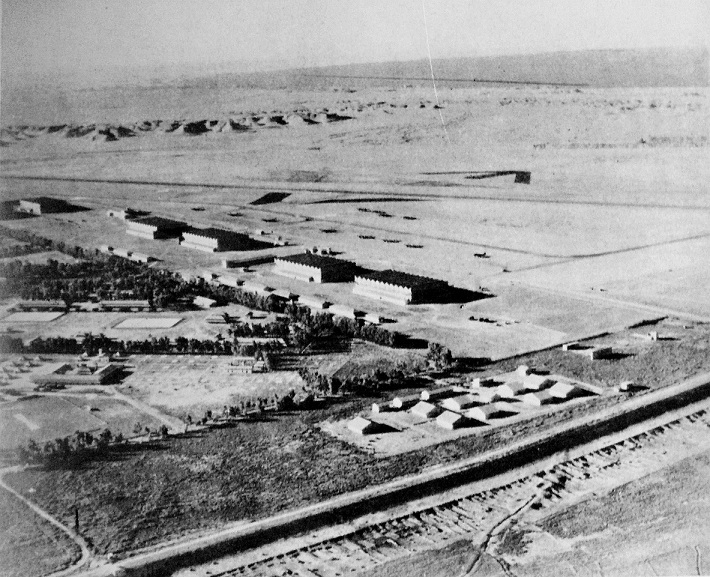
RAF Habbaniya base on the western bank of the Euphrates in Iraq – in the 1940s

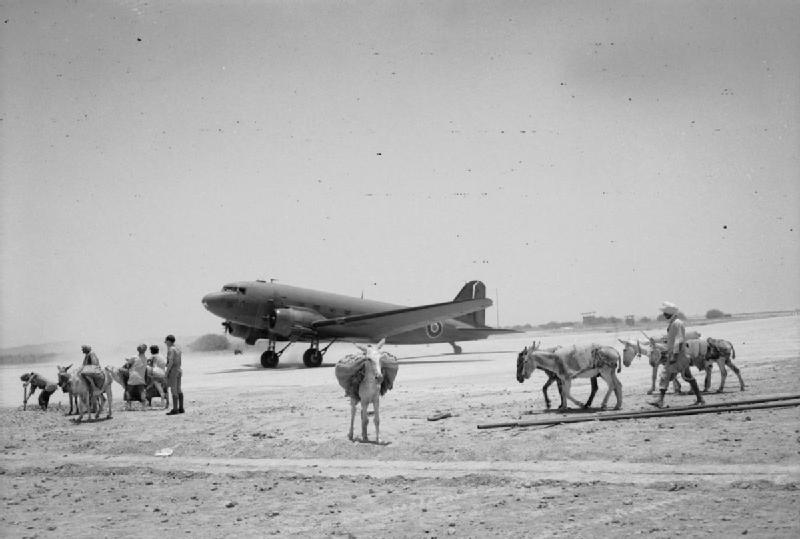
RAF Mauripur base near Karachi in Pakistan – in the 1940s

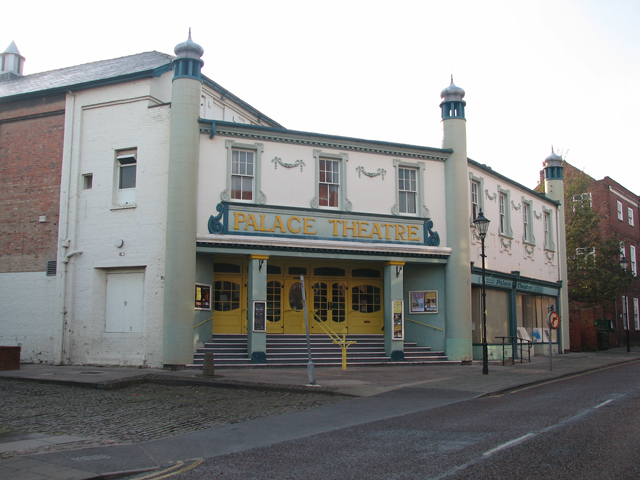
The Palace Theatre in Newark-on-Trent – venue for performances by The Newark Operatic Society

From 1945 to 1948, Harasowski served as a lecturer in aircraft engine design at the Royal Air Force base Cammeringham. On 4 October 1948, he was commissioned into the RAF Technical Branch as a Flying Officer, with seniority backdated to 23 May 1946. He assumed responsibility for aircraft technical maintenance at RAF St. Athan in Wales. Between 1949 and 1952, he was posted to British air bases in Habbaniya (Iraq), Amman (Jordan), and Mauripur (Pakistan), before returning to postings in England at RAF Topcliffe, Swinderby, and again St. Athan. He was promoted to Flight Lieutenant on 29 June 1950.

During his Near East service, he studied Arabic. Harasowski was a polyglot, fluent in English, German, French, Italian, Spanish, and Russian; (Note: In 1969, he taught a Russian language class in the adult education program at Newark Technical College.) in later years he also acquired proficiency in written Japanese.

Upon returning to the United Kingdom in 1952, he was stationed at Topcliffe, then Swinderby (1954–1957), and finally St. Athan, his last posting before retiring on a military pension. In 1955, he published the widely circulated collection Złota Księga Pieśni Polskiej (Golden Book of Polish Song).

From 1958 to 1980, he resided in Balderton, a district of Newark-on-Trent. Between 1958 and his retirement in 1970, he was employed as an engineer at Worthington-Simpson Ltd., a manufacturer of marine pumps where he had previously undertaken pre-war internships. He directed the company's translation office and an in-house design school for engineers.

Harasowski served for many years as musical director and conductor of the Newark Operatic Society. In 1961, the society's choir, under his direction, performed excerpts from the opera Halka with symphony orchestra, using an English translation. His arrangements of Polish songs with English texts were included in a music album issued repeatedly in the United States.

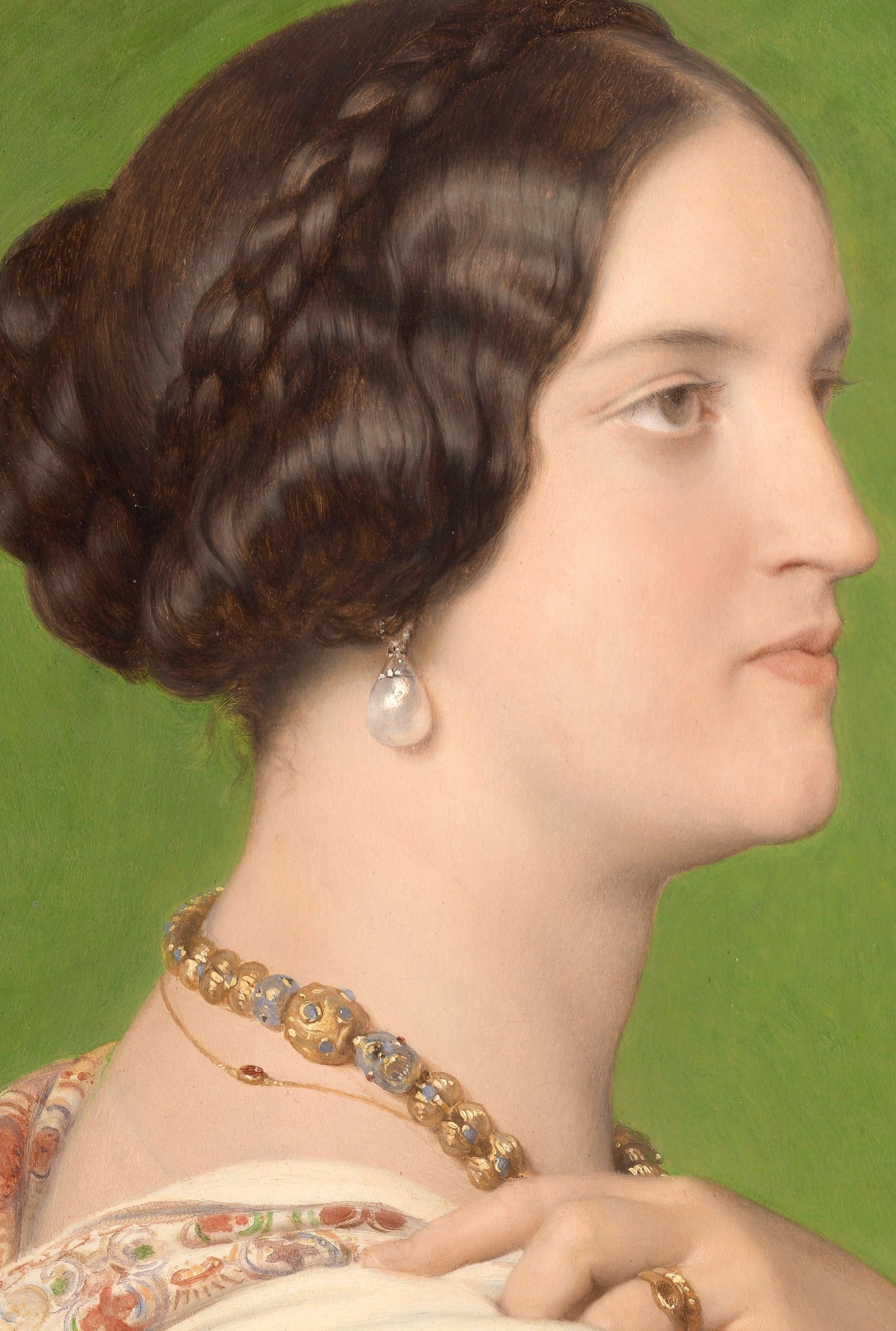
Delfina Potocka (1810–1877), portrait (1849) by Paul Delaroche (1797–1856)

Adam Harasowski's main work was the monograph The Skein of Legends Around Chopin, published in Glasgow in 1967. The book provides a critical analysis of over 40 contemporary biographies of Fryderyk Chopin, focusing especially on controversies surrounding the letters allegedly exchanged between Chopin and Delfina Potocka, which had implied an intimate relationship. Harasowski categorised Chopin scholarship into "works that propagated legends and those that debunked them". The volume included a foreword by Arthur Hedley and was reprinted in New York in 1977 and 1980. It received an extensive review in the London-based journal Wiadomości in 1968, and is considered a classic in the field. A debate between Harasowski and Hedley on the authenticity of the letters was broadcast on BBC Two on 21 April 1968. A portion of his subsequent, unfinished book on Chopin's music appeared in English in 1981.

Harasowski contributed numerous articles on Chopin's work to periodicals including Music and Musicians, Piano Quarterly, The Musical Times, and the Polish journal Ruch Muzyczny, as well as popularising pieces in Wiadomości. He corresponded on Chopin-related topics with scholars such as Arthur Hedley, Maurice Brown, Jerzy Waldorff, Krystyna Kobylańska, and Nicolas Slonimsky; Brown regarded him as "one of the leading authorities in England" on Chopin. In 1970, Harasowski and his wife Jadwiga established the London Chopin Society and the Scottish-Polish Chopin Circle in Edinburgh.

Jadwiga Harasowska died in Newark-on-Trent in 1978. In 1980, Harasowski married Judge Joyce Meldrum (later Joyce Harasowska) (Note: Joyce (1927–2021) used the Polish feminine form of her husband's surname – "Harasowska".) and moved to Rownhams, near Southampton. He continued active involvement in the local Polish community, including events of the Polish Club, charitable concerts titled "To Poland with Love", and the Southampton New Music Weeks. In 1989, he was awarded an honorary diploma by the Fryderyk Chopin Society for his contributions to promoting and preserving Chopin's heritage.

Amid renewed scholarly interest in Polish artists and cultural figures, especially those active abroad, Harasowski's efforts in safeguarding and disseminating Polish musical heritage, particularly through his Chopin research, are widely recognised as invaluable.

— Katarzyna Fuksa (2015)

Harasowski died on 16 June 1996 and was buried in Newark-on-Trent cemetery. Following his death, Joyce Harasowska donated the archives of both Jadwiga and Adam to the Emigration Archive at Nicolaus Copernicus University in Toruń, where they remain a resource for researchers. One historian of wartime and postwar Polish-Scottish-English relations has noted that "Jadwiga née Zbrożek and Adam Harasowski certainly deserve a separate monograph".
