= 1911 East German Exhibition of Industry, Crafts and Agriculture in Poznań =

German exhibition in 1911

East German Exhibition of Industry, Crafts and Agriculture 1911 in Poznań
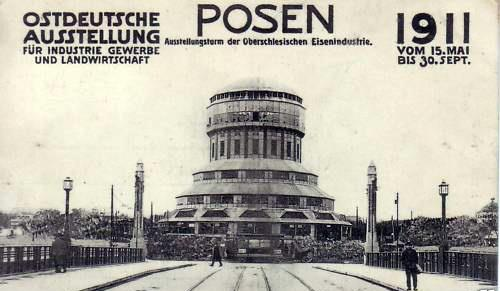
- Main entrance of the event
- Location of the exhibition
- Date: May 30 – September 30, 1911
- Location: Poznań, German Empire; 52.403583°N 16.909889°E

East German Exhibition of Industry, Crafts, and Agriculture 1911 in Poznań (German: Ostdeutsche Ausstellung für Industrie, Gewerbe und Landwirtschaft Posen) was an exhibition taking place from May 15 to September 30 of 1911 in Poznań. The focus of the exhibition was to show economic, social, and cultural achievements of Germans in Greater Poland, Pomerania, Silesia and East Prussia.

== History ==
The East German Exhibition was the first large exhibition held in Poznań. German Emperor Wilhelm II was the honorary patron of the exhibition. Thanks to the large funding provided by the emperor, the exhibition was very patriotic and highly decorated. Over a thousand exhibitors were gathered, mostly from Silesia.

Crown Prince Wilhelm opened the exhibition on May 15, 1911, on the plaza built under the Upper Silesian Tower (designed by architect Hans Poelzig). Apart from this, there were many topical pavilions and other attractions, for example:

- a model of the Poznań Old Town (Alt Posen),
- A hunting exhibition with a shooting range and a mock forest
- A Negro village (Negerdorf) with shacks, a store, craftsman's stations and a mosque, showing German achievements in Africa, in which 60 Africans lived permanently,
- A wooden coaster named "Tip of the Tips".

Part of the larger exhibition was the Gardening Exhibition located in the Botanic Garden (now Woodrow Wilson Park). The Gardening Exhibition was accompanied by the Cemetery Art Exhibition which included a large cross and an obelisk, which were incorporated into the decorations.

After the exhibition, some parts were left. The Concrete Hall of the Silesian Society of Concrete Construction (Betonhaus), which also housed a restaurant (later changed into a gymnastics hall), a circular music pavilion, as well as a Forstpavillon made from logs housing the forestry exhibition. Only two objects from the exhibition survive in their original form: a Norwegian-style church (currently located in Krzesiny) and the wine pavilion (now a restaurant called Meridian in Sołacki Park).

Guides pamphlets, photo albums, and postcards were among the items published for the exhibition.

== Tip of the Tips ==
Tip of the Tips

Ostdeutsche Austellung 1911
- Location: Ostdeutsche Austellung 1911
- Status: Removed
- Opening date: 1911
- Closing date: 1911

General statistics
- Type: Wood
- Tip of the Tips at RCDB

Tip of the Tips was a wooden roller coaster operating during the exhibition. Postcards show it with a large wall on two sides with a mural of mountains with a viaduct between two of them. It is significant as being the first roller coaster in what is now Poland.

== Gallery ==
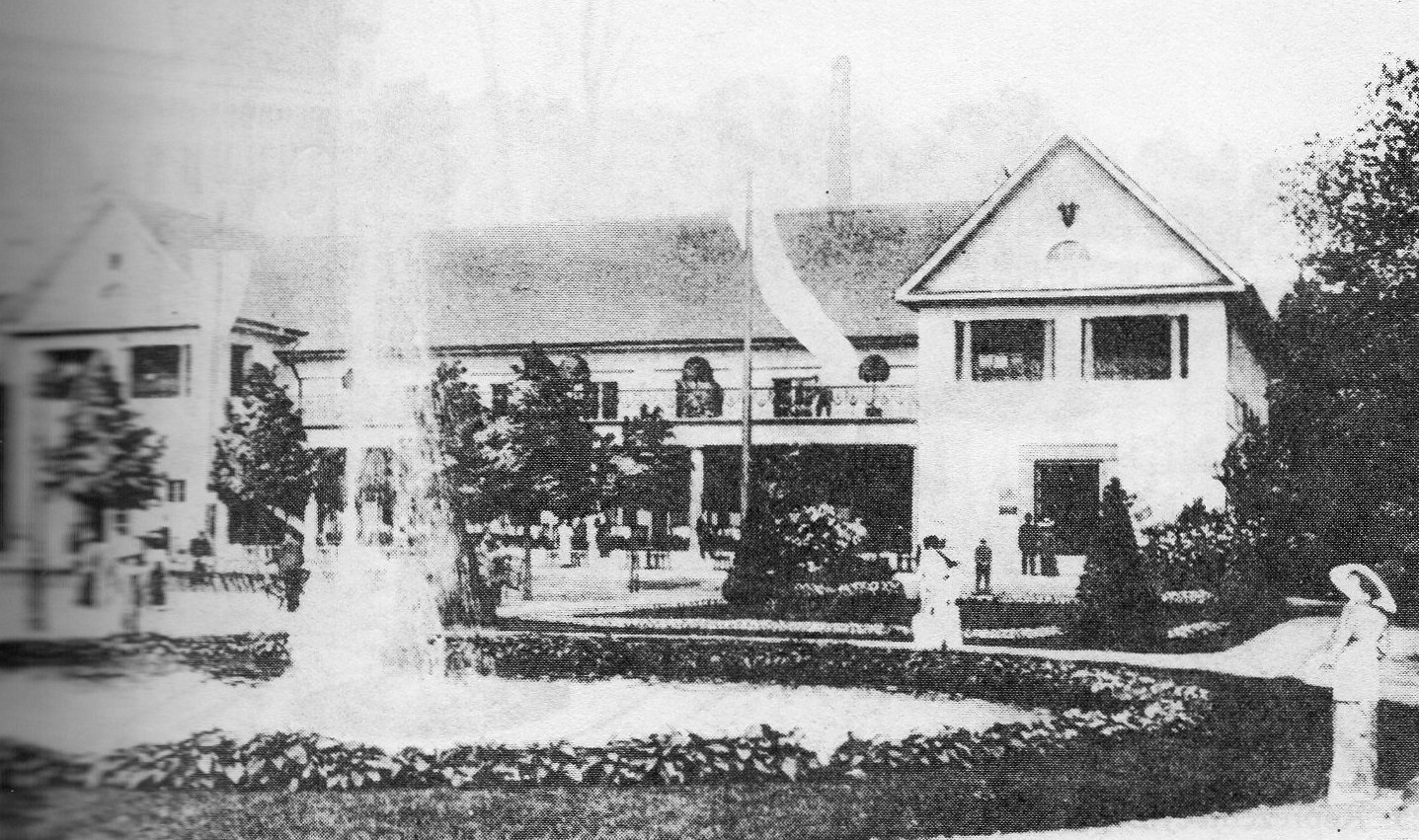
Betonhaus – Concrete Hall of the Silesian Society of Concrete Construction, one of the pavillions of the exhibition

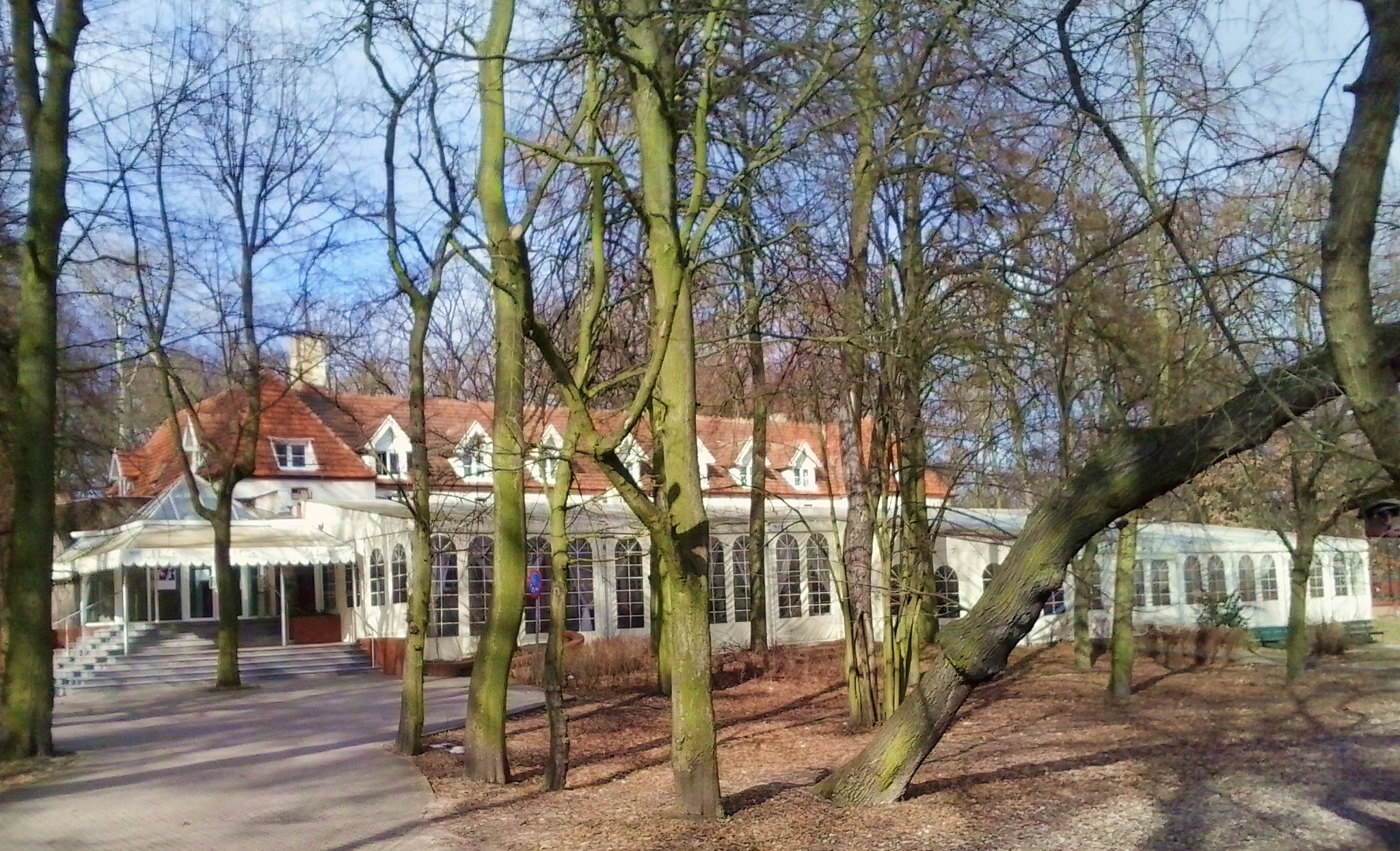
The restaurant Meridian in Sołacki Park

== See also ==
- Poznań International Fair (from 1921)
- Polish General Exhibition (1929)

== Bibliography ==
- Monika Lamęcka-Pasławska, 90 lat MTP - Spacerownik, Gazeta Wyborcza, Poznań, 13.10.2011, s.11-12
- Teresa Dohnalowa, Wystawy gospodarcze w Poznaniu w XIX i na pocz. XX w., w: Targi, jarmarki, MTP, „Kronika Miasta Poznania” 1996, nr 2, s. 73-77; https://www.wbc.poznan.pl/publication/156317
- Jan Skuratowicz, Architektura targów poznańskich przed 1920 rokiem, w: Targi, jarmarki, MTP, „Kronika Miasta Poznania” 1996, nr 2, s. 96-108; https://www.wbc.poznan.pl/publication/156317
