= Jadwiga Harasowska =

Polish publisher, journalist, and émigré activist (b. 1904)

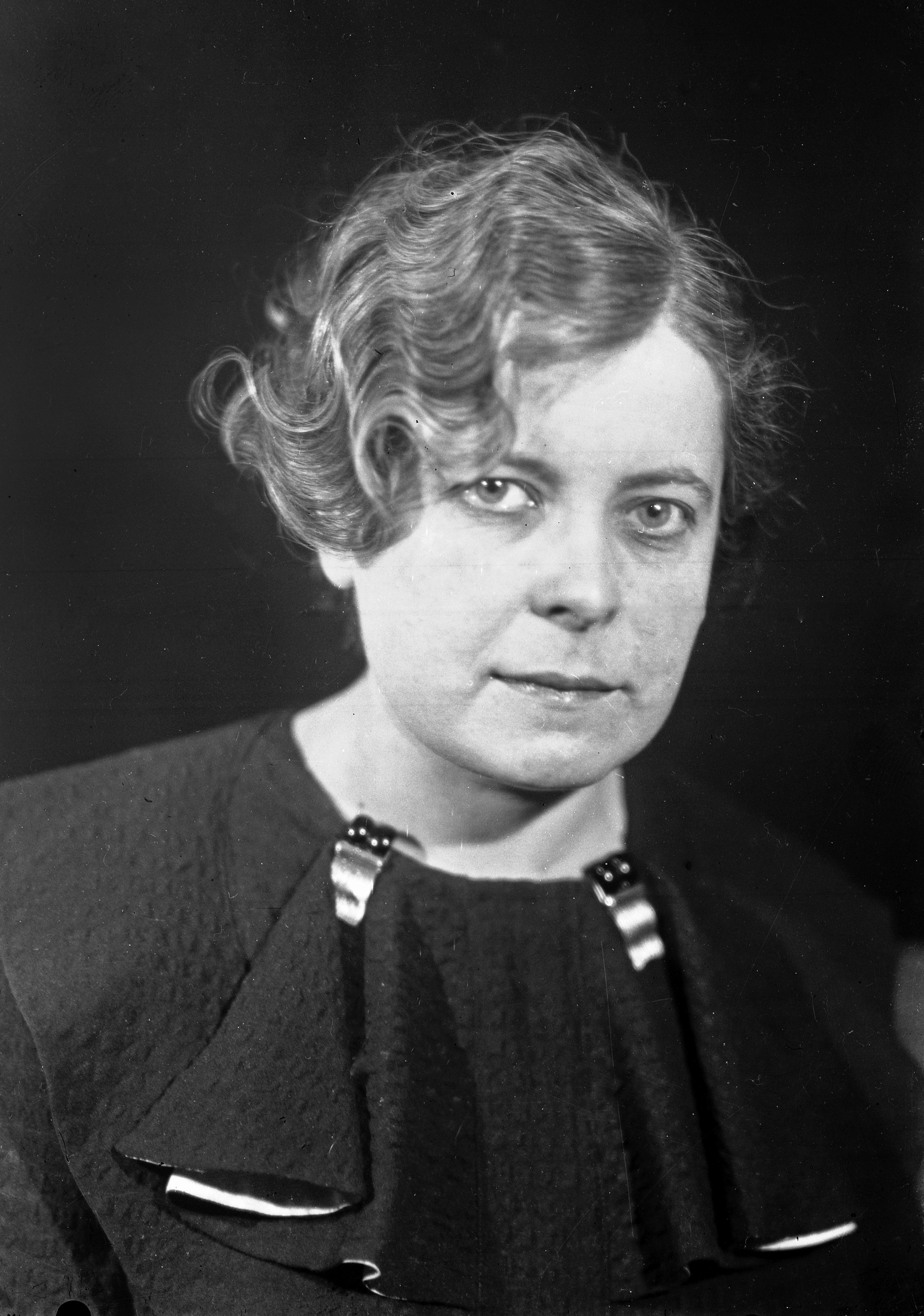
- Photographic portrait of Harasowska, 1935. From the National Digital Archives
- Born: Jadwiga Zbrożek; April 3, 1904; Kraków, Grand Duchy of Kraków, Austria-Hungary
- Died: February 11, 1978 (aged 73); Newark-on-Trent, Nottinghamshire, England
- Occupations: publisher, journalist
- Spouse: Adam Harasowski (m. 1938)

Jadwiga Harasowska, née Zbrożek, of the Jasieńczyk coat of arms (born 3 April 1904 in Kraków, died 11 February 1978 in Newark-on-Trent), was a Polish publisher, journalist, and émigré activist.

Before September 1939, she served as the editorial secretary of the Kraków press conglomerate Ilustrowany Kuryer Codzienny. Starting in early 1940, she engaged in publishing activities in Glasgow to support the Polish military stationed in the United Kingdom. She also organized cultural initiatives and fostered social ties between the Polish military and Scottish society, leaving a lasting legacy.

Harasowska co-founded Dziennik Polski i Dziennik Żołnierza, a Polish newspaper that continues to be published in London. She was married to Adam Harasowski, a composer, conductor, and engineer.

== Biography ==
=== Pre-war period ===
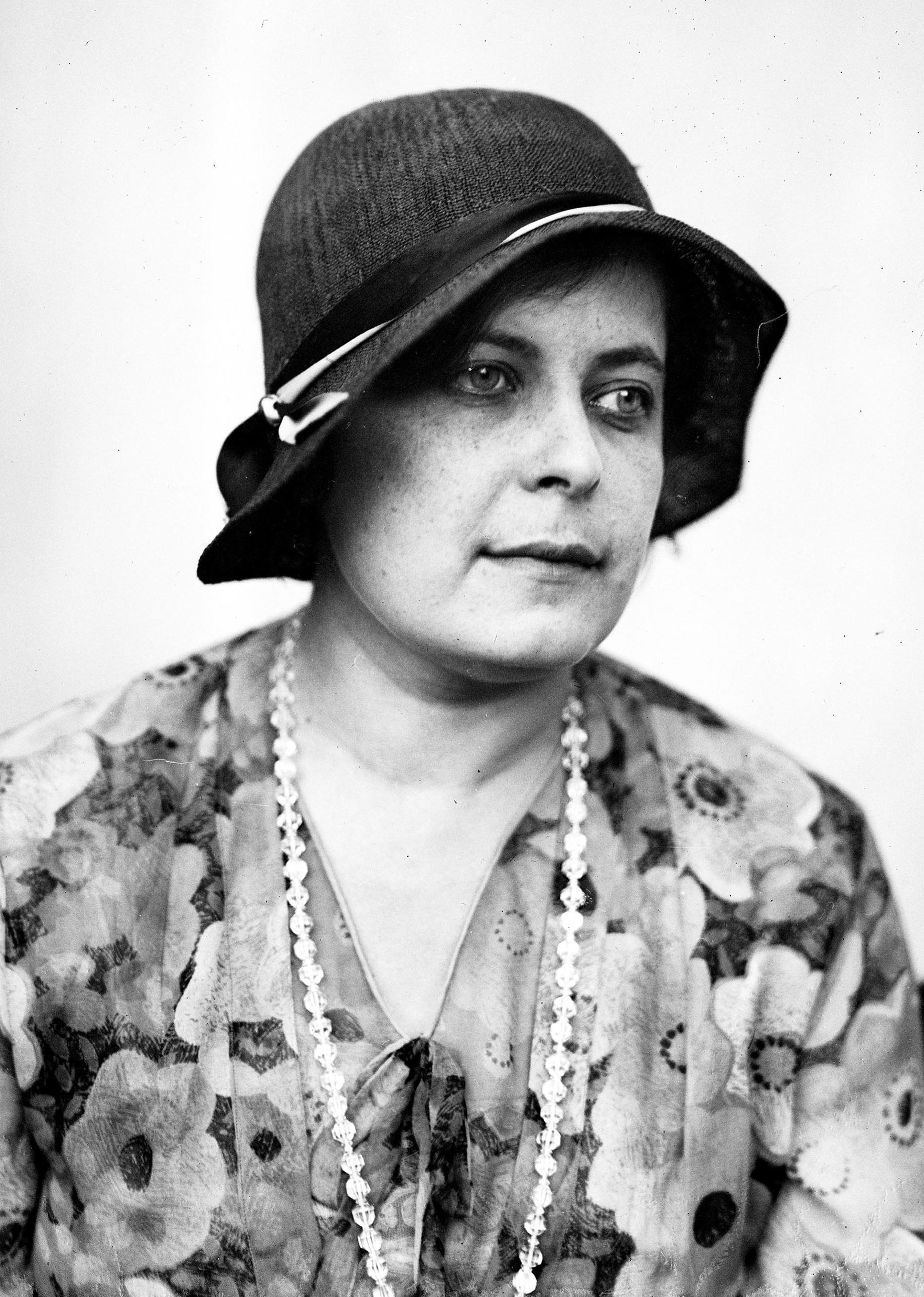
Jadwiga Zbrożek, 1931

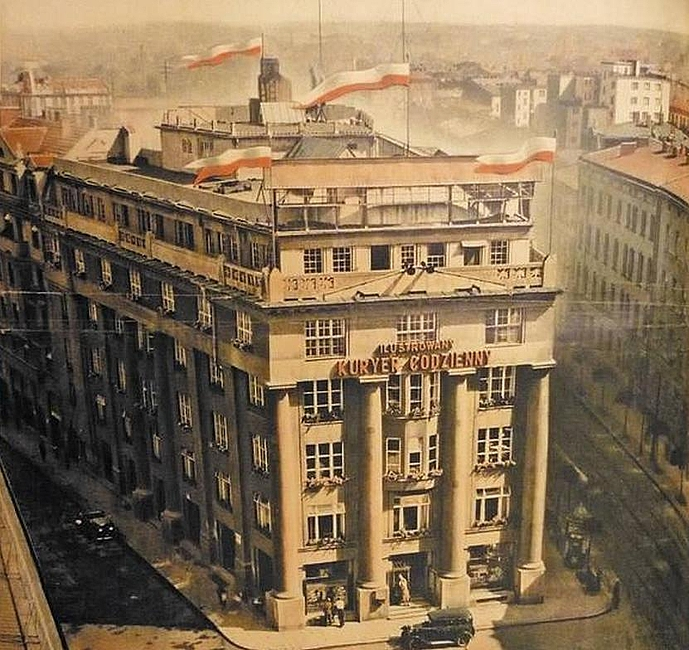
The Press Palace in Kraków – headquarters of the Ilustrowany Kurier Codzienny publishing conglomerate in 1935

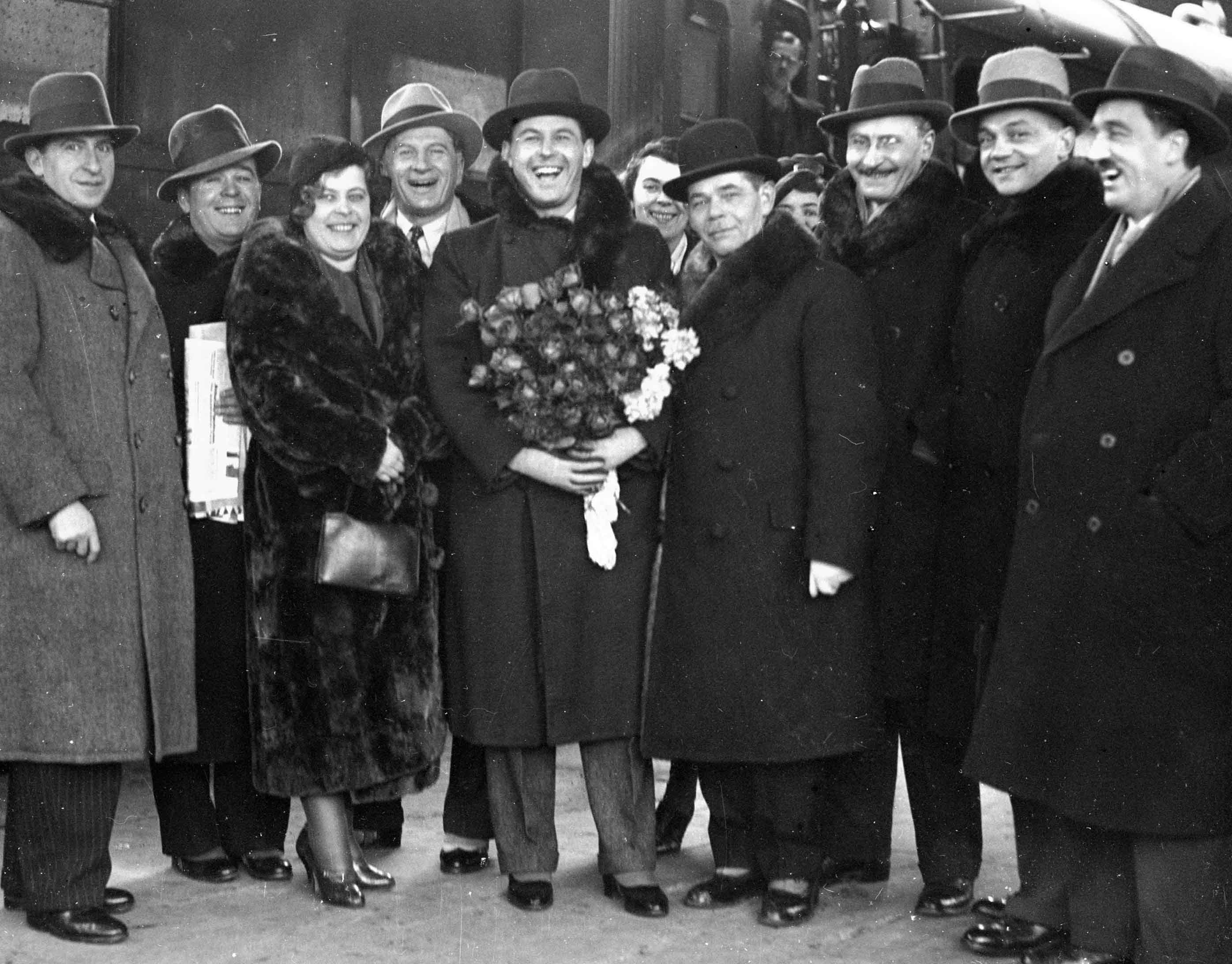
Farewell to Jan Kiepura (holding flowers) at the Kraków train station by Ilustrowany Kurier Codzienny editorial secretary Jadwiga Zbrożek (third from left) and Adamo Didur (fourth from left) in January 1935

She graduated from the Adam Mickiewicz Women's Division School and a teachers' seminary in Kraków. She studied at the Music Institute in Kraków and the Kraków Academy of Commerce, where she also taught singing and led choirs. She was the initiator of the Kraków Oratorio Society.

Beginning in 1927, she served as the secretary and assistant to Marian Dąbrowski, owner of the Ilustrowany Kuryer Codzienny publishing conglomerate in Kraków. After a few years, she assumed the position of editorial secretary for the entire conglomerate. She also worked as an editor of graphic designs and special editions. Additionally, she edited the illustrated weekly magazine As, published by Ilustrowany Kuryer Codzienny since 1935, which was targeted at "elegant clientele". She contributed her own articles on cultural topics to the magazine. She represented the conglomerate in public relations and used the surname Zbrożek professionally.

In April 1938, she married composer and conductor Adam Harasowski. She continued to write articles on cultural topics for As, the popular weekly published by Ilustrowany Kuryer Codzienny since 1935. She also corresponded with Bolesław Wallek-Walewski, a choir conductor and director of the Academy of Music in Kraków. At the end of September 1939, along with a group of journalists from Ilustrowany Kurier Codzienny, she evacuated to Lviv and later to Romania, where she reunited with her husband.

=== Wartime period ===
From an internment camp in Romania, she traveled through Italy and France to England. She arrived at the port of Folkestone on 24 November 1939 and, four days later, registered with her husband at the Nottinghamshire County Police Station in Newark-on-Trent, where Adam had previously completed an engineering internship. At the beginning of 1940, they moved to Glasgow, Scotland, and "undertook a consistent program of Polish-Scottish cultural rapprochement".

In Glasgow, Jadwiga Harasowska founded and managed the Polish publishing house Książnica Polska. Almost immediately, she began press activities, regularly contributing a column titled Polish Chronicle in a local newspaper for Polish soldiers unfamiliar with English. At that time, wounded Polish soldiers from the Norwegian and French campaigns began arriving in Scottish hospitals. For them, she soon established the newspaper Kuryer Glasgowski, which after a few issues was renamed Wiadomości Polskie. She collaborated with the William MacLellan printing house and publishing company. She published a popular brochure on everyday customs in Britain, authorship of which is attributed to her and her husband.

In 1941, she co-authored an English language textbook for soldiers. Several times, she published Modlitwa obozowa by Adam Kowalski in various arrangements by Adam Harasowski. The song became a prayer of the Polish Armed Forces in the West as well as the Home Army in occupied Poland, where it reached through parachute drops. In 1940, together with her husband, she published several volumes of Polish Christmas Carols – Najpiękniejsze Polskie Kolędy. Additionally, they edited a Polish column in the Sunday Chronicle. In early autumn 1941, she opened the Polish Shop – Polski Sklep in Glasgow, where Polish publications and souvenirs were sold, and consignment services were offered. She used the pseudonym "Jadwiga from Glasgow".

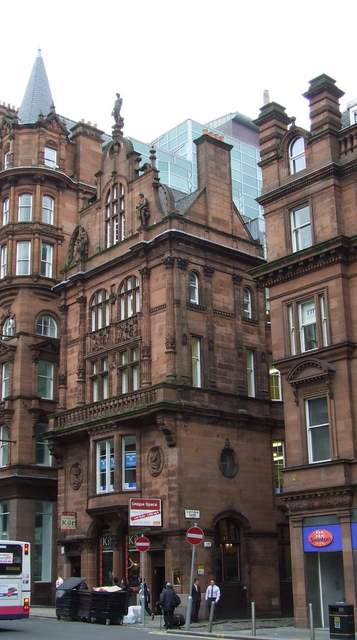
Hope Street, one of Glasgow's main streets, was the address of Książnica Polska in the 1940s

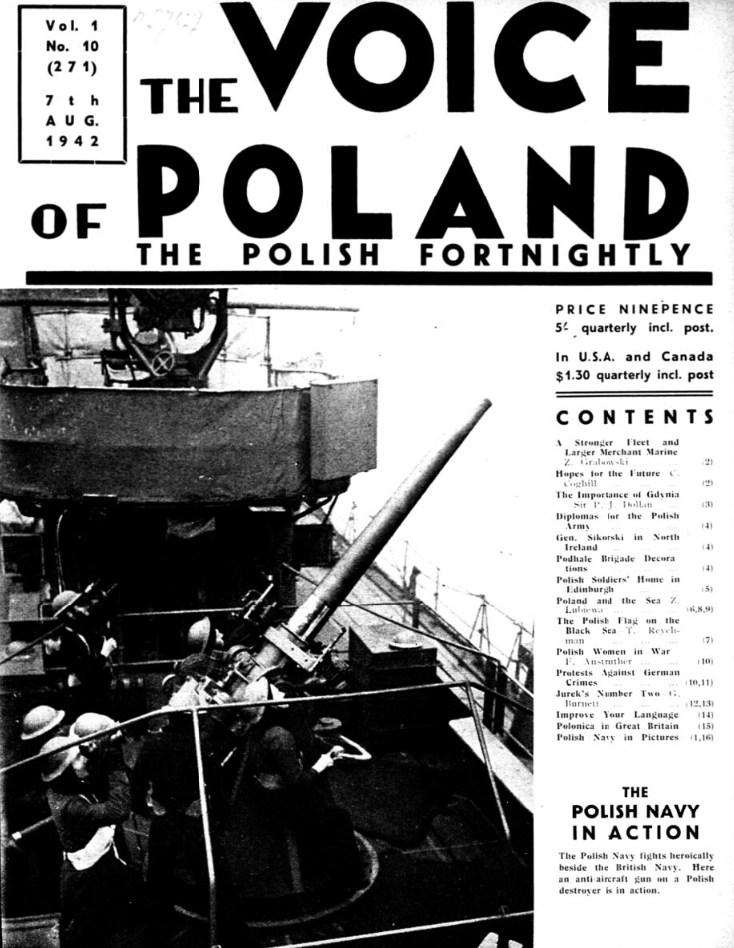
Issue of The Voice of Poland – The Polish Fortnightly from 7 August 1942 featured information for Polish soldiers of the First Corps

Jadwiga Harasowska published informational materials for Polish soldiers of the First Corps immediately after the relocation of the Polish Armed Forces from France to the United Kingdom. The English-language editions of these publications served as a source of information about Polish affairs for British audiences. On 21 September 1942, President Władysław Raczkiewicz visited the Książnica Polska headquarters and the editorial office of Dziennik Żołnierza, which was being published by Jadwiga Harasowska at that time. During this period, Książnica received support from the Polish government through the Fund for National Culture. In December 1943, Dziennik Żołnierza merged with Dziennik Polski in London. Under the combined name Dziennik Polski i Dziennik Żołnierza, it became the most popular publication among the Polish émigré community in the United Kingdom.

In 1940, she initiated the creation of The Scottish-Polish Society with branches in Edinburgh and Glasgow. Jadwiga Harasowska and Sir Patrick Dollan (1885–1963) were co-chairs of the Glasgow branch. By the end of the war, the society had 35 branches with nearly 10,000 members from Scottish society, fostering cultural support and social relations between the Polish army and the Scottish population.

Jadwiga Harasowska was one of the promoters of the establishment of Polish higher education during the war in Scotland, where, from February 1941 (until March 1949), the Polish School of Medicine operated as part of the University of Edinburgh (227 medical diplomas were awarded), along with Polish faculties of veterinary medicine, law, and education. Glasgow was a center for Polish agricultural, commercial, and polytechnic education. The Scottish-Polish Society organized Scottish-Polish clubs, lectures on Polish history and culture, and regular visits of Polish soldiers to Scottish homes.

From January 1941 to April 1942, Jadwiga Harasowska published the bilingual weekly Ogniwo Przyjaźni – The Clasp of Friendship, and later, until 10 October 1947, the biweekly Voice of Poland. Ogniwo Przyjaźni – The Clasp of Friendship was sent to Polish forces stationed in the Middle East. In 1941, she published Halka by Stanisław Moniuszko in Glasgow, with a foreword by her. This opera was performed by the University College London in 1961. On the 95th anniversary of Frédéric Chopin's recital in Glasgow (27 September 1848), she organized a concert featuring pianists Jerzy Sulikowski and Adam Harasowski on the same day (27 September 1943), at the same time, and in the same hall.

For the soldiers of the 2nd Polish Corps (under General Władysław Anders) stationed in Mandatory Palestine, Jadwiga Harasowska oversaw the large-scale printing of The Trilogy. She edited English-language pamphlets (Polish Underground Army, Tadeusz Kościuszko, Wilno–Lwów, Theatre in Poland) as part of the "Polish Library Pamphlet" series, promoting Polish history and culture. In 1944, she published an anthology of clandestine Polish poetry from occupied Warsaw in English. She also released collections of Polish poetry, albums of Polish music, and translations of patriotic and folk songs. In 1945, she published the two-volume work Straty Kultury Polskiej, 1939–1944, a significant contribution to Polish history. This project had been initiated by an underground commission of rectors from Warsaw universities as early as late 1939.

Jadwiga Harasowska corresponded with British intellectuals and engaged with the British government on matters concerning Poland. Following the 1943 Gibraltar Liberator AL523 crash, which claimed the life of General Władysław Sikorski, she communicated with the British Foreign Office. She also published an English-language pamphlet by H. W. Henderson on Adolf Hitler's culpability, which later became available in the archives of the Hoover Institution.

=== Post-war period ===
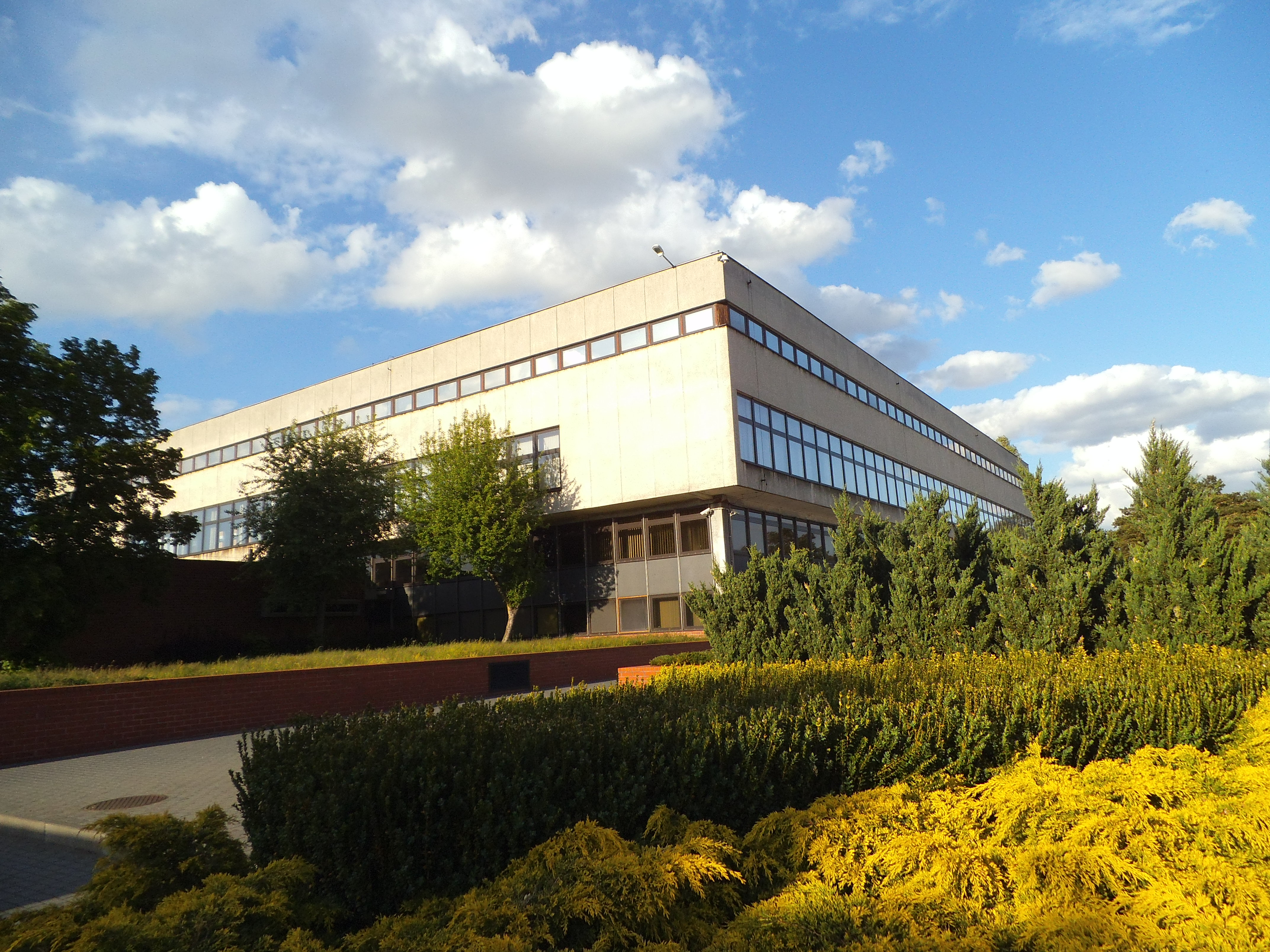
Nicolaus Copernicus University library in Toruń – repository of the Jadwiga and Adam Harasowski archive

After the British government ceased recognition of the Polish government in London in July 1945, Jadwiga and her husband were forced to repay part of the debts for the publications previously ordered by the Polish government. After 1948, Książnica Polska was taken over by the London-based Alma Book Company, which operated until 1953. Following their departure from Scotland, Jadwiga Harasowska initially lived near Lincoln and, from 1966 until her death, resided in Balderton, a district of Newark-on-Trent in Nottinghamshire.

After her death, Adam remarried in 1980 to Joyce Meldrum (Joyce Meldrum-Harasowska), who, following his death in 1996, donated the archives of Jadwiga and Adam Harasowski to the Emigration Archive at Nicolaus Copernicus University in Toruń. A historian of wartime and post-war Polish-Scottish-English relations noted that "Jadwiga Zbrożkówna and Adam Harasowski certainly deserve a separate monograph".

Jadwiga Harasowska's relatives included the philologist Marian Plezia and the Dominican Father Jan Góra.
