= John Stewart (Glasgow politician) =

Scottish politician

Sir John Stewart (1867 – 29 May 1947) was a Scottish politician who served as the first Labour Lord Provost of Glasgow.

Born in Perth in 1867, Stewart moved to Glasgow as a child. He completed an apprenticeship as a brushmaker, and developed an interest in socialism, through the influence of Keir Hardie. He was the first socialist elected to Govan Parish Council.

Stewart was elected as one of the first Labour Party members of the Glasgow Corporation, representing Hutchesontown ward from 1901. From 1935 until 1938, he was the first Labour Party Lord Provost of Glasgow.

Civic offices
Preceded by Alexander B. Swan	Lord Provost of Glasgow; 1935–1938	Succeeded by Patrick Dollan
