= Patrick Dollan =

Scottish politician, activist and writer (1885–1963)

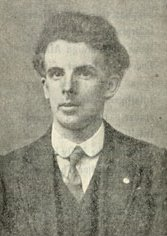
Patrick Dollan

Sir Patrick Joseph Dollan (3 April 1885 – 30 January 1963) and his wife, Agnes, Lady Dollan (née Moir; 16 August 1887 – 16 July 1966) were Glasgow activists in the Scottish Independent Labour Party. During the First World War they campaigned against the Munitions of War Act 1915 which suspended trade unionists' rights for the duration of hostilities.

== Early years ==
Born in Baillieston, Lanarkshire on 3 April 1885 of Irish descent and raised Roman Catholic, Dollan attended St Bridget's elementary school until he was ten years old. He later joined his father working as a miner at Clydeside Colliery in 1900. He married Agnes Moir, a Protestant, in 1912. She was a suffragette and a staunch pacifist during World War I.

== Activism ==
Dollan was first elected to public office in 1920 in the municipal elections of that year as one of three members for the Govan Ward. All three represented the Labour Party. The highest number of votes were gained by Thomas Henderson with 6060; second was Dollan with 5900, and third James N Docherty with 5685.

Patrick and Agnes Dollan were vocal in raising awareness of the plight of thousands of Glasgow tenants who were having their rents raised at a time when military conscription had reduced their earning potential. Government concern at the volatile situation in the city led to the Rent Restrictions Act of November 1915, freezing rents at pre-war levels. In the 1920s he was the author of a booklet, The Clyde Rent War!, a narrative of the Glasgow rent strikes of 1915–16, which also contained proposals for housing policy reform.

Along with Helen Crawfurd and John Maclean, Dollan was a speaker at a Glasgow Unemployment Committee demonstration in the City Hall in January 1921. According to The Scotsman newspaper, "resolutions were passed". Dollan was election organiser for the Independent Labour Party (ILP) in the 1922 United Kingdom general election and then the chairman of the Scottish section of the ILP from 1922 until 1932, when he was expelled and formed his own Scottish Socialist Party, which immediately affiliated to the Labour Party.

Dollan served as Lord Provost of Glasgow from 1938 to 1941.

In 1939 he won the inaugural St Mungo Prize, which is awarded triannually to the person deemed to have done the most to promote and improve the city of Glasgow in the previous three years. He dedicated the prize to his mother. . Also in 1939, Dollan made a sixteen day visit to New York on a fact-finding mission, during which he met New York Mayor Fiorello La Guardia, with whom he became friends. Dollan, his wife (Agnes Dollan) and the other members of the delegation from Glasgow stayed at the Waldorf-Astoria Hotel. During his stay, Dollan visited the World's Fair and discussed matters such as planning and housing with local officials.

At the beginning of World War II, Dollan encouraged his fellow Glaswegians to support the war effort against fascism, for which efforts he was knighted in 1941. In 1940, he was a co-founder and co-chairman (with Jadwiga Harasowska) of the Scottish-Polish Society promoting friendship between the Scottish population and the Polish Army stationing in Scotland at that time.

Keenly interested in town planning, he was a member of the council of the Town and Country Planning Association and of the executive of the Scottish Section. He was the Chairman of the East Kilbride Development Corporation, crucial in bringing industry to that new town. Renowned Scottish planner, Elizabeth Buchanan Mitchell, spoke about him fondly: "His work there was unique. It was there that he wrote his name in the social history of the Scottish nation."

== Miscellanea ==
The Dollan Baths in East Kilbride, Scotland's first Olympic-sized swimming pool, is named in his honour.

Dollan died in the Victoria Infirmary, Glasgow, on 30 January 1963. He was buried in Dalbeth cemetery on 1 February.

The Sikorski Club was donated by Sir Patrick Dollan.

== Honours ==
King George V conferred a knighthood on Dollan in the New Year's Honours of 1941 for his work as Lord Provost of Glasgow.

Civic offices
Preceded by John Stewart	Lord Provost of Glasgow; 1938 – 1941	Succeeded by John McLaren Biggar
Party political offices
Preceded by Manny Shinwell	Scottish representative on the National Administrative Council of the Independent Labour Party; 1923–1932	Succeeded by John McGovern
