= Sikorski Club =

Sikorski Club, also known as the Sikorski Polish Club, is a historic Polish club in Glasgow, Scotland. It was founded as the Polish Social and Educational Society in 1954. The building, known as Sikorski House, was donated by Sir Patrick Dollan. It was named in honor of Władysław Sikorski, who served as the Prime Minister of Poland from 1939 to 1943. In 2016, its existence was jeopardized by a lack of funding for a mandatory renovation of its building.
