= Polish General Exhibition =

1929 exhibition event in Poznań, Poland

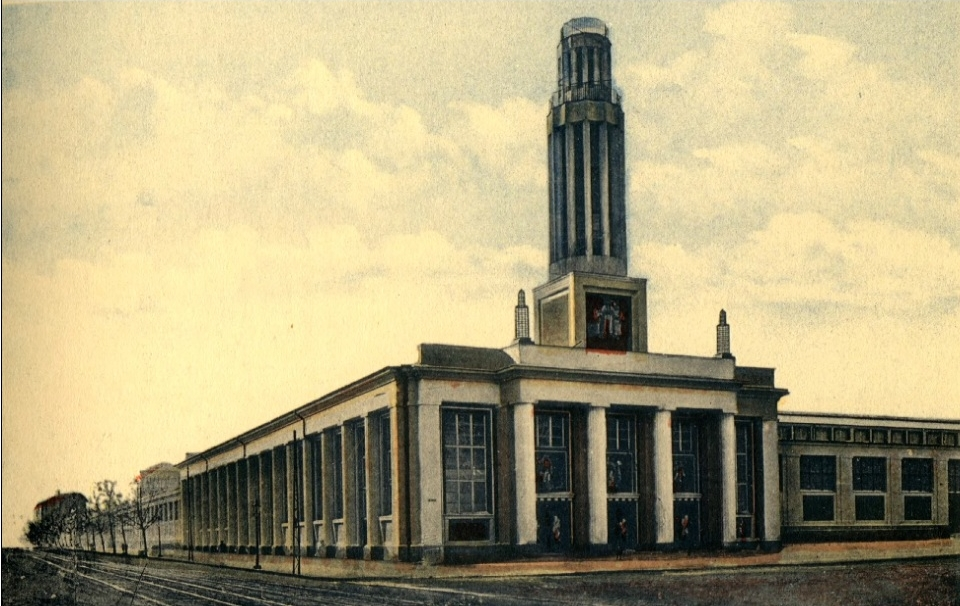
- Representative Hall of the Poznań International Fair
- Date: May 16 – September 30, 1929
- Location: Poznań, Poland

The Polish General Exhibition (Polish: Powszechna Wystawa Krajowa) was an exhibition event held from 16 May to 30 September 1929 (138 days) in Poznań, Poland. It was organized to commemorate the 10th anniversary of regaining independence and to showcase the achievements of the reborn state.

== Preparations ==
The first official mention of the exhibition came from President Cyryl Ratajski on 27 January 1926 during a City Council meeting. At the time, he sought 160,000 PLN to build a modern Automobile Salon as part of the trade fairgrounds. One of Ratajski’s arguments was its potential usefulness for the All-Polish Exhibition planned for 1928. On 17 November 1926, the council approved the idea of organizing the exhibition and granted the Municipal Board authorization for further talks with the government and economic organizations. A similar exhibition was planned for Warsaw’s Skaryszew Park in 1935, but the capital's budget was not prepared for such expenditures. "In Poznań – a city with almost 100% Polish population – the exhibition would be easier to organize, as we already have a substantial complex of trade fair buildings", stated the protocol from a meeting on 2 July 1926 regarding the exhibition’s organization. While Lviv had an exhibition complex, its low economic potential (50% of Poznań’s budget) and predominantly non-Polish population (55% Jewish) posed significant obstacles.

On 6 January 1927, the Minister of Industry and Trade sent Ratajski a decree approving the project for the Polish General Exhibition in Poznań in 1929, responding to a request from 22 November 1926. The first meeting of the Organizing Committee took place on 24 January 1927 at the Town Hall, chaired by Ratajski. The meeting included the provincial governor Adolf Bniński. The committee consisted of the following commissions: Organizational-Legal, Financial, Technical-Construction, and Propaganda.

During President Ignacy Mościcki’s visit to Poznań in February 1927, Ratajski sought presidential patronage for the exhibition. Mościcki agreed, but on the condition that Ratajski would not press for state subsidies for the project. On 1 March 1927, after the opening of the Poznań International Fair, the constitutional meeting of the Society for the Polish General Exhibition in 1929 was held in the Town Hall’s Hall of Renaissance. Attendees included ministers Eugeniusz Kwiatkowski and August Zaleski, as well as Governor Bniński. Despite this, in 1927, Głos Prawdy, associated with the Piłsudski camp, openly opposed organizing the exhibition in Poznań, suggesting Warsaw instead.

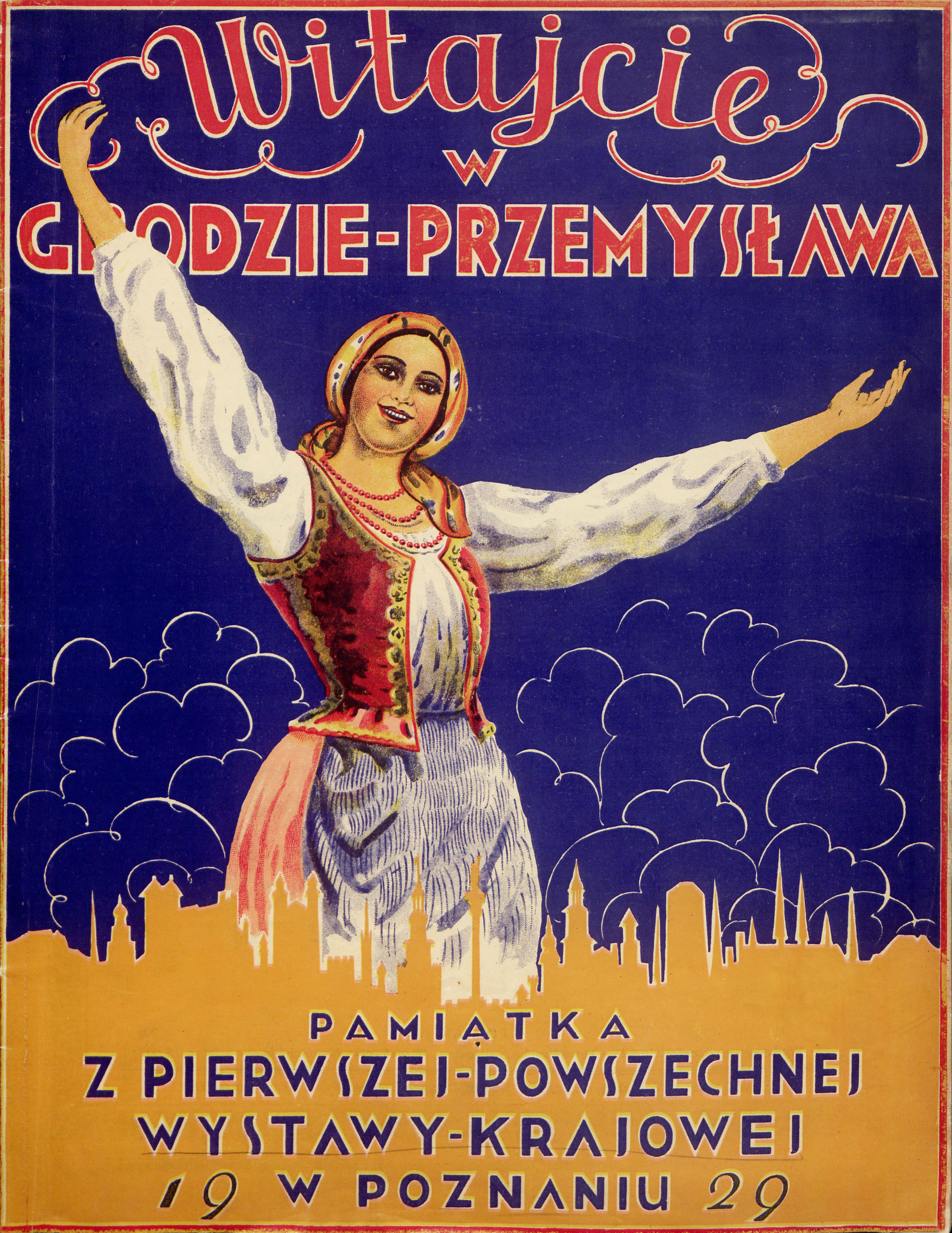
Welcoming pamphlet for visitors to the first Polish General Exhibition in Poznań

As part of preparations for the exhibition, Poznań undertook an extensive modernization of its urban infrastructure. Starting in 1927, projects included the renovation of Szeląg, Dąbrowski Street towards Ławica, Wiosny Ludów Square, Półwiejska Street, and landscaping Marcinkowski Avenue for tramway routes to Wilda. Additional projects involved building underground toilets, removing the hospital fence on Szkolna Street to regulate the street, constructing a municipal house on Grochowe Łąki, an orphanage on Szamarzewski Street, a Chamber of Crafts, the Droga Dębińska Street embankment, a new power plant, a municipal stadium, a pumping station, a waste incinerator at Wilczak, and sewage systems for Górczyn and Łazarz. This "building of Greater Poznań" also inspired the idea of creating "thematic districts". For example, Dębina was to become a sports district, western Jeżyce a horticultural-botanical area, and the vicinity of Szamarzewski Street a District of Municipal Social Welfare. Plans included establishing a regular water transport route to Szczecin, prompting initial works in the inland port. A multi-pavilion Municipal Hospital (spanning 11 hectares) was planned at today’s Waryński Square. On 21 November 1927, a project for the Junikowo Cemetery was finalized.

In 1927, Leon Mikołajczak presented the exhibition’s preliminary budget, totaling 11.5 million PLN. On 20 October 1927, the exhibition’s management board was constituted, including Stanisław Wachowiak (general director), Mieczysław Krzyżankiewicz (general secretary), Leon Szczurkiewicz (administrative director), Leon Mikołajczak (financial director), and Edmund Piechocki (director of industry, communications, and exhibition events). Earlier, a dedicated press organ, Echo of the Polish General Exhibition in 1929, had been established on 12 October 1927.

On 22 October 1927, a competition for the exhibition’s official poster was announced. Wojciech Jastrzębowski won the first prize, while Edmund John took the second prize (both from Warsaw).

== Authorities ==
The leadership of the Polish General Exhibition included: Cyryl Ratajski (President of the Main Council), Stanisław Wachowiak (President of the Board and General Director), Seweryn Samulski (President), Stanisław Rybiński (Counselor), Roger Sławski (Chief Architect), Wiktor Szulczewski (President of the Greater Poland Chamber of Agriculture), Leon Szczurkiewicz (Administrative Director), Waszko, Tadeusz Konopiński (Director of the Agricultural Division), Leon Mikołajczak (Director of the Financial Division), Edmund Piechocki (Director of the Industrial Division), and Jerzy Mueler (Chief Construction Manager).

Ignacy Mościcki assumed patronage over the exhibition, while Józef Piłsudski led the Honorary Committee.

== Character and scale ==
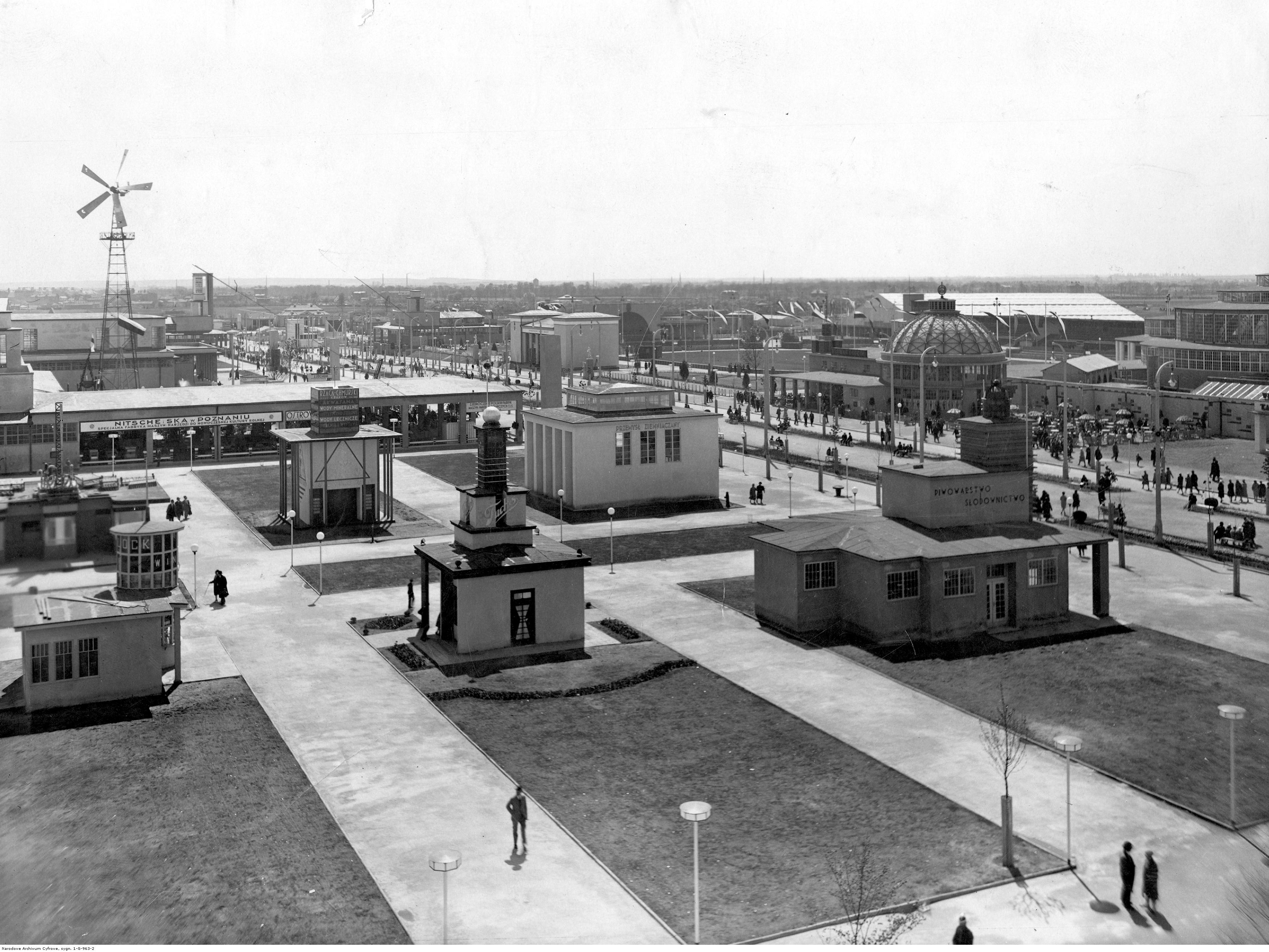
Food industry pavilions

The foundation of the exhibition relied on the infrastructure of the Poznań International Fair, which was suspended in 1929 due to this event. Additionally, numerous new buildings were constructed, including today's Collegium Heliodori, Collegium Anatomicum, Hanka Dormitory, and the largest hotel in Poland at the time – Hotel Polonia (now the Specialist Clinical Hospital of the Medical University). The entire exhibition spanned 65 hectares, divided by existing public streets into five fenced sectors connected by footbridges. The exhibition aimed to showcase the full spectrum of Polish achievements, including economic, cultural, and organizational.

The exhibition was organized into 32 thematic divisions, with 26 focusing on various economic sectors. The remaining divisions included: General Characteristics of the Country, Science and Education, Art, Hygiene and Social Care, Sports and Tourism, and Emigration. Polish products exclusively were showcased across 111 buildings and open-air spaces (a total of 60 hectares divided into sectors A, B, C, D, and E), except in the Emigration division, where Polish diaspora organizations selected the exhibits. The event featured 1,427 exhibitors.

The exhibition featured a wide range of events, concerts, sports competitions, and services. These included the Pan-Slavic Congress of Singers and the 10th Congress of Cities (Polish Cities Association). Highlights included equestrian competitions, polo matches, a live chess performance, music concerts, and Poland's first dog show. Works from organizations like the Praesens Association of Visual Artists, the Society of Polish Artists Sztuka, and the Cooperative of Artists Ład were presented.

The exhibition marked significant milestones in Polish radio broadcasting, including the first live transmission of a football match. The game featured Warta Poznań against PSV Eindhoven, with Poznań's Ludomir Budziński providing commentary. The match ended in a 5:2 victory. On 23 June 1929, the first international field hockey match involving the Polish national team was held during the exhibition (a 0:4 loss to Czechoslovakia). Additionally, on 15 September 1929, Poland's first rescue demonstrations were organized by national ambulance services, the Polish Red Cross, and the military.

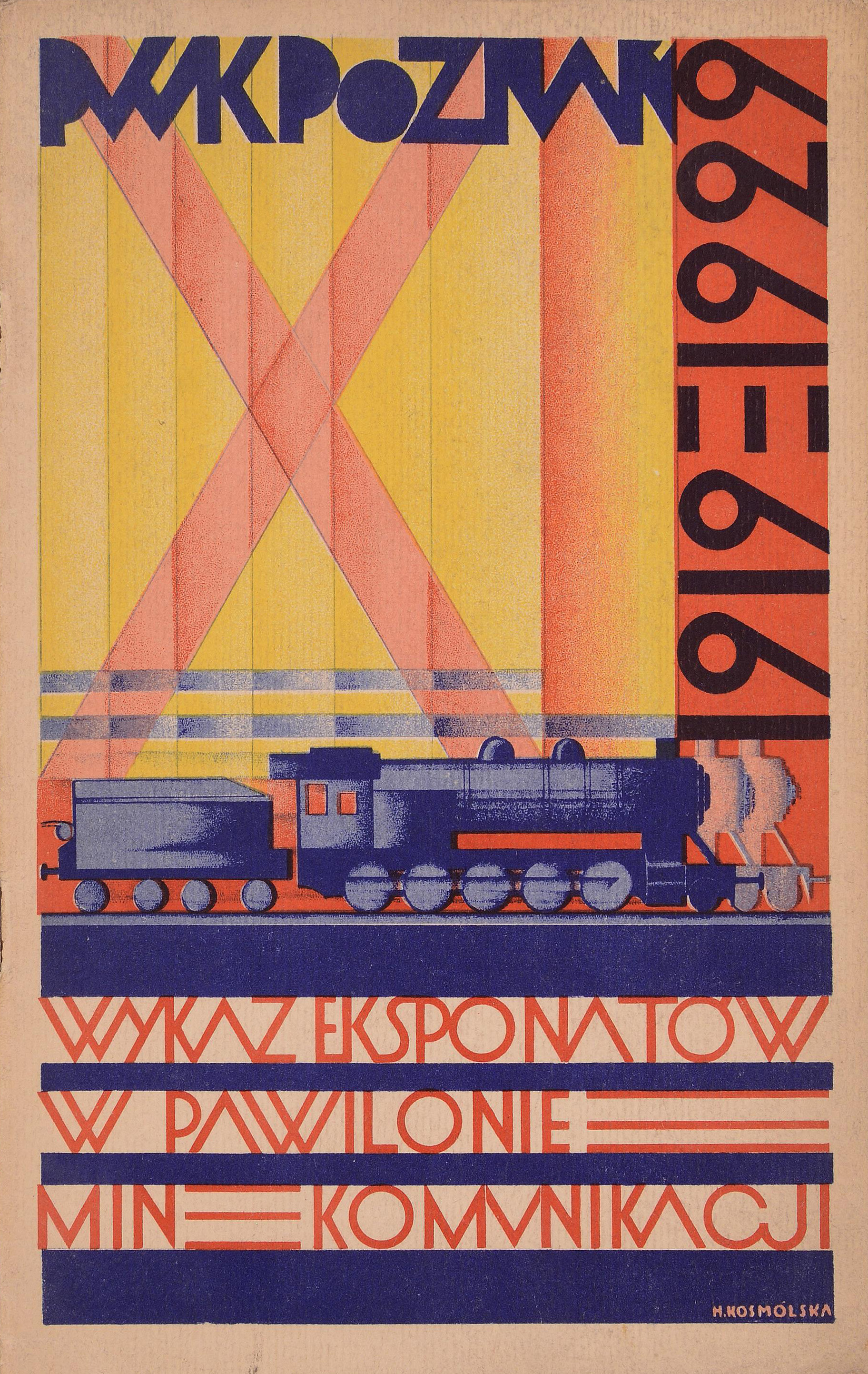
Cover of the catalogue of exhibits in the Ministry of Communications pavilion

Approximately 4.5 million people visited the exhibition over several months, including 200,000 foreign guests (90,000 Germans, 80,000 Czechoslovaks, and 10,000 Polish Americans). Visitors included official delegations with government representatives, as well as nearly 1,000 journalists from 30 countries.

The event featured the largest amusement park in interwar Poland, boasting attractions such as a 20-meter waterfall, a Ferris wheel, one of Europe’s largest roller coasters, and the continent’s largest water slide (92 meters). Research for the park involved visiting similar facilities in Berlin, Copenhagen, Amsterdam, Rotterdam, Brussels, Paris, Milan, and Vienna. Constructed by the Ruprecht company of Munich (holder of exclusive patents for roller coasters) in collaboration with Poznań's Roman Andrzejewski firm, the park offered attractions including a 120-meter roller coaster, water slide, autodrome with 25 scooters, miniature railway with 15 carts, and mechanical animals. The term wesołe miasteczko (amusement park) was used for the first time in Poland, influencing the naming of similar parks in Warsaw.

For internal transportation within the exhibition grounds, 20 battery-powered chassis were purchased from France, based on which the tram workshops on Gajowa Street built small, open omnibuses with a capacity of 10 passengers, but with roof coverings. This eliminated the use of gasoline-powered transport and reduced air pollution within the exhibition area.

The Greater Poland Association for the Promotion of Tourism was established to organize trips to the exhibition.

== Sectors ==
=== Sector A ===
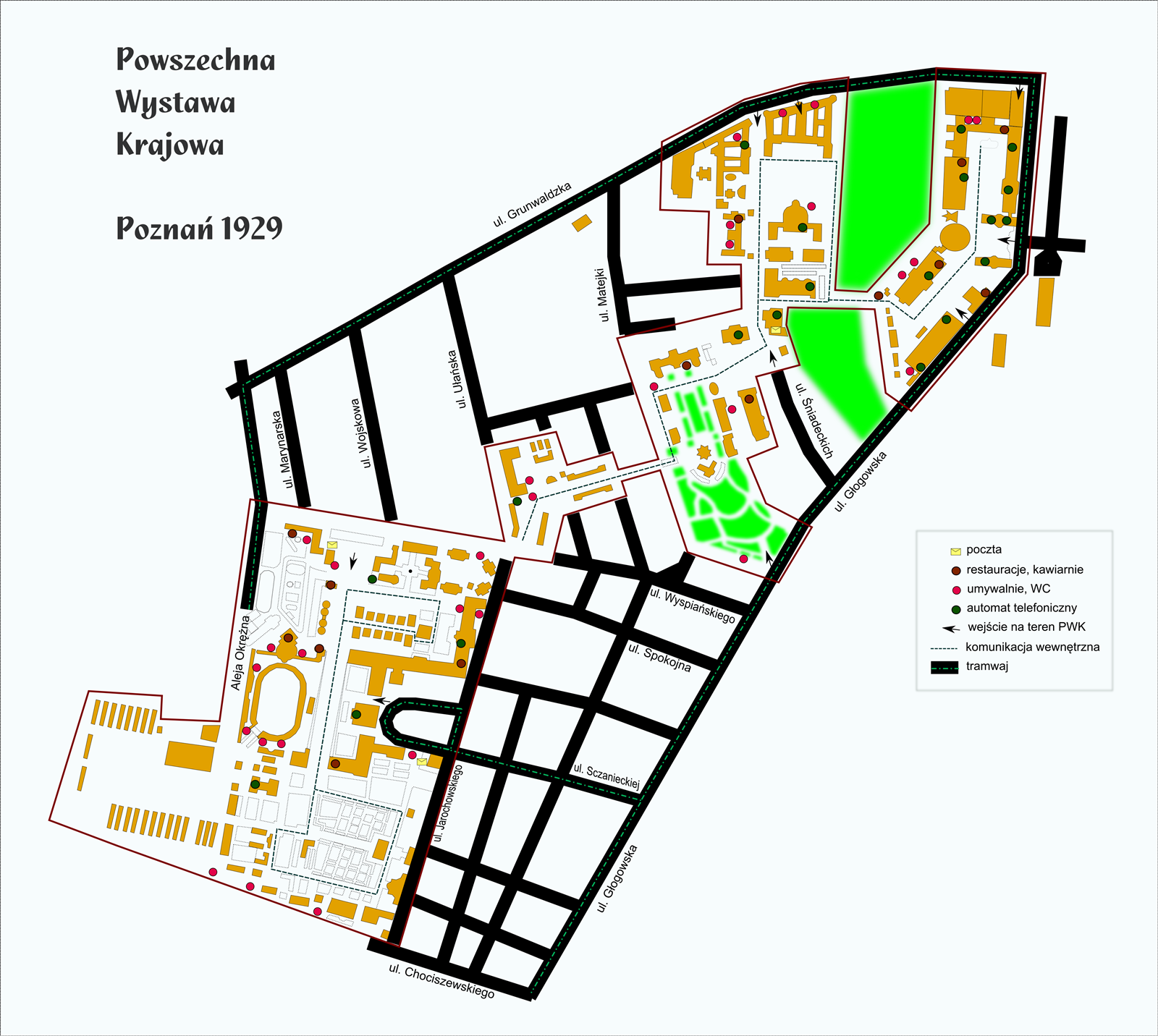
Plan of the exhibition

Area: 62,000 m². This was part of the "old" exhibition grounds from between 1921 and 1925, previously used for Prussian exhibitions, including the 1911 East German Exhibition.

=== Sector B ===
Area: 52,000 m². Partly already developed with university buildings. This area housed several government buildings, including Collegium Chemicum and Collegium Anatomicum (currently located on Grunwaldzka, Śniadeckich, and Święcicki streets).

=== Sector C ===
Area: 86,000 m². This area served as the green lungs of the exhibition – mostly the Wilson Park, which was partially built up previously, such as with the Palm House.

=== Sector D ===
Area: 57,000 m². This sector connected areas A, B, and C with the amusement park area (E). It is now developed along Siemiradzki and Kossak streets, previously known as the Johow-Gelände.

=== Sector E ===
Area: 343,000 m². The largest part of the exhibition grounds, mainly containing attractions that were not strictly part of the exhibition, including recreational areas, the amusement park, and restaurants with dance halls.

== Opinions ==
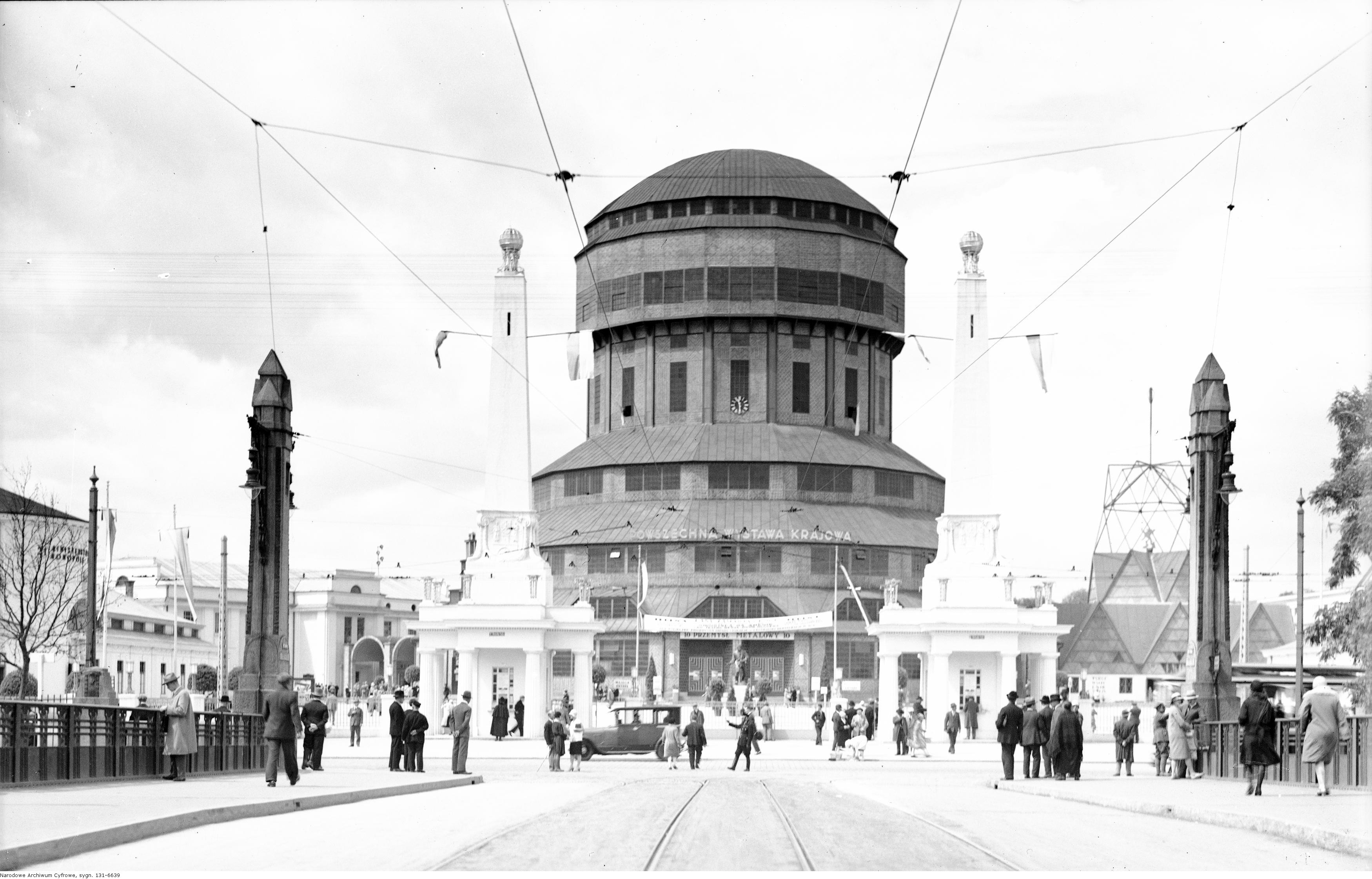
Upper Silesian Tower during the exhibition

Around 60,000 articles about the exhibition and Poland were published in the global press. The largest number (outside Poland) appeared in German-language media. Berliner Tageblatt wrote that the significance of the exhibition should not be underestimated, especially considering the strong representation of the German minority. Danziger Zeitung stated that the exhibition would pave new paths for Polish-German trade and "show what Poland can export". The same newspaper remarked that, in terms of size and organization, it could only be compared to the exhibitions of the British Empire. Ostdeutsche Morgenpost recommended visiting especially the Upper Silesian industry and agricultural sections. While the German press generally showed a hostile attitude toward the exhibition, particularly due to the display of Polish minority persecution in Germany at the Polish Abroad Pavilion (number 36), some voices were supportive. Ernst Feder wrote: "The exhibition gives a varied picture of admirable diligence, enormous growth, and complete consolidation, a picture that the Polish eagle on the main tower of the Exhibition can view with satisfaction".

Specialist press also followed the exhibition closely. In June 1929, fifteen German specialized magazines published significant articles related to their industries. The journalist from Volkswacht called the event "the greatest exhibition of the current century" and added that it "revolutionized the history of exhibitions worldwide. No longer relying on outdated dry exhibition formats, everything is presented in an accessible and light manner for everyone".

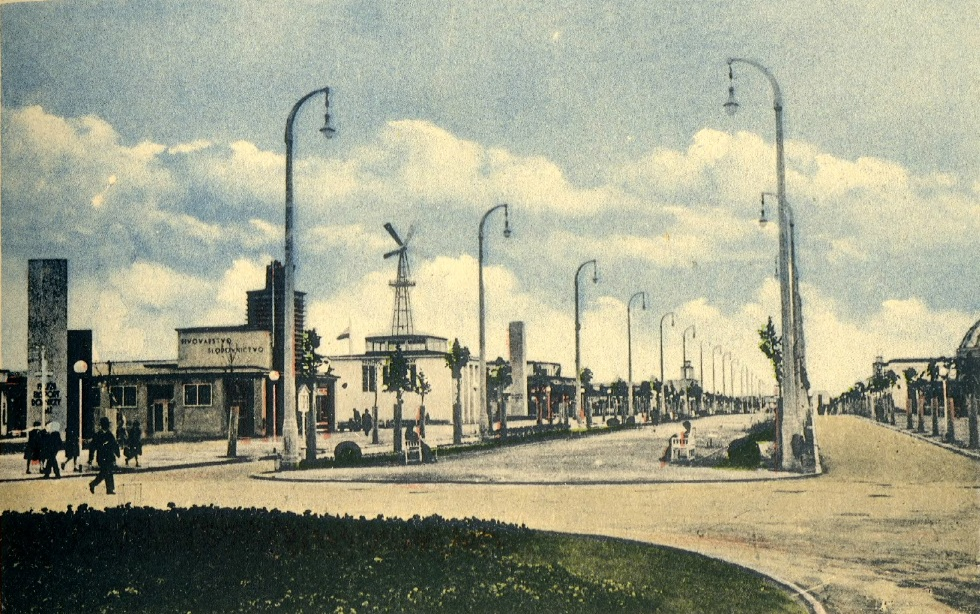
Main avenue of the exhibition

The official organ of the Czechoslovak Ministry of Foreign Affairs, Prager Presse, wrote that the exhibition demonstrated what Poland had achieved in the past decade in organizational matters and that "all this makes a powerful impression".

Branko Lazarewicz (Yugoslavian diplomat) stated: "I was impressed by the constructive abilities of the Poles, who in the last ten years managed such an effort. The American scale reflects Poland's economic strength".

French opinions were especially significant for the Polish press. Le Figaro published an article by Stefan Aubac emphasizing the importance of the Exhibition for confirming Poland’s economic progress. Jean Locquin, a French parliamentarian, stated that exhibition was "a revue of Poland's creative forces from the last ten years". Emanuel Evain, a deputy from Paris, wrote: "Poznań is the definitive resurrection of Poland, the miraculous flourishing of Polish genius, the harbinger of its future development".

The British press published numerous reports on the exhibition starting from the first week of June 1929. Daily Mail wrote that the exhibition "proves what the Poles have achieved through hard work and thrift. The Poles showed at this exhibition that there is nothing they cannot manufacture themselves. This nation is so ingenious that it can make anything it desires". In July 1929, Financial News compared it to the 1924 world's fair, stating that the exhibition "can rightly be called Poland's Wembley. It is all the more admirable because the exhibition in Wembley was subsidized by colonial governments, whereas exhibition arose from private initiative. From this perspective, the Exhibition must evoke sincere admiration as a manifestation of true patriotism".

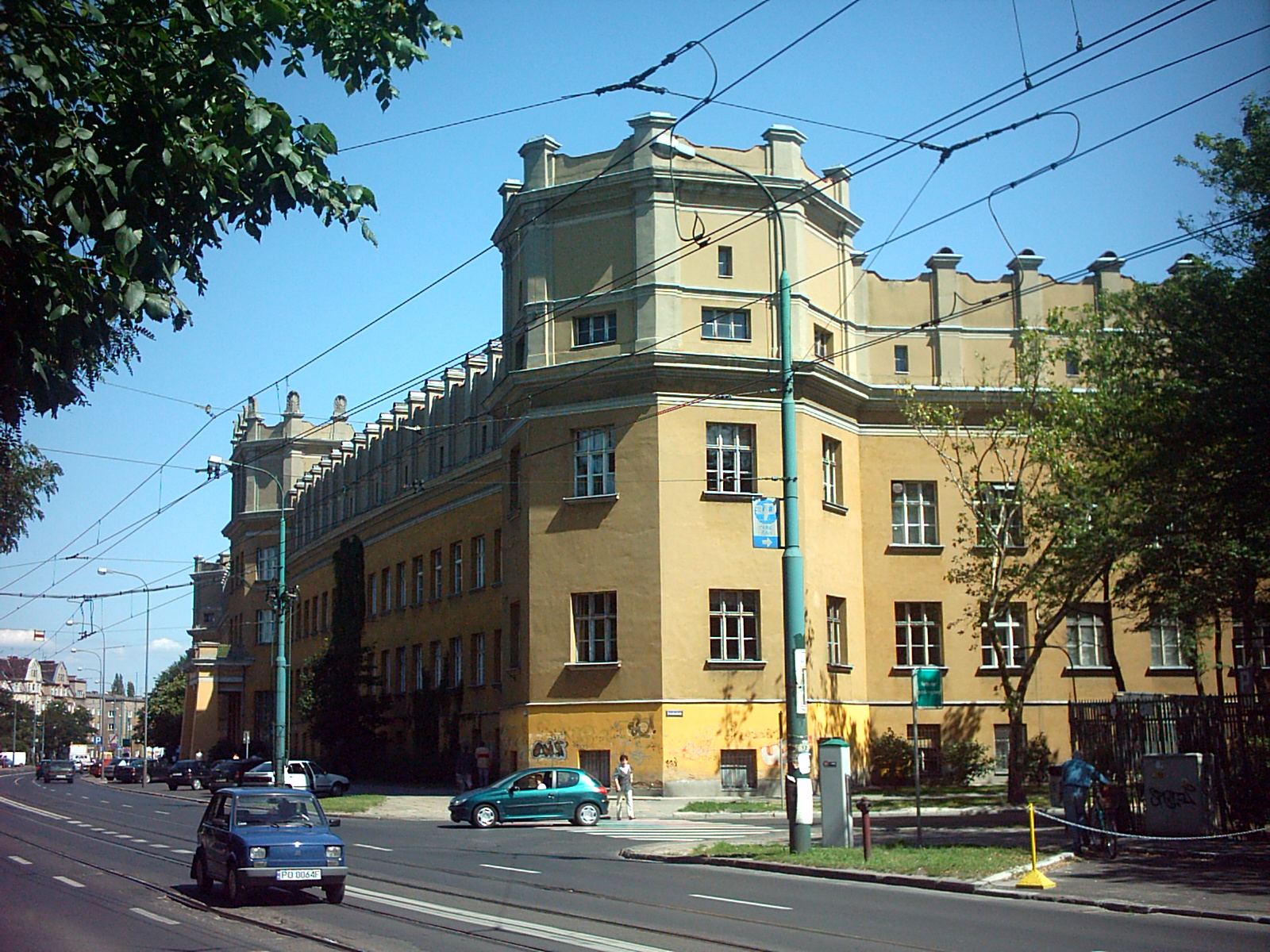
Government Palace, now Collegium Chemicum

The Swedish newspaper Dagens Nyheter wrote: "The exhibition in Poznań is the first Polish exhibition since the country's rebirth and deserves to be visited as it provides a complete view of the fruits of the great nation's labor". The Svenska Dagbladet highlighted the short preparation time for the event, comparing it to the British exhibition in Wembley.

The Austrian Der Österreichische Volkswirt emphasized the immense progress made by the Poles over the last decade, noting that "Poland has managed, in just ten years, to consolidate the country administratively and economically to such an extent that this work is a success that has so far been insufficiently acknowledged". Der Tag referred to the exhibition in one of its articles as "Poland's Wembley".

The opinion of Canadian professor William Caldwell was widely reprinted in Polish and some European newspapers. He wrote:

The comparison with the great British exhibition in Wembley is not exaggerated. [...] At exhibition, there are many things that the English could learn from. The modernity of the Exhibition is particularly striking. The reception of foreign guests in Poznań is extraordinarily well organized. [...] The Exhibition in Poznań is perhaps more beautiful than the Canadian national exhibition in Toronto, surpassing it significantly in size and the number of exhibits. [...] The exhibition of Polish artists, in terms of originality, artistry, and vitality, surpasses all similar exhibitions in Europe that I have visited in the last eleven years.

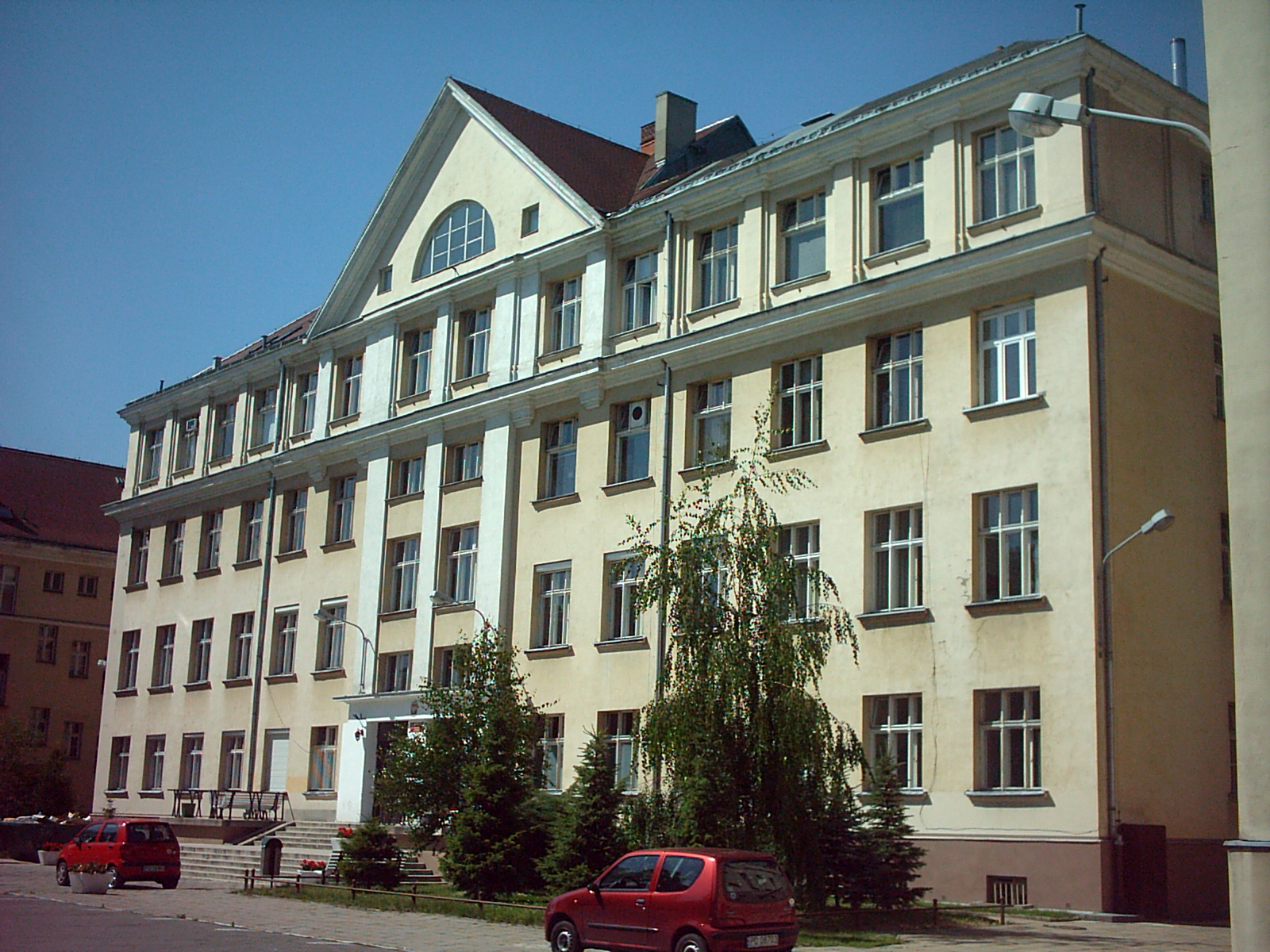
Art Palace, now Collegium Anatomicum

The Italian newspaper Informazione, praising the exhibition, stated that it definitively debunked the myth of Poland as a seasonal country. Impero published an extensive report titled Poznań – The City of Gardens, admiring the city’s development and emphasizing Poland's desire to become independent from foreign industries.

Hans Kloetzli from the Swiss Neue Zürcher Zeitung compared the exhibition to the Spanish, 12-volume work praising the successes of Primo de Rivera’s government, stating that the Spanish work pales in comparison to what the Polish government showed in Poznań.

August Schmidt, a member of the exhibition committee in Antwerp, visited Poznań to prepare for a similar event in his city. He recommended a visit to all Belgians, saying: "If Warsaw is the capital city, then Poznań, after being liberated from German oppression, is the most Polish city".

The Dutch Algemeen Handelsblad noted that while the Poles had modeled their exhibition on the German ones, they had nonetheless achieved a distinctly Polish character for the event, which "evoked sincere admiration".

== Reference to the Polish General Exhibition ==
On 16 May 1989, a ceremonial session was held at the Poznań Provincial Office to mark the 60th anniversary of the opening of the Polish General Exhibition, presided over by the Chairman of the Constitutional Tribunal, Alfons Klafkowski. At that time, plans were made to organize a similar exhibition in 1994. In 1989, initiatives and ideas for this purpose were gathered. The Poznań Panorama organization was established for this purpose under the auspices of PRON (Patriotic Movement for National Rebirth) and the Society for Supporting Economic Initiatives.
