= Pan-Slavic Congress of Singers =

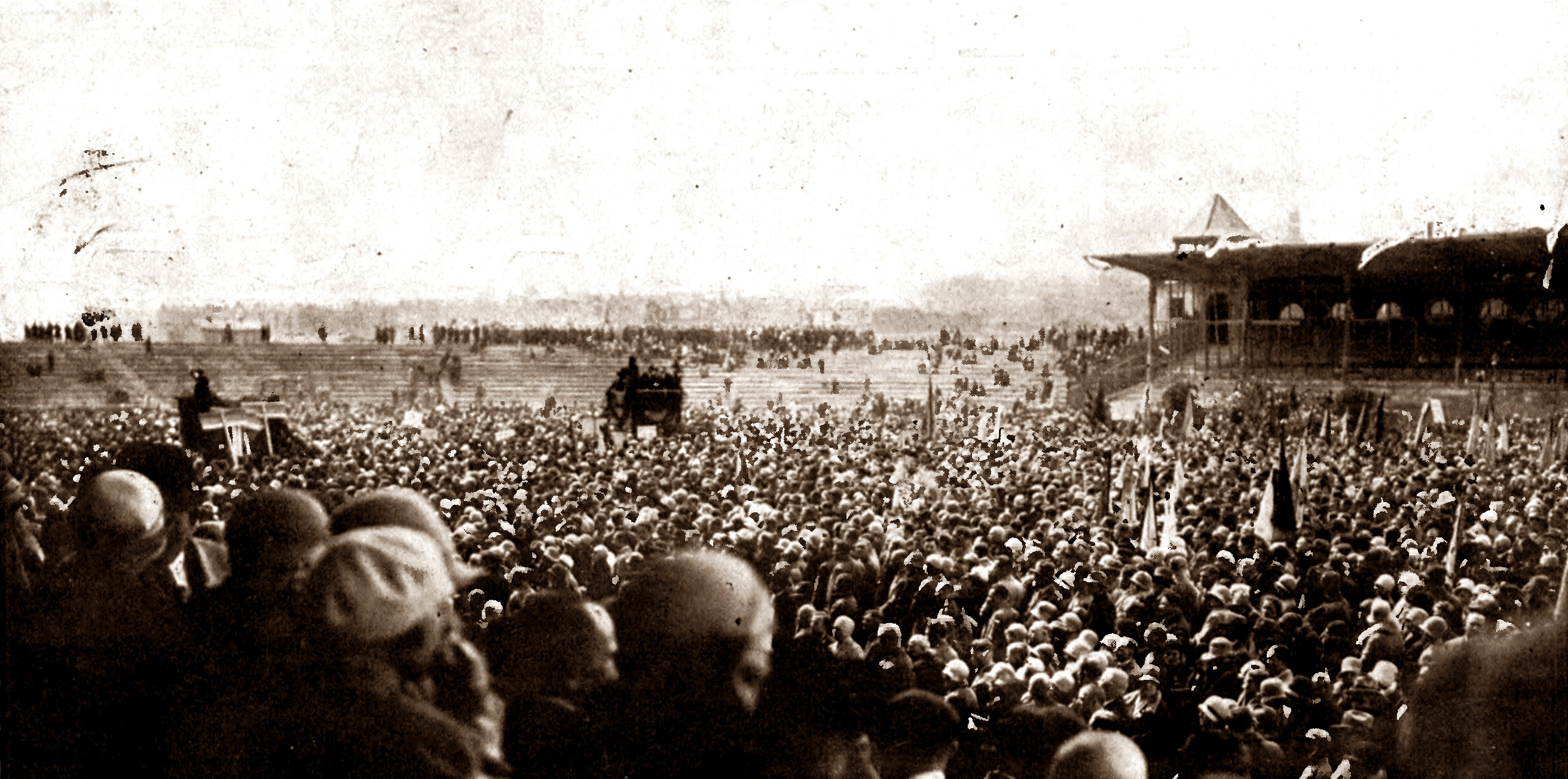
The opening of the congress at the newly built Stadion Edmunda Szyca

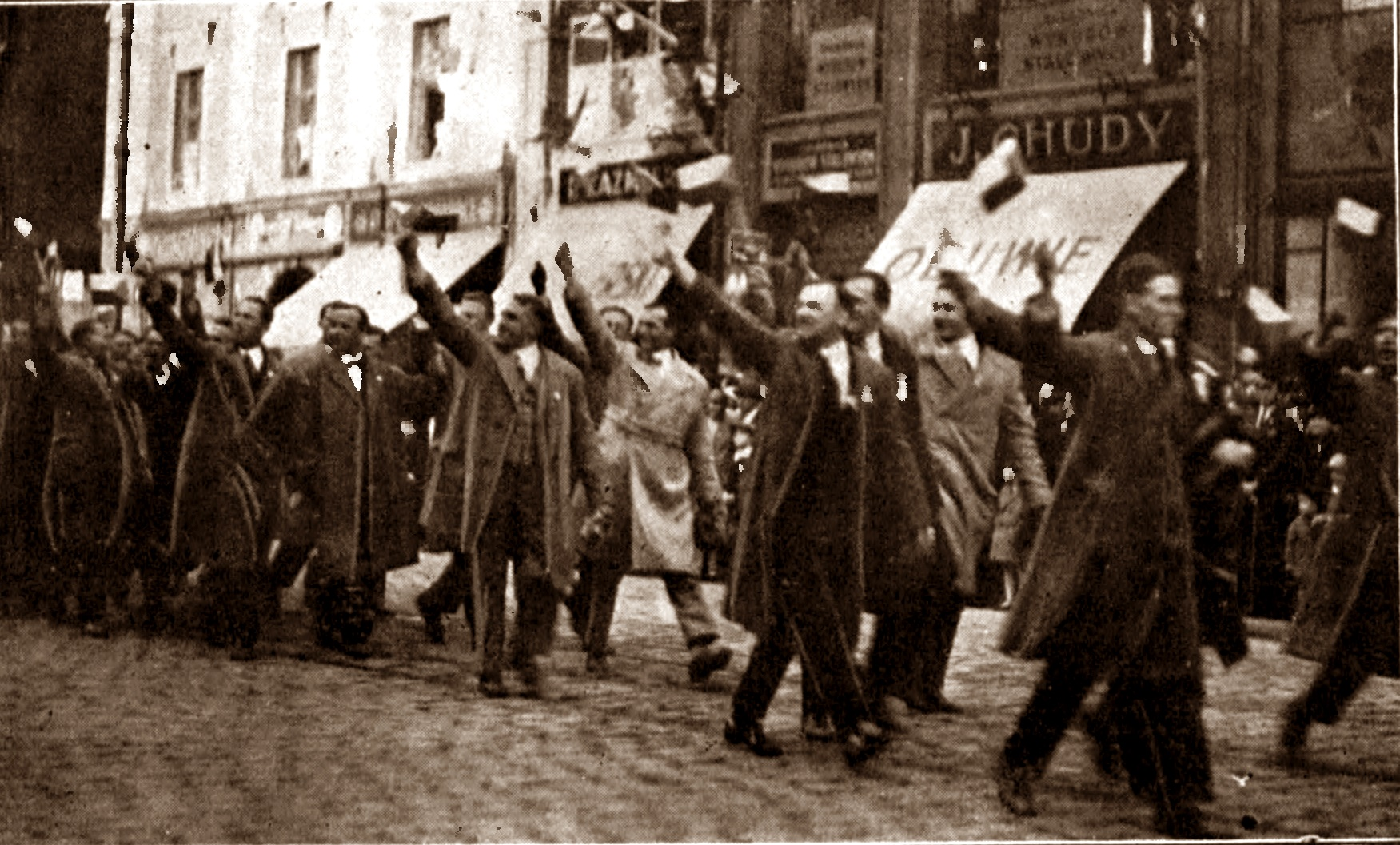
Czechoslovak singers salute the President of Poland, Ignacy Mościcki, during the military parade

The Panslavic Congress of Singers was an international assembly of choirs and associations of singers which took place in Poznań between May 18th and 21st, 1929, during the commencement of the Polish General Exhibition. It was connected with the First Polish Music Festival (May 21st thru 29th of 1929).

The congress was initiated by the Greater Poland’s Singers Association and Slovak Singers’ Union under the conception of non-political binding of the Slavic nations by dint of the culture. Choirs from various regions of Poland and Polish diaspora, groups from Czechoslovakia, Yugoslavia and Bulgaria have participated in it massively. Altogether over 17 000 singers have sung (other sources say about 18 000 or 20 000). 8 thousand men under leadership of professor Władysław Raczkowski sang the hymn Gaude Mater Polonia. The performance of Ojczyzna by Feliks Nowowiejski with his companionship of ten brass bands have caused the peculiar appealing of the audience. The number of people singing at once at the day of the opening is approximated to 12 000 or 13 000.

The souvenir after the Congress was the first Slavic Linden which was supposed to symbolise the unity and fraternity of the Slavic nations. It was planted by the participants on 21 May 1929 at 7 p.m. It was known to be located near the nearby opera, which now exists as the Henryk Wieniawski Park; other sources say about Adam Mickiewicz Park. It was surrounded by 4 masts and every each had the banner of Czechoslovakia, Bulgaria, Yugoslavia and Poland. It was intended to ultimately place it in the planned Slavic park. Around the linden, on the rails, there was a Polish inscription:

Lipa słowiańska

zasadzona na pamiątkę I wszechsłowiańskiego
zjazdu śpiewaczego

w dniach 18.5.–22.5.1929

Which translates to

Slavic linden

planted in memory of the first panslavic
congress of singers

May 18-22 1929

The tree was cut down by the Nazis.
