= Bolesław Wallek-Walewski =

Polish composer, conductor and educator (1885–1944)

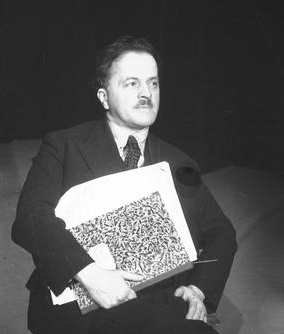
Bolesław Wallek-Walewski.

Bolesław Wallek-Walewski (born 23 January 1885 in Lviv, died 9 April 1944 in Kraków) was a Polish composer and conductor, lecturer and Director of the Conservatory of Music in Kraków.

From 1894 Bolesław Wallek-Walewski studied at the Galician Music Society Conservatory in L'vov under guidance of theory professor Stanislaw Niewiadomski, from 1900 to 1904 under Władysław Żeleński and Felicjan Szopski at the Conservatory of the Music Society in Kraków, and then between 1906 and 1907 with Hugo Riemann in Leipzig. From 1908 he became professor at the Conservatory in Kraków Institute of Music and from 1910 at the Conservatory in Kraków.
