= Towarowa 39 =

Residential high-rise building in Poznań, Poland

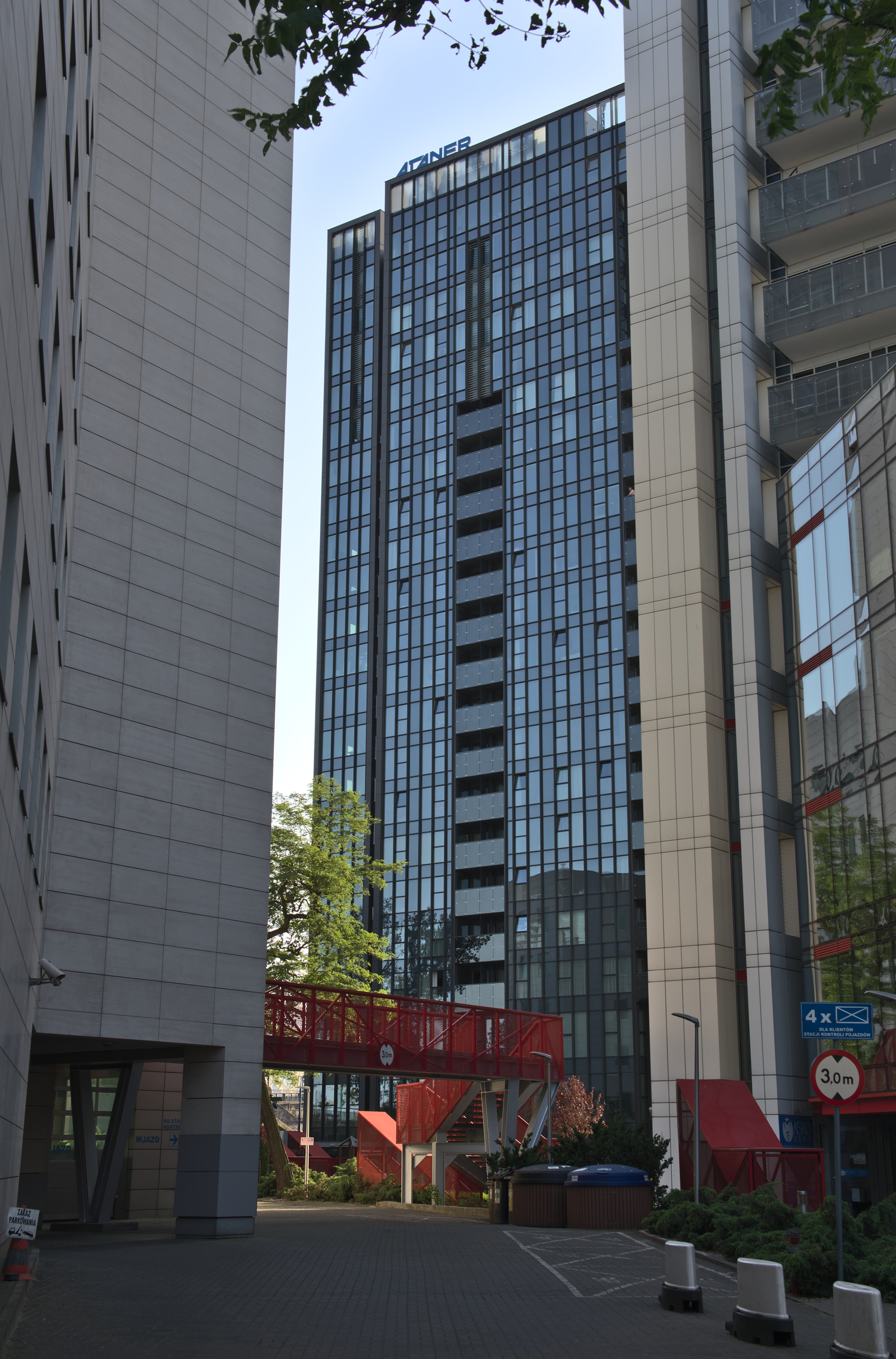
- Interactive map of the Towarowa 39 area

General information
- Status: Completed
- Type: Residential
- Location: Poznań, Poland, 39 Towarowa Street
- Coordinates: 52°24′12.6″N 16°54′52.4″E
- Construction started: January 2017
- Completed: September 2020

Height
- Architectural: 73 m (240 ft)
- Roof: 73 m (240 ft)

Technical details
- Floor count: 22

Design and construction
- Developer: Ataner

Towarowa 39, also known as Delta 4, is a residential high-rise building in Poznań, Poland, and is the fourth tallest building in Poznań.

== Description ==
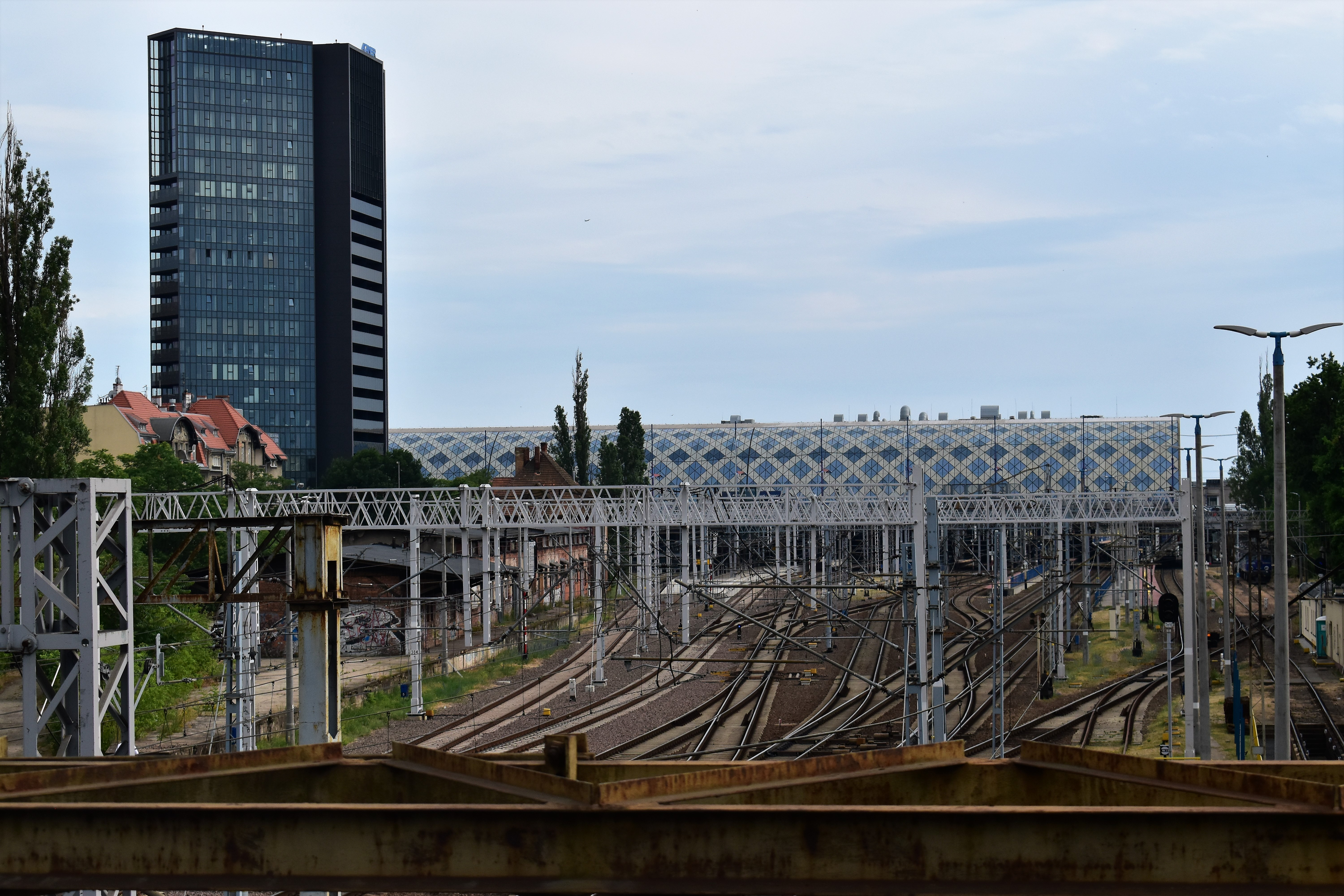
Towarowa 39 (left) and Poznań Główny (right) as seen from Kaponiera Roundabout

The building stands at 73 metres (240 feet) tall, making it the tallest residential building in the city. It has 22 floors above ground intended for residential use and feature 180 apartments. It also has 2 floors below ground used for underground parking containing 230 parking spaces. The roof carries a terrace available only to the place's residents.

The tower is located in the Centrum district of Poznań in close proximity to Poznań Główny railway station, Old Town, Stary Browar and more. The tower is in the area of other residential, office and mixed-use buildings.

== Construction ==
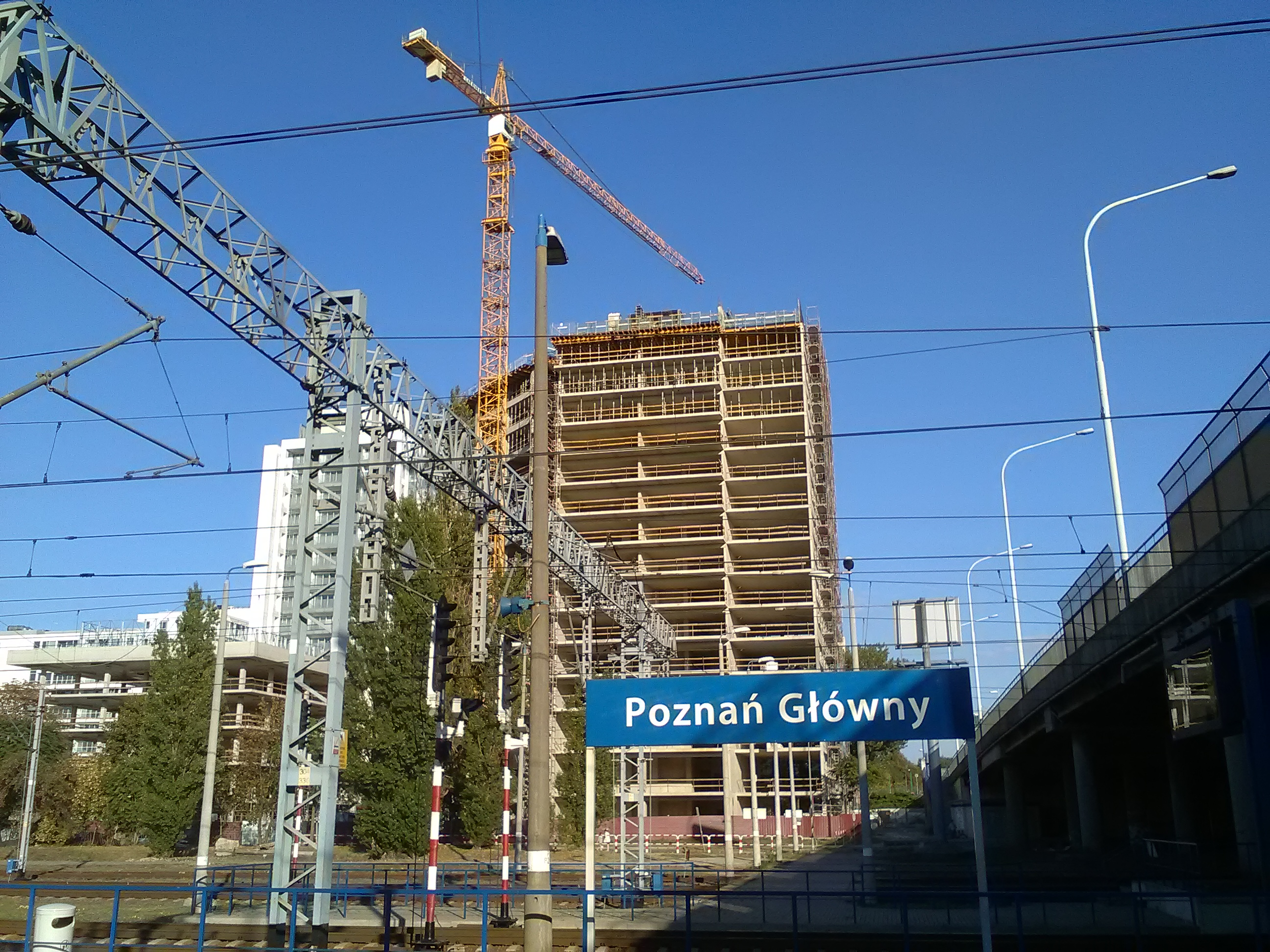
Towarowa 39 under construction as seen from Poznań Główny

Pracownia Architektoniczna Ewy i Stanisława Sipińskich (English: Architectural Studio of Ewa and Stanisław Sipiński) are responsible for the design of the tower. Construction of the building was conducted by Ataner, a Polish real estate development company based in Poznań. It started in January 2017 shortly before the completion of Delta 3, a neighbouring high-rise building. Construction lasted 3 years and ended in September 2020.

== See also ==
- List of tallest buildings in Poznań
