= Bałtyk =

Office building in Poznań, Poland

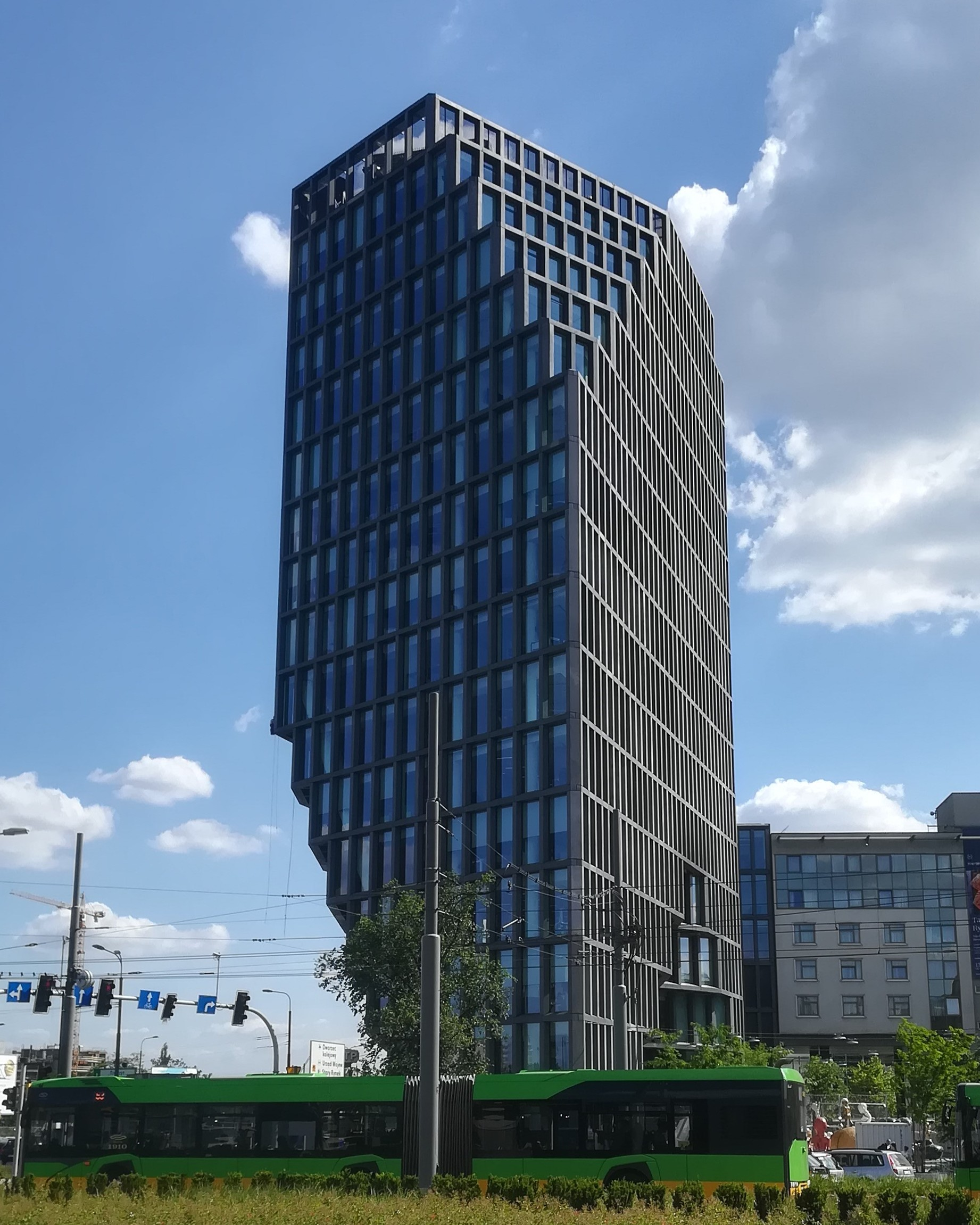
- Bałtyk seen from the north (2018)
- Interactive map of the Bałtyk area

General information
- Status: Completed
- Location: 22 Roosevelta Street
- Coordinates: 52.407108°N 16.911650°E
- Construction started: November 26, 2014
- Completed: May 2017
- Opening: June 2, 2017
- Cost: 150,000,000 PLN

Height
- Architectural: 67 m (220 ft)

Technical details
- Floor count: 17 above ground 3 below ground
- Floor area: 25,000 m^{2} (270,000 sq ft)

Design and construction
- Architect: MVRDV
- Developer: Garvest Real Estate

Bałtyk is a high-rise office building located in the Jeżyce area of Poznań, Poland, designed by the Rotterdam-based MVRDV architectural studio.

== Description ==
The building stands at 67 metres (220 ft) tall. It is the sixth tallest building in Poznań. The high-rise features setbacks and protruding window frames, which cause it to look different from every angle. Its design was inspired by the Pushed Slab office block in Paris, France, the DNB Bank Headquarters in Oslo, Norway, and Okrąglak in Poznań.

== History ==
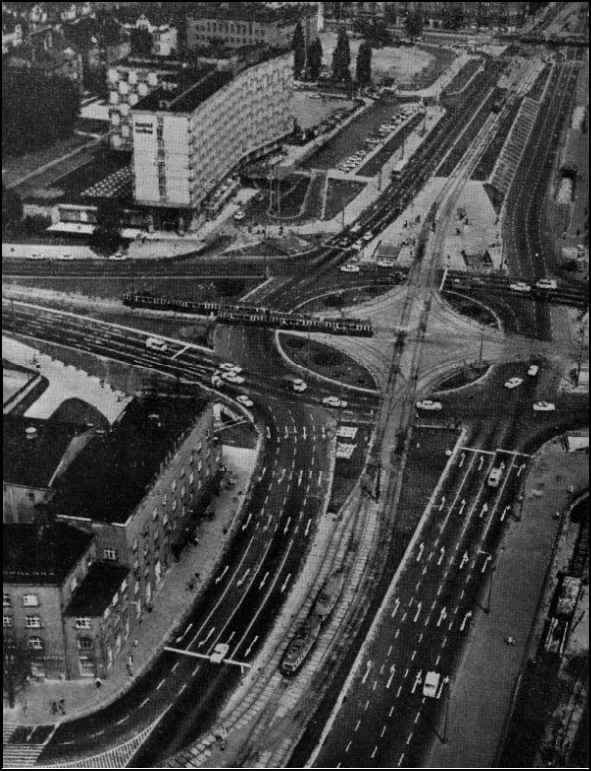
Kino Bałtyk in 1973 (left down corner)

The place where the building now stands was previously occupied by a cinema, Kino Bałtyk, from which the high-rise takes its name. It functioned since 1929 until 2002 and was later demolished in November 2003.

Construction of the high-rise started on the 26th of November, 2014. It lasted 3 years and the building was completed in May 2017, it was opened later that year on the 2nd of June.

Upon its completion, it was the fifth tallest building in Poznań.

== Gallery ==
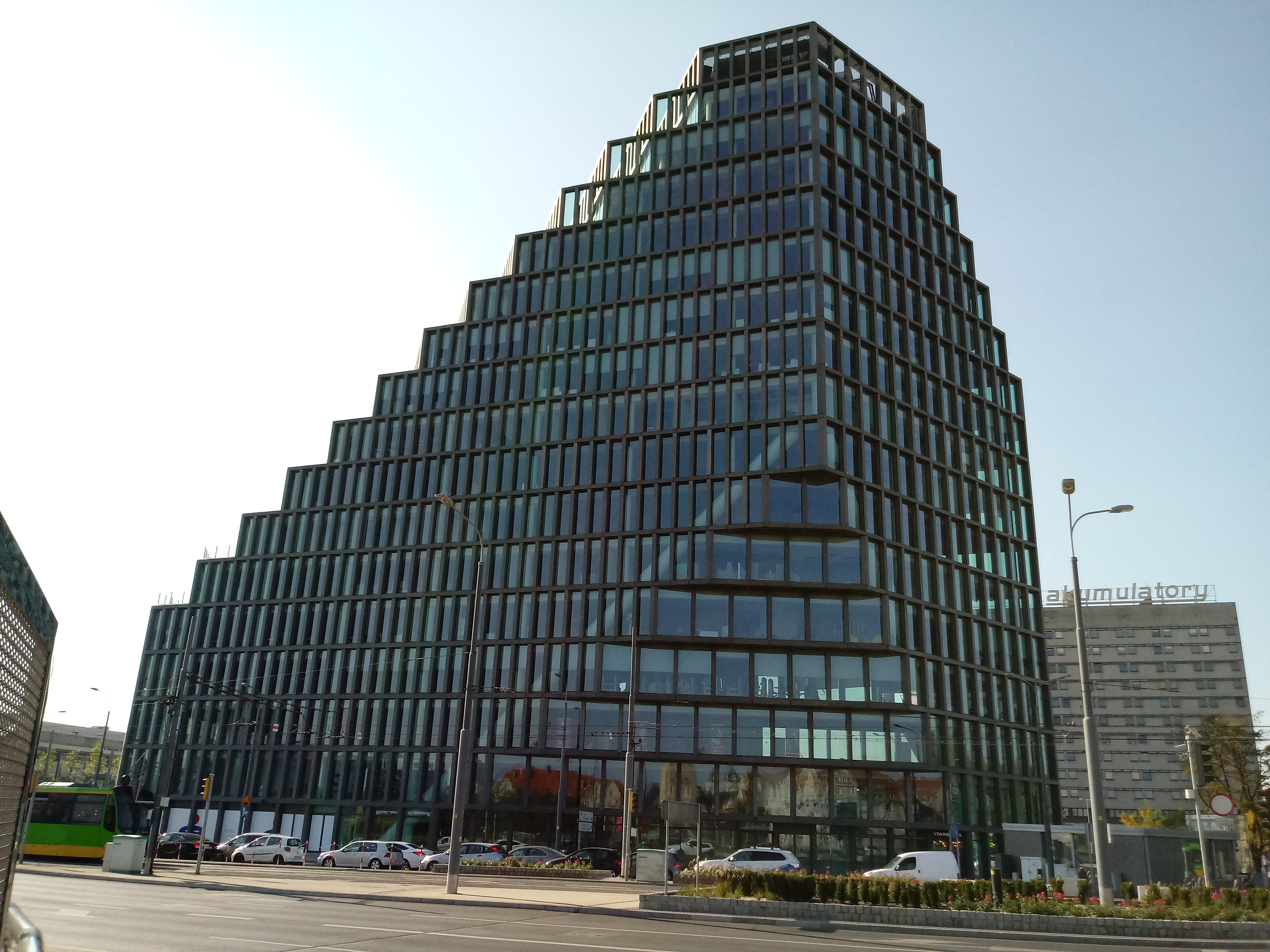
Bałtyk seen from the west

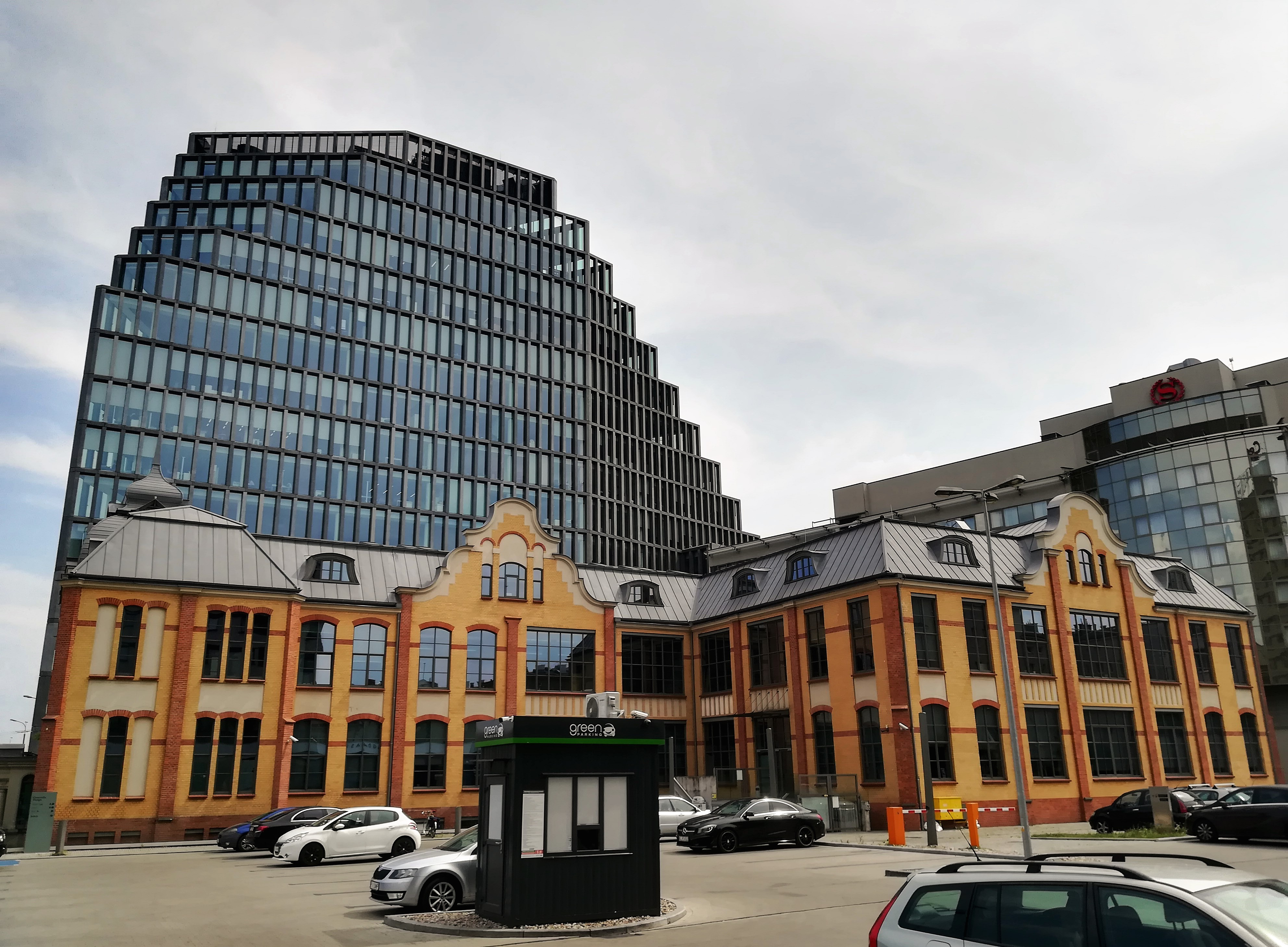
Bałtyk seen from 22 Roosevelt Street

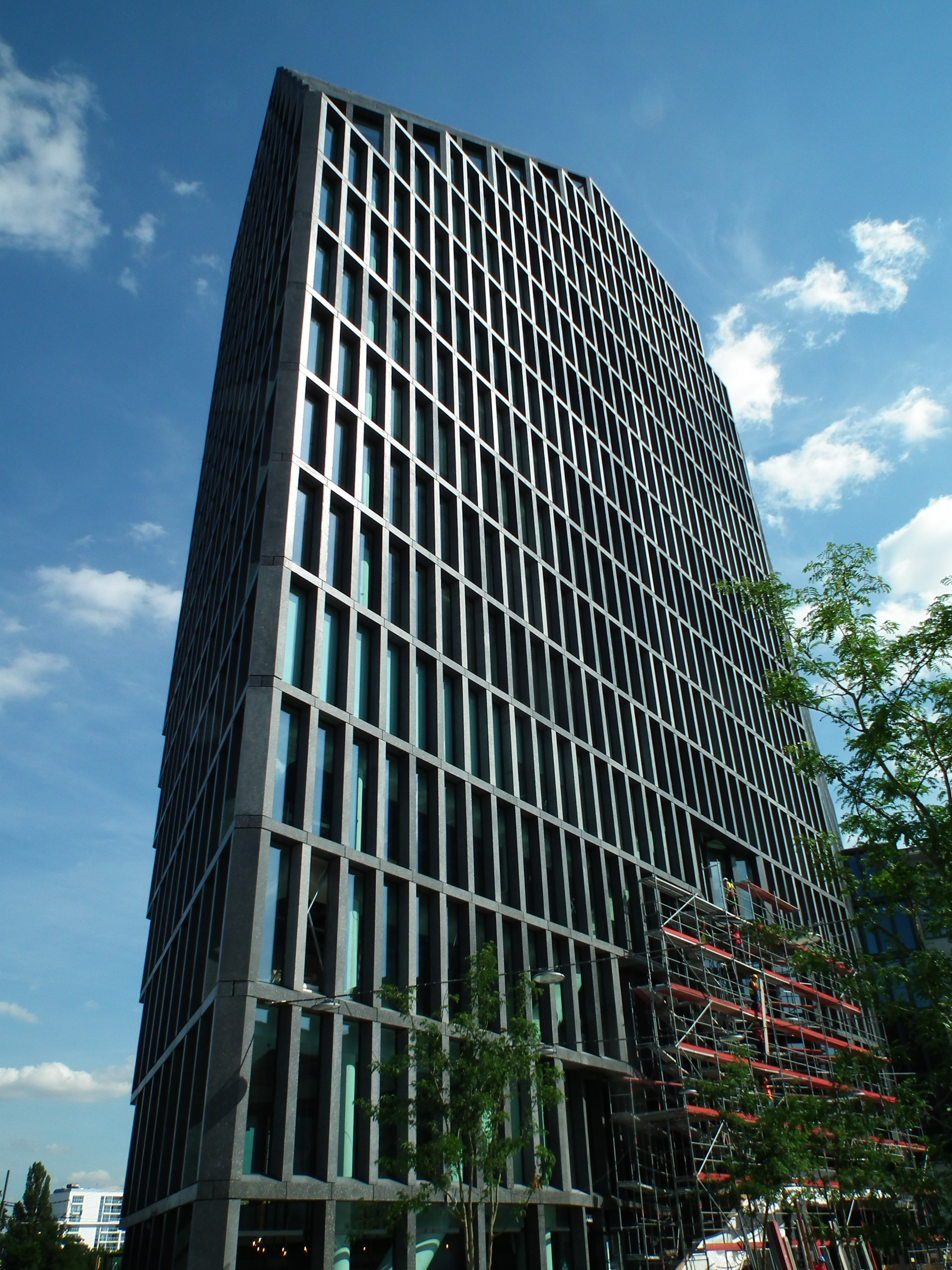
Facade of the building

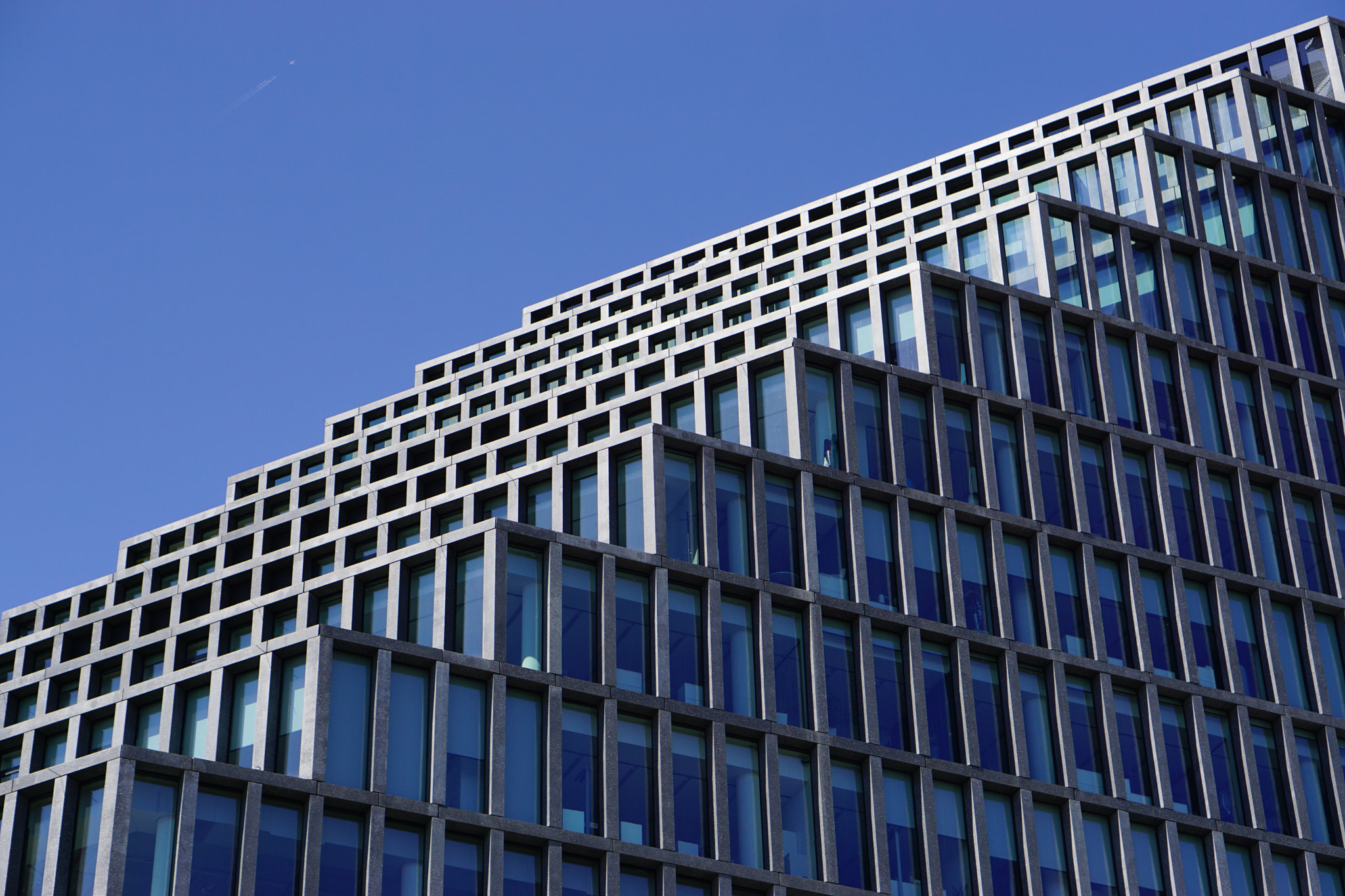
Bałtyk, details

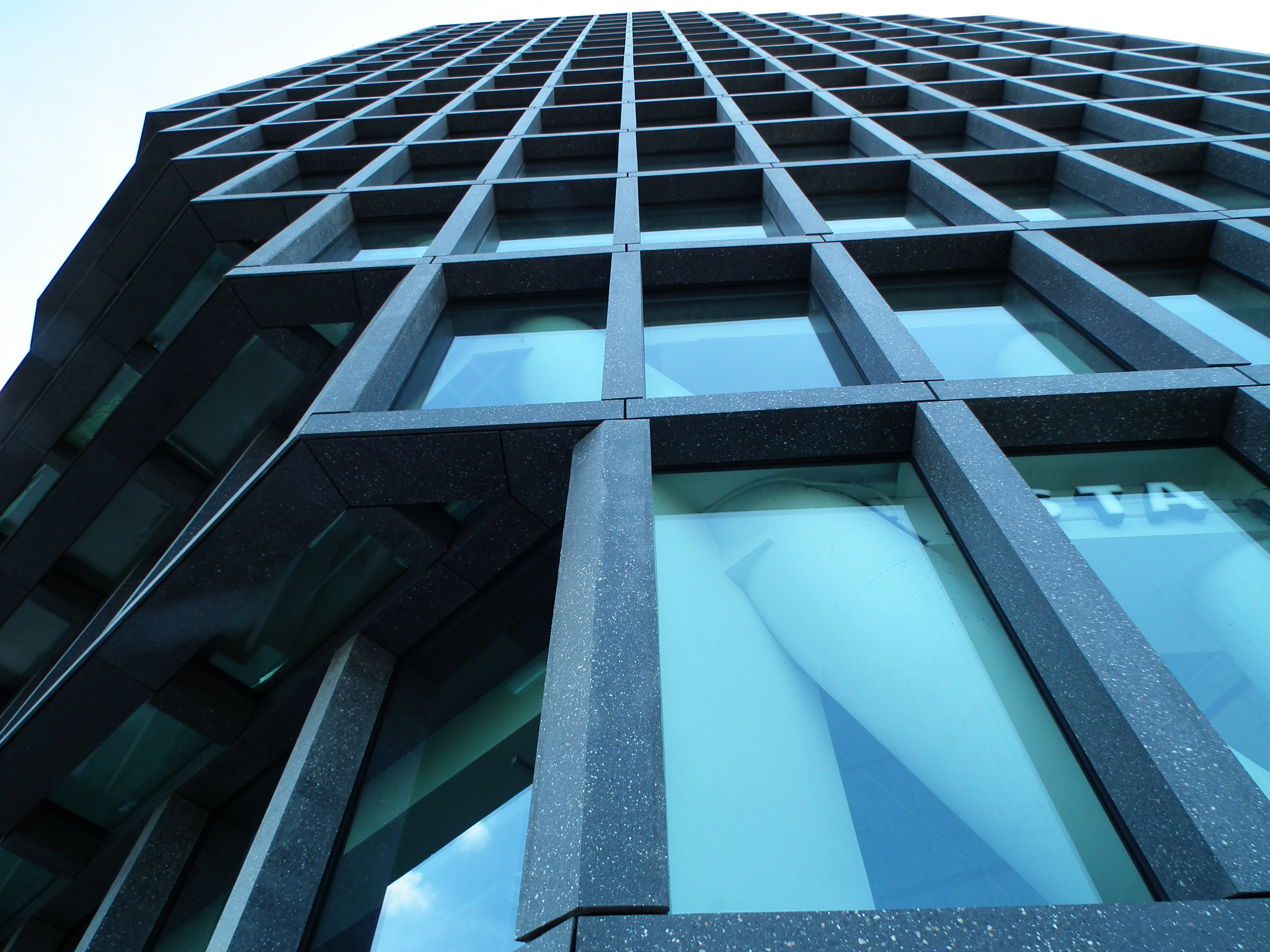
Bałtyk, details

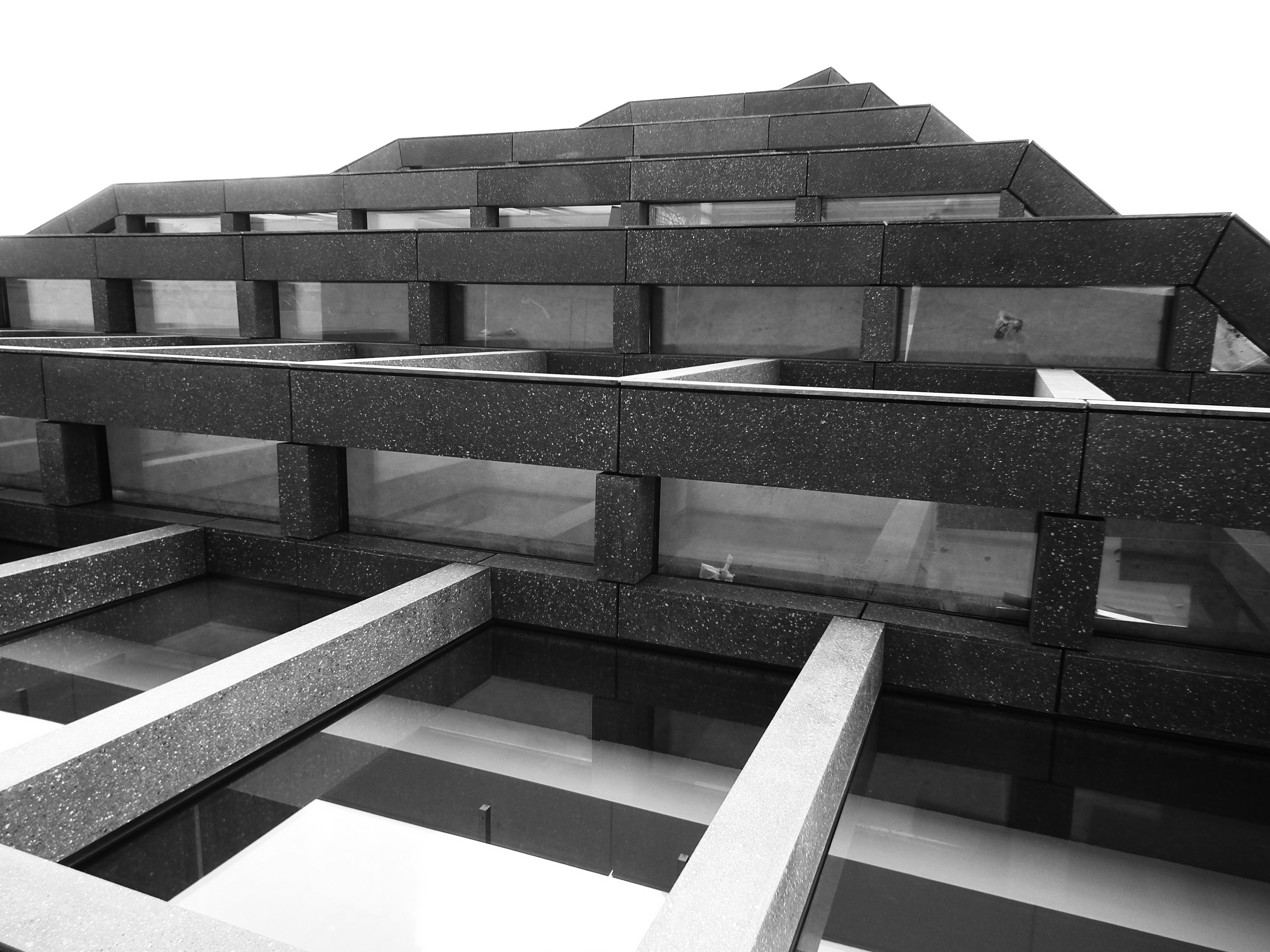
Bałtyk, details

== See also ==
- List of tallest buildings in Poznań
