= Andersia Tower =

Building in Poznań

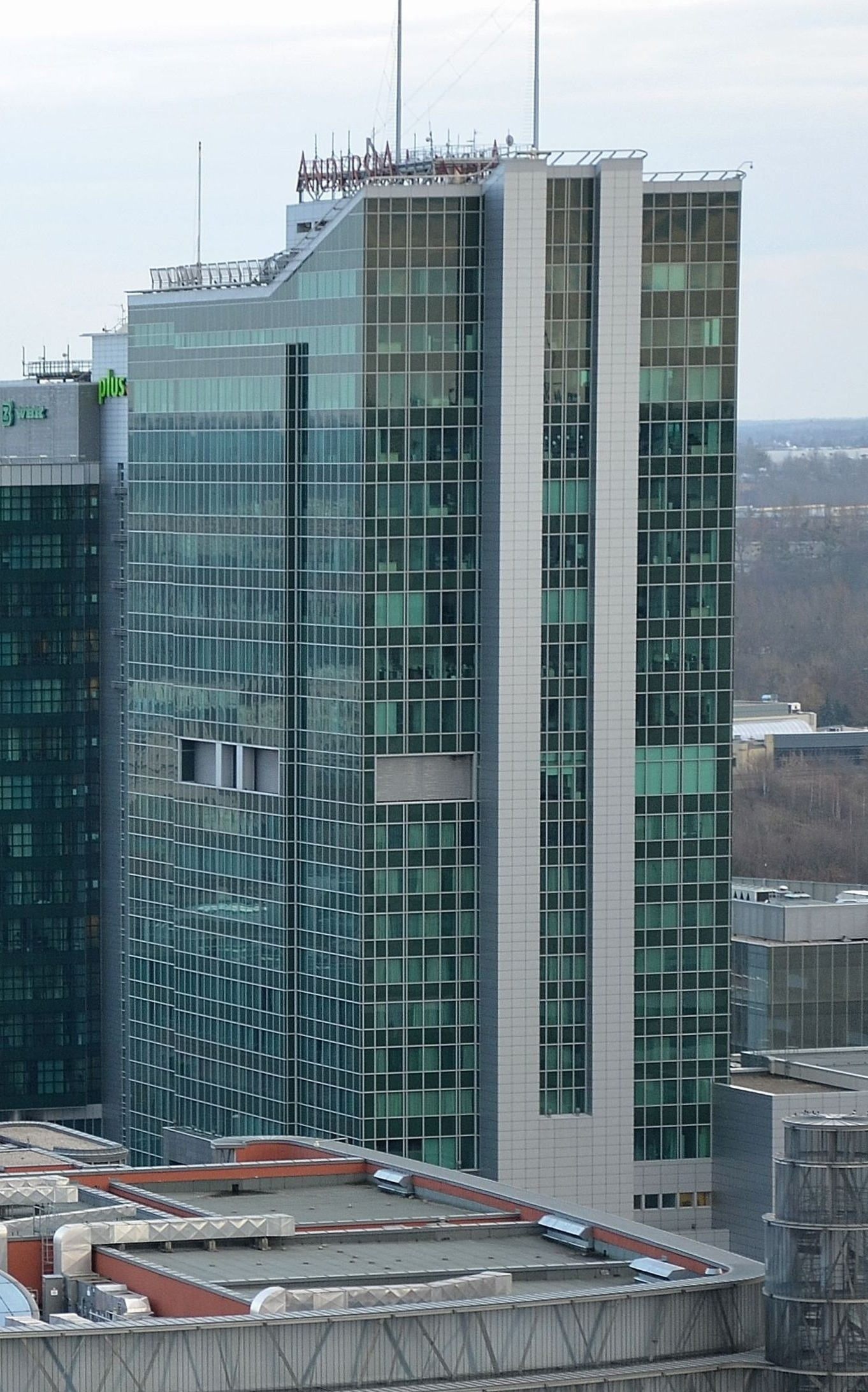
- Andersia Tower (left) and Poznań Financial Centre (right)
- Interactive map of the Andersia Tower area

General information
- Status: Completed
- Location: 3 Andersa Square, Stare Miasto, Poznań, Poland
- Coordinates: 52.401111°N 16.925833°E
- Construction started: 2004
- Completed: 2007
- Cost: $70,000,000

Height
- Architectural: 102.1 m (335 ft)
- Roof: 84 m (276 ft)

Technical details
- Floor count: 20 above ground 2 below ground
- Floor area: 42,476 m^{2} (457,210 sq ft)

Design and construction
- Architect: Sipinski
- Developer: Andersia

Other information
- Parking: 555 spaces

The Andersia Tower is a mixed-use building in the Stare Miasto area of Poznań, Poland. Completed in 2007, it stands at 102.1 m (335 ft) tall. It is the tallest building in Poznań.

== Gallery ==
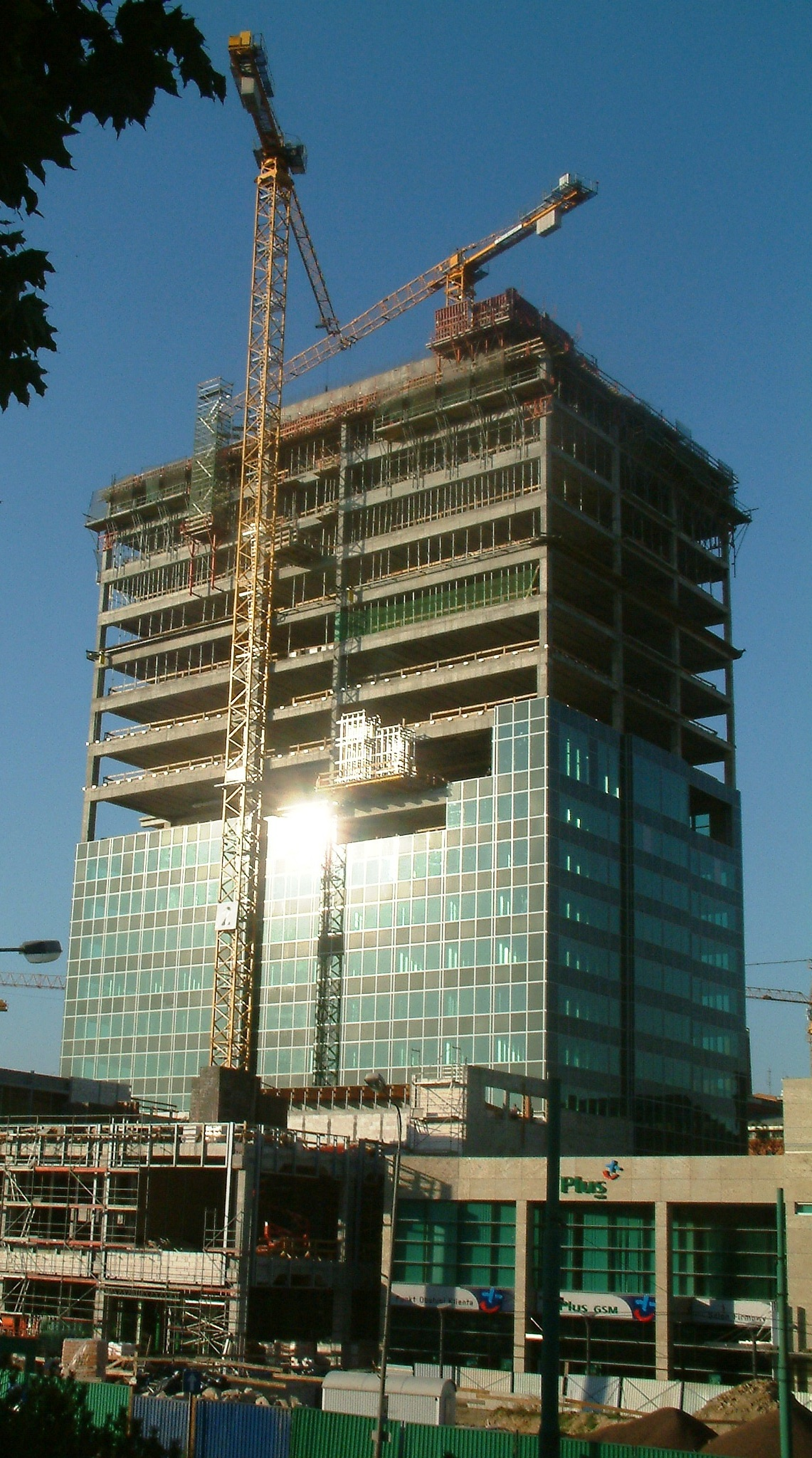
Under construction, on September 25, 2006.

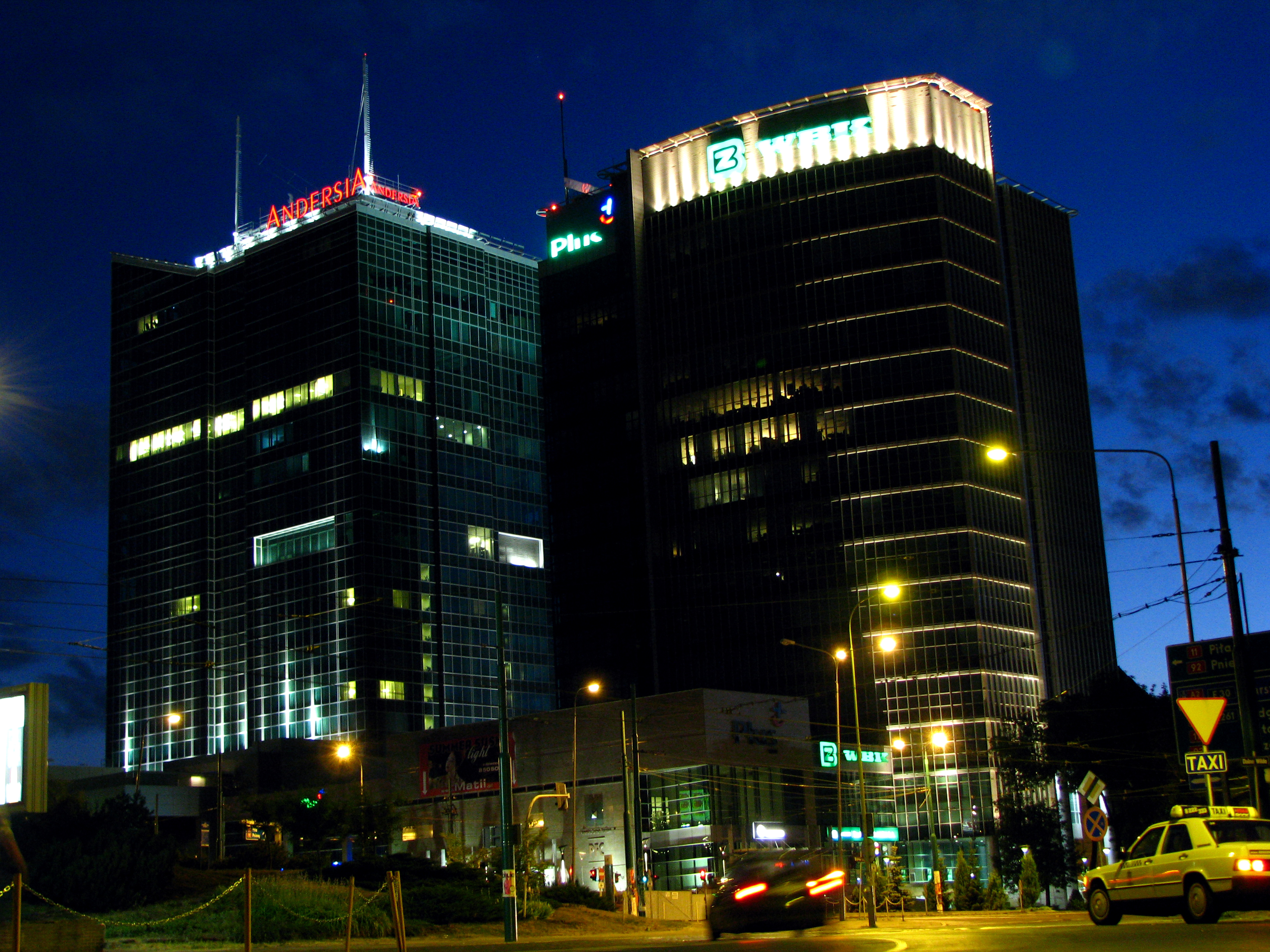
Andersia Tower (left) and Poznań Financial Centre (right) at night.
