= Poznań Financial Centre =

Building in Poznań, Poland

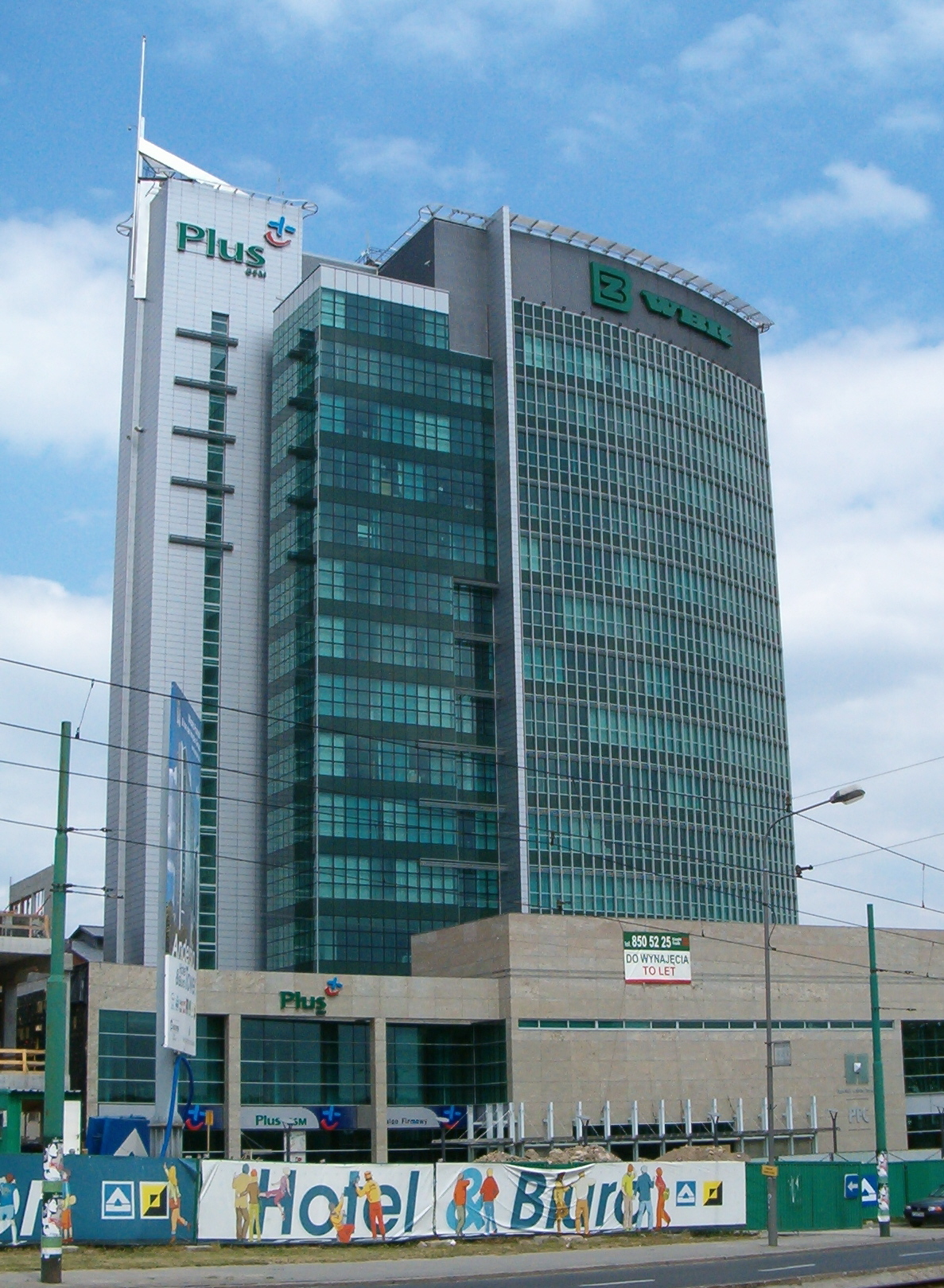
- Interactive map of the Poznań Financial Centre area

General information
- Status: Completed
- Location: 5 Andersa Square, Stare Miasto, Poznań, Poland
- Coordinates: 52.400757°N 16.926960°E
- Construction started: 1998
- Completed: 2001

Height
- Architectural: 91.1 m (299 ft)
- Roof: 75 m (246 ft)

Technical details
- Floor count: 18 above ground 2 below ground

Design and construction
- Architect: Sipinski

Other information
- Parking: 172 spaces

The Poznań Financial Centre is an office building in the Stare Miasto area of Poznań, Poland. Completed in 2001, it stands at 91.1 m (299 ft) tall. It is the second tallest building in Poznań.

== Gallery ==
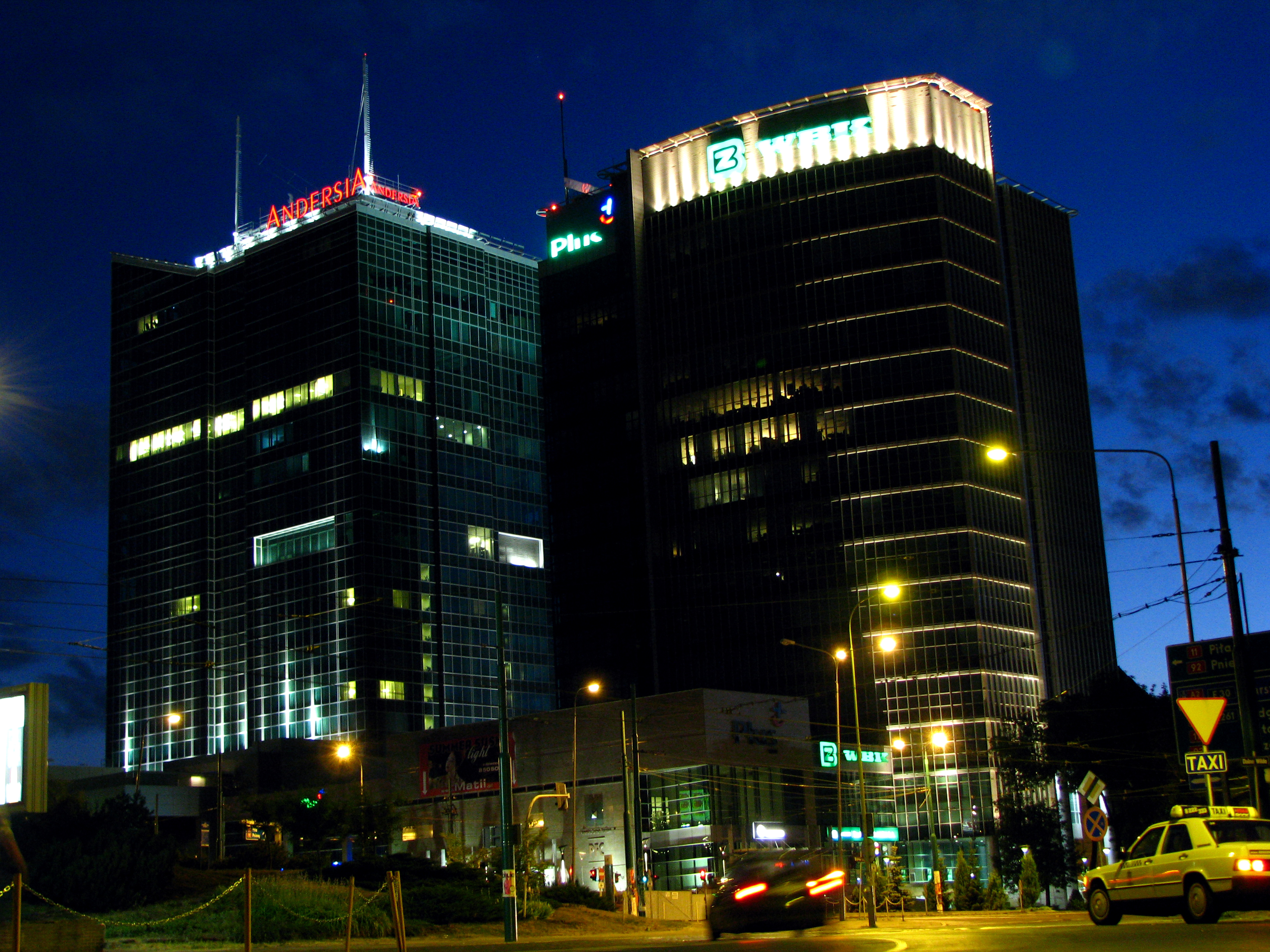
Andersia Tower (left) and Poznań Financial Centre (right) at night.

== See also ==
- Bank BZ-WBK
