= List of tallest buildings in Poznań =

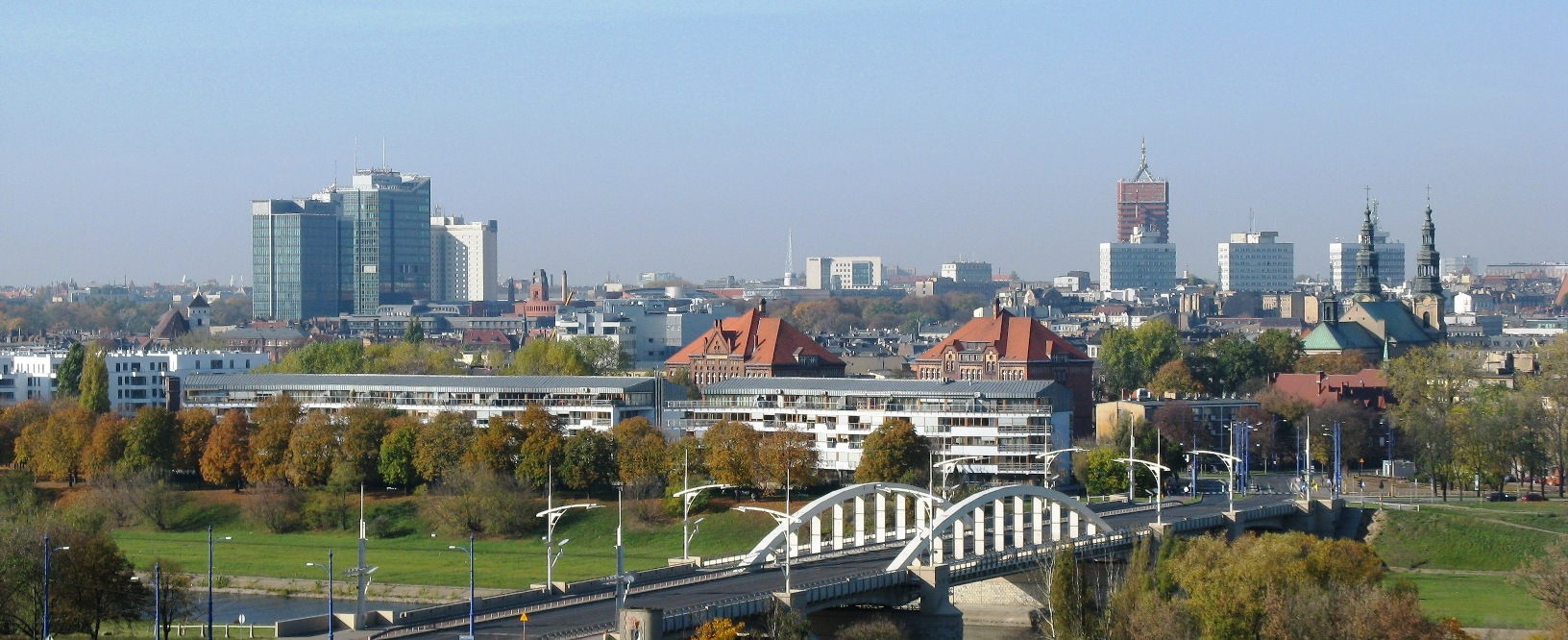
Skyline of Poznań in 2008

Poznań has 10 completed high-rise buildings that stand at least 60 metres (197 ft) tall. This includes 1 building standing at least 100 metres (328 ft) tall that can be defined as a skyscraper. The city is one of a few in Poland to have at least one of them in their city skyline.

The first high-rise building to be constructed and opened in the city is wieżowiec Miastoprojektu (English: Miastoprojekt skyscraper) in 1951. It was built as part of a push towards rebuilding and modernising the city center after World War II.

== Tallest buildings ==
This list ranks buildings in Poznań that stand at least 60 metres (197 ft) tall.

Was the tallest building in Poznań upon completion

| Rank | Name | Image | Height | Floors | Year | Primary use | Location | Notes |
|---|---|---|---|---|---|---|---|---|
| 1 | Andersia Tower | | 102.1 m (335 ft) | 20 | 2007 | Mixed | 3 Andersa Square | Tallest building in Poznań since 2007. |
| 2 | Poznań Financial Centre | | 91.1 m (299 ft) | 18 | 2001 | Office | 5 Andersa Square | Tallest building in Poznań until the construction of the Andersia Tower. |
| 3 | Collegium Altum | | 80.5 m (264 ft) | 22 | 1991 | Office | 16 Powstańców Wielkopolskich Street | Tallest building in Poznań until the construction of the Poznań Financial Centre; it houses the Poznań University of Economics and Business. |
| 4 | Towarowa 39 | | 73 m (240 ft) | 22 | 2020 | Residential | 39 Towarowa Street | Tallest residential building in Poznań. |
| 5 | Novotel Poznań Centrum | | 68 m (223 ft) | 18 | 1978 | Hotel | 1 Andersa Square | Tallest building in Poznań until the construction of Collegium Altum. |
| 6 | Bałtyk | | 67 m (220 ft) | 17 | 2017 | Office | 22 Roosevelta Street | |
| 7 | Nowy Rynek E | | 66 m (217 ft) | 15 | 2023 | Office | Matyi Street | |
| 8 | Chartowo Tower | | 61 m (200 ft) | 19 | 2005 | Residential | 29 Chartowo Street | |
| 8 | Delta 3 | | 61 m (200 ft) | 17 | 2017 | Residential | 37 Towarowa Street | |
| 10 | Atal Warta Towers | | 60 m (197 ft) | 18 | 2022 | Residential | 166 Rataje Street | |

== Under construction ==
This list ranks buildings under construction in Poznań that plan to stand at least 60 metres (197 ft) tall.

Indicates buildings that have been topped out

| Name | Image | Height | Floors | Construction started | Planned completion | Primary use | Location | Notes |
|---|---|---|---|---|---|---|---|---|
| AND2 | | 116 m (381 ft) | 25 | 2020 | 2025 | Office | 7 Andersa Square | The building will become the tallest in Poznań upon completion. |
| Industrial | | 60 m (197 ft) | 15 | 2023 | 2025 | Office | Komedy Street | |

== See also ==
- List of tallest buildings in Poland
